= Campau family =

Settler family of Detroit

- Current region: Michigan, U.S. Ontario, Canada; Quebec, Canada
- Origin: Campeaux, Calvados, Normandy, France
- Connected families: Beaubien family (French); Dequindre family (French); Cicott family (French); Palms family Moran family Throop family Woolsey family
- Motto: Escaillon Denaing

The Campau family is one of the original settler families of Detroit, descended from the nobility of Campeaux in the Normandy region. Its influential and well-connected members were among the largest landowners and founding figures of Michigan, forming the state's historic upper class. They were often referred to as the first generation of the "barons of Detroit," foreshadowing the "auto barons" of the industrial era in the early 20th century. The surname is sometimes spelled "Campeau."

The family controlled a vast and lucrative fur trading network in Michigan in the early 1800s. Numerous cities in Michigan grew out of trading posts established by Campau family members, including Manlius (Louis Campau, 1825), Lowell (Antoine Campau, 1831), Maple Rapids (George Campau, 1825), Saginaw (Louis Campau, Jr., 1816), and Grand Rapids (Louis Campau, Jr., 1826), among others.

One of the family's most notable pieces of real estate was Belle Isle, purchased by Barnabas Campau (1775–1845) in 1817. The island was sold to the city of Detroit in 1879.

== History ==
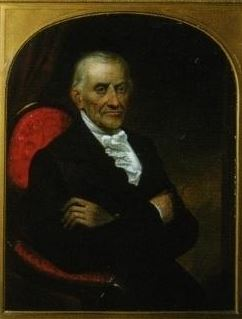
Joseph Campau (1769–1863), Michigan's first millionaire

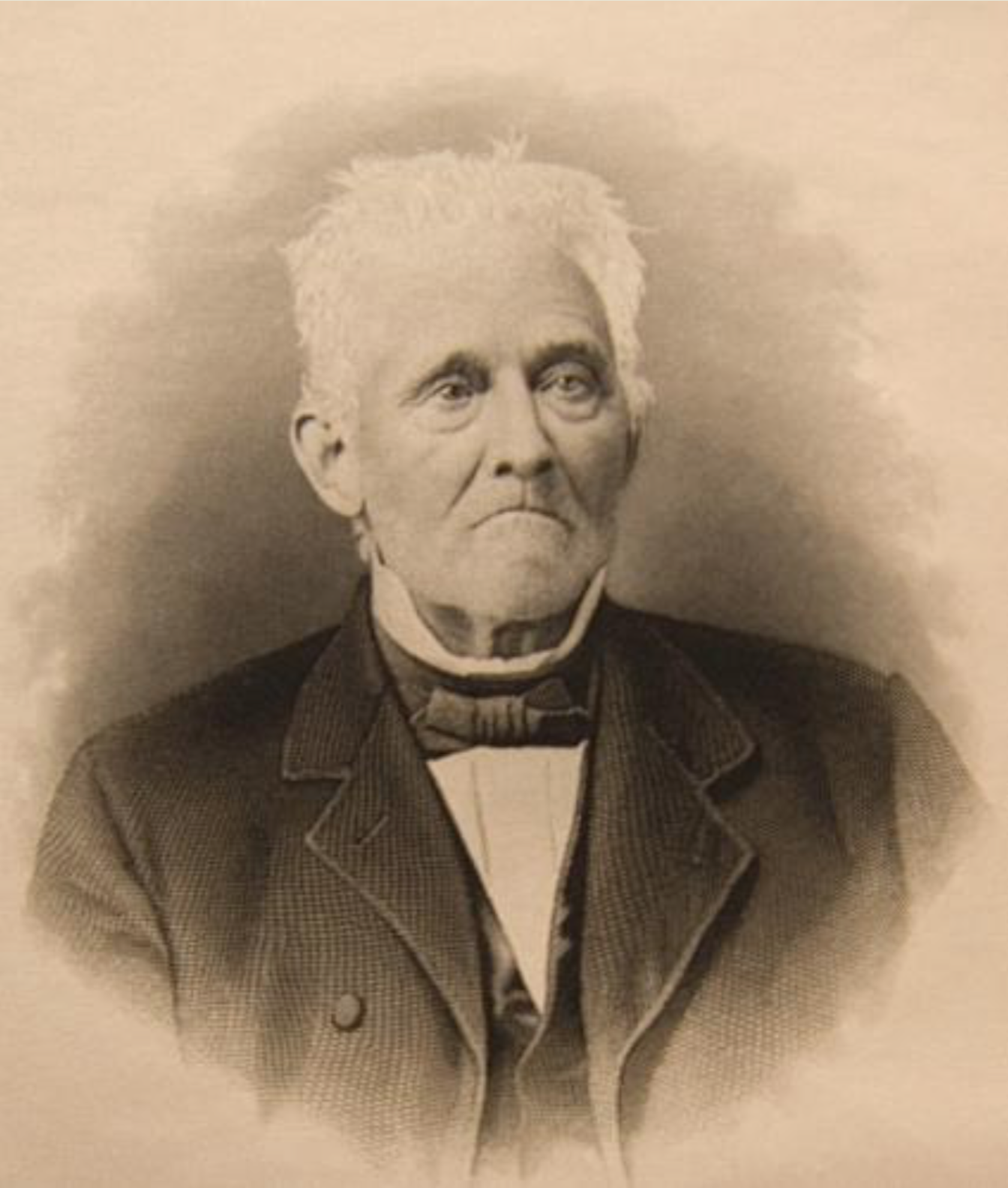
Louis Campau, Jr., founder of Saginaw and Grand Rapids

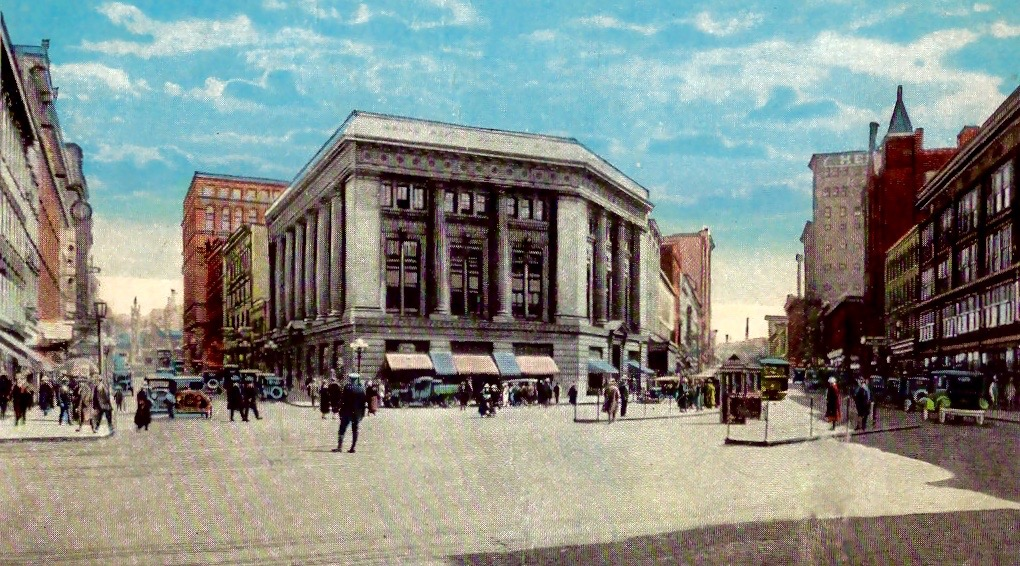
Campau Square, Grand Rapids, Michigan

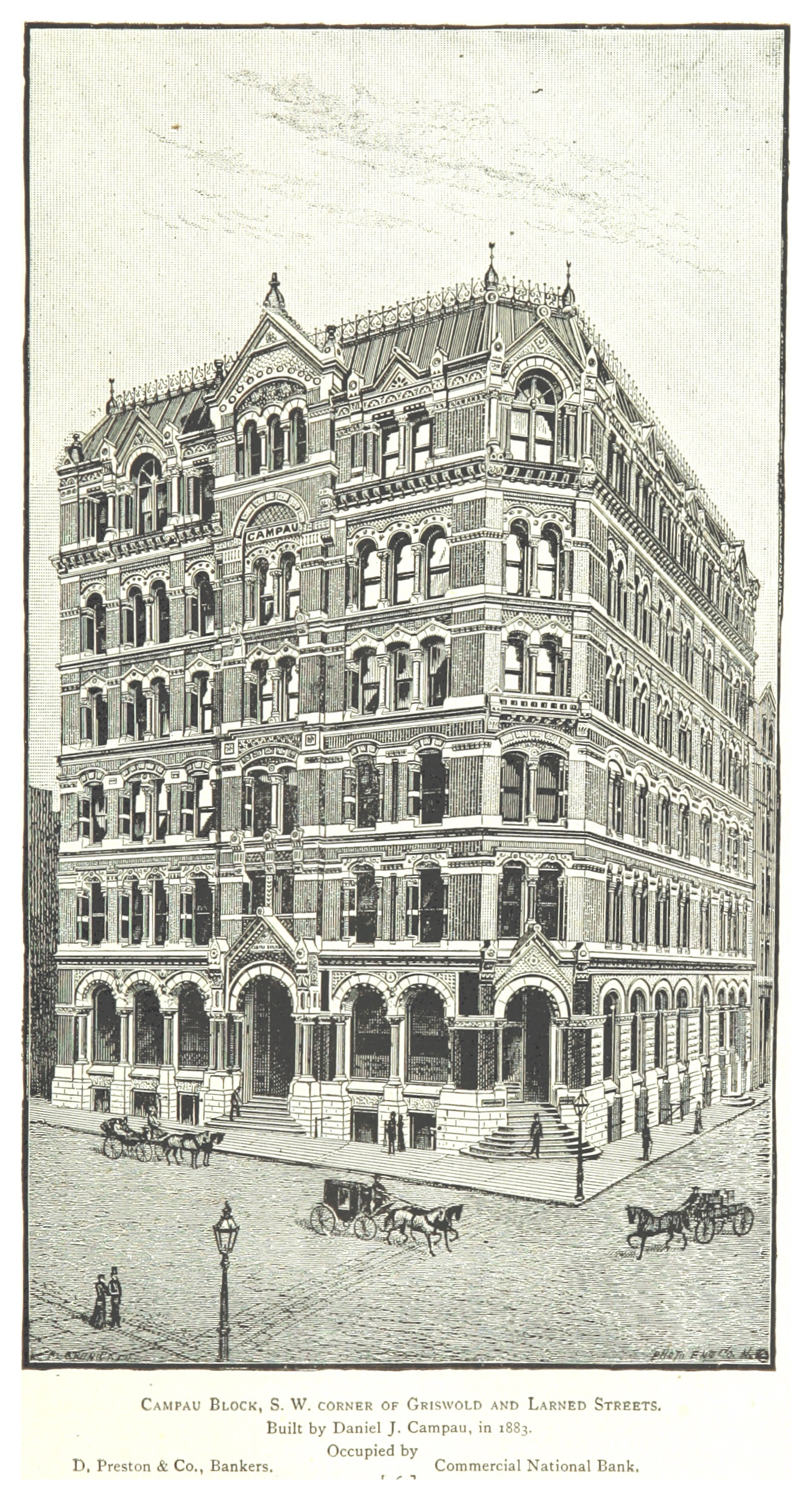
The Campau Block building in Detroit, built in 1883

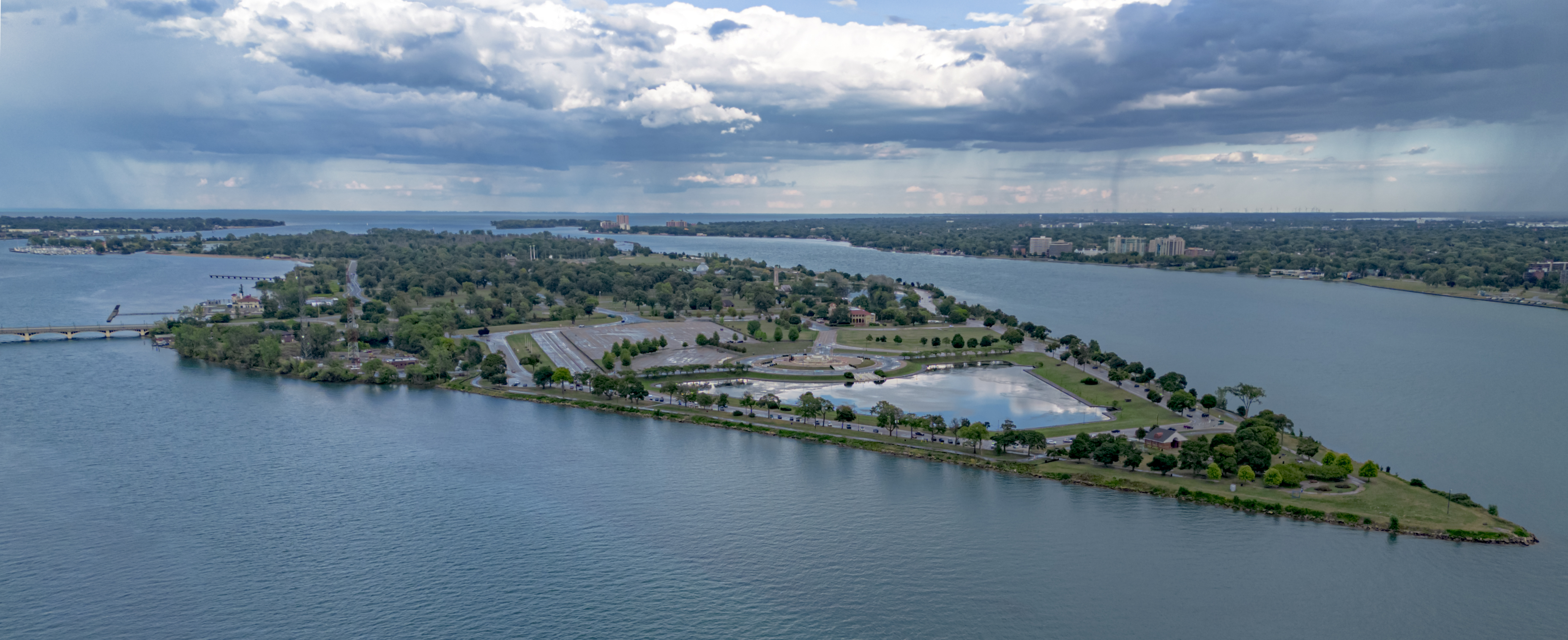
Belle Isle was a Campau family estate before being sold to the city of Detroit in 1879

French brothers Michel and Jacques Campau settled in Detroit in 1707 and 1708, respectively. Joseph; Louis Sr.; Louis Jr.; and Barnabas Campau were fur traders, first selling their furs in Canada and then New York. Joseph was a merchant in Detroit and several trading posts and the others operated a number of trading posts in "Indian country". They were also involved in treaties between the Native Americans and the federal government, which were very lucrative endeavors. Joseph made millions as real estate promoter and was a civil servant for Detroit. Other family members established trading posts in places that came to be known as Manlius (1825), Eaton Rapids, Muskegon, Manistee, Lowell, and Hastings. George established a trading post at Maple Rapids. Louis Campau Jr. established trading posts at Saginaw (1816) and Grand Rapids (1826).

Antoine de la Mothe Cadillac founded Fort Pontchartrain du Détroit in 1701 and sold 68 land grants between 1707 and 1710, two of which were sold to the Campau brothers. Michel Campau left Montreal and settled at Fort Pontchartrain du Détroit on August 3, 1707. He lived at the settlement with his wife, Jeanne Masse, and worked as a farmer. The couple had daughters named Jeanne and Marguerite (b. 1708) and a son, Paul Alexander (b. 1709). Michel died before 1740.

On September 3, 1708, Jacques Campau (1677–1751) settled in Detroit. He was a blacksmith. Jacques and his wife Cecile Catlin had a son, Louis (1702–1744). Jacques was buried on May 14, 1751. Many of their descendants are buried at Elmwood Cemetery in Detroit.

The brothers parents were Etienne Campau and Catherine Paulo of Montreal. Their descendants were located by the 20th century in three cities: Detroit, Grand Rapids, and Chicago.

Jacques' great-grandson, Joseph Campau (1769–1863) was among Detroit's leading citizens and wealthiest landowners at the dawn of the 19th century. Joseph was the state's first millionaire. He made millions in the real-estate industry and served in several public offices for the city. Campau held multiple public office positions in Detroit. He was City Trustee in 1802, City Treasurer, City Inspector of water barrels and City Assessor, appraiser, and over-seer of the poor. In 1802, he was an original trustee of Detroit and its incorporation. His daughter Catherine married Francis Palms, the largest landowner in Michigan during the mid-1850s.

Jacques' great-granddaughter and Joseph's sister, Marie-Cecile (Cecile) Campeau, was married to Thomas Williams by Arent DePeyster, commandant of Fort Detroit on May 7, 1781. It was one of Detroit's early Protestant marriages. Her father was Jacques Chapeau and her brothers were Barnabas, Denis, Joseph, Louis, Nicolas and Toussaint Chapeau. Williams was a trader and licensed merchant, justice of the peace, and notary. Cecile and Thomas had three children: Catherine, Elizabeth, and John Elizabeth taught in a Catholic school that she co-founded under the auspices of Gabriel Richard, a Detroit priest. John R. Williams was the first mayor of Detroit. The Williams family remained in Detroit from that time.

Thomas Williams died on November 30, 1785, and in July 1790, Cecile married Jaques Leson (also spelled Loson Lozen and Lauson) and they lived in what is now St. Clair County, Michigan. They had a daughter, Angelique. Cecile died on June 24, 1805, and was buried in the St. Anne's church cemetery.

Pierre Michel Campau was the first settler in Southgate, Michigan. He moved into the area in 1795, which subsequently became a farming community. Other people from the Detroit area at the Rouge and Detroit Rivers followed him to Southgate.

Louis Campau (1791–1871), sometimes spelled Campeau, was son of Louis Campau Sr. He began working the fur trade as a boy for his father and his uncle, Joseph Campau. During the War of 1812, he served under the United States Army. Campau was an important figure in the early settlement of two important Michigan cities. He established the first trading post at what is today Saginaw, Michigan, as early as 1815. He played a key role in negotiating the Treaty of Saginaw in 1819 between Gen. Lewis Cass and Native American tribes of the Great Lakes region in which Native Americans ceded more than six million acres (24,000 km²) in the central portion of the Lower Peninsula of the state. In 1826, Campau moved westward and established a trading post in what is today Grand Rapids. In 1831, he bought land for what is now the downtown business district of that city from the federal government for $90. Along with fellow pioneer Lucius Lyon, Campau is remembered as one of the founding fathers of Grand Rapids.

Antoine Campau (1797–1874) like his brother Louis, was a fur trader. Between 1815 and 1816, he was at the Saginaw trading post. According to James M. McClurken, Antoine has been believed to be the father of Odawa chief Cobmoosa, who first lived near Grand Rapids, Michigan. (But this Antoine Campau was born in 1797, 39 years too late to be the father of Chief Cobmoosa.) Cobmoosa led the Ojibwe, of a band of the Ottawa people, in Ionia, Michigan, and sold their crops to the initial settlers of Ionia in 1833. He was also among those who went with Rix Robinson to negotiate a treaty for removal to Indian Territory, but he like other Ojibwe resisted that removal. In 1855 he signed a treaty with the federal government to relocate to Oceana County, Michigan, in exchange for $540,000 in cash and goods. The government built a log cabin for him in Cobmoosa, Michigan, and he along with 1300 others relocated by 1858.

== Family namesake places ==
- Joseph Campau Street, Joseph Campau Historic District, Hamtramck, Michigan
- Campau Block building (1883–1930), Griswold Street, Detroit, Michigan
- North Campau neighborhood, Detroit, Michigan
- Campau/Banglatown neighborhood, Detroit, Michigan
- Campau Lake, Kent County, Michigan
- Louis Campau Promenade, Grand Rapids, Michigan
- Campau Circle NW, Grand Rapids, Michigan
- Campau Avenue NW, Grand Rapids, Michigan

== Members ==
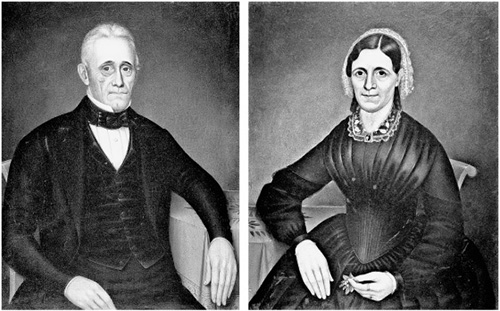
Portraits of Louis Campau (1791–1871) and Sophie de Marsac Campau (1807–1869), (1852), by Charles H. Moore

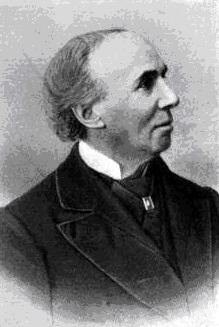
Francis Palms (1809–1886), son-in-law of Joseph Campau (1769–1863); the largest landholder in Michigan during the mid-1850s

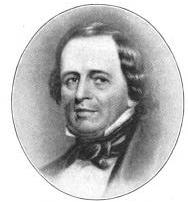
John R. Williams (1782–1854), son of Cecile Campeau and Thomas Williams. He was the first mayor of Detroit under the second charter

- Leonard Campau (1610–1663), married Francoise Mauge, both natives and residents of Picardie, France
  - Etienne Campau (1638–1692), immigrated to New France; married Catherine Paulo, a Filles du Roy, King's Daughters
    - Michel Campau (1667–1737), married Jeanne Masse
    - Jacques Campau (1677–1751), secretary to Antoine de la Mothe Cadillac
      - Jean Louis Campau (1702–1774), married Marie Louise Robert
        - Louis Campau (1731–?)
        - Jacques Campau (1735–1789), married Catherine Menard; treasurer of St. Anne's Catholic Church
          - Marie Cecile Campau (1764–1805), married Thomas Williams; son John R. Williams (1782–1854), the first mayor of Detroit under the second charter. Later married Jacques Lauzon.
          - Jacques (James) Campau (1766–1838), married Susanne Cuillerier, dit Beaubien
          - Louis Campau, Sr. (1767–1834), married Therese Moran
            - Louis Campau, Jr. (1791–1871), married Sophie de Marsac Campau (1807–1869); founder of Saginaw and Grand Rapids
            - Antoine Campau (1797–1874), believed to be the father of Odawa chief Cobmoosa, founder of Lowell
          - Joseph Campau (1769–1863), married Adelaide Dequindre (1808–1863), sister of Antoine Dequindre; largest landowner in early Detroit; benefactor of the University of Michigan
            - Catherine Dequindre Campau (1816–1880), married Francis Palms, the largest landowner in Michigan during the mid-1850s
          - Tonssaint Campau (1771–1810)
          - Nicolas Amable Campau (1773–1811)
          - Barnabas Campau (1775–1845), married Therese Cicot (1780–1817) and later Archange McDougall; purchased Belle Isle from Alexander Macomb, Jr.
            - Angelique Campau (1809–1872), married John B. Piquette (1809–1851)
            - Emilie Campau (1811–1881)
            - John Barnabas Campau (1822–1859), married Alexandrine M. Sheldon
            - Alexander Macomb Campau (1823–1908), married Eliza S. Throop (1828–1905), the daughter of George B. Throop; one of the first students in the University of Michigan
              - George Throop Campau (1847–1879), married Mary Livingston Woolsey, daughter of Melancthon Brooks Woolsey; captain of Detroit Boat Club; graduate and benefactor of the University of Michigan
          - Catherine Campau (1779–1834), married Louis Vessiere, dit Laferte
          - Denys Campau (1781–1818), married Felicite de Joneaire, dit Chabert
        - Simon Campau (1739–1803), married Veronique Bourdeau
        - Jean Baptiste Campau (1743–?), married Genevieve Godet, dit Marantette
      - Henry Campau (1704–?), married Marguerite L'Huillier
      - Nicolas Campau, dit Niagara (1710–1756), married Agatha Casse, dit St. Aubin
      - Jean Baptiste Campau (1711–1783), married Catherine Perthuis
      - Therese Cecile Campau (1714–1746), married Francois Marsac
      - Claude Campau (1715–1787), married Catherine Casse, dit St. Aubin
