= Palms Apartments =

- The Palms
- U.S. National Register of Historic Places
- Michigan State Historic Site
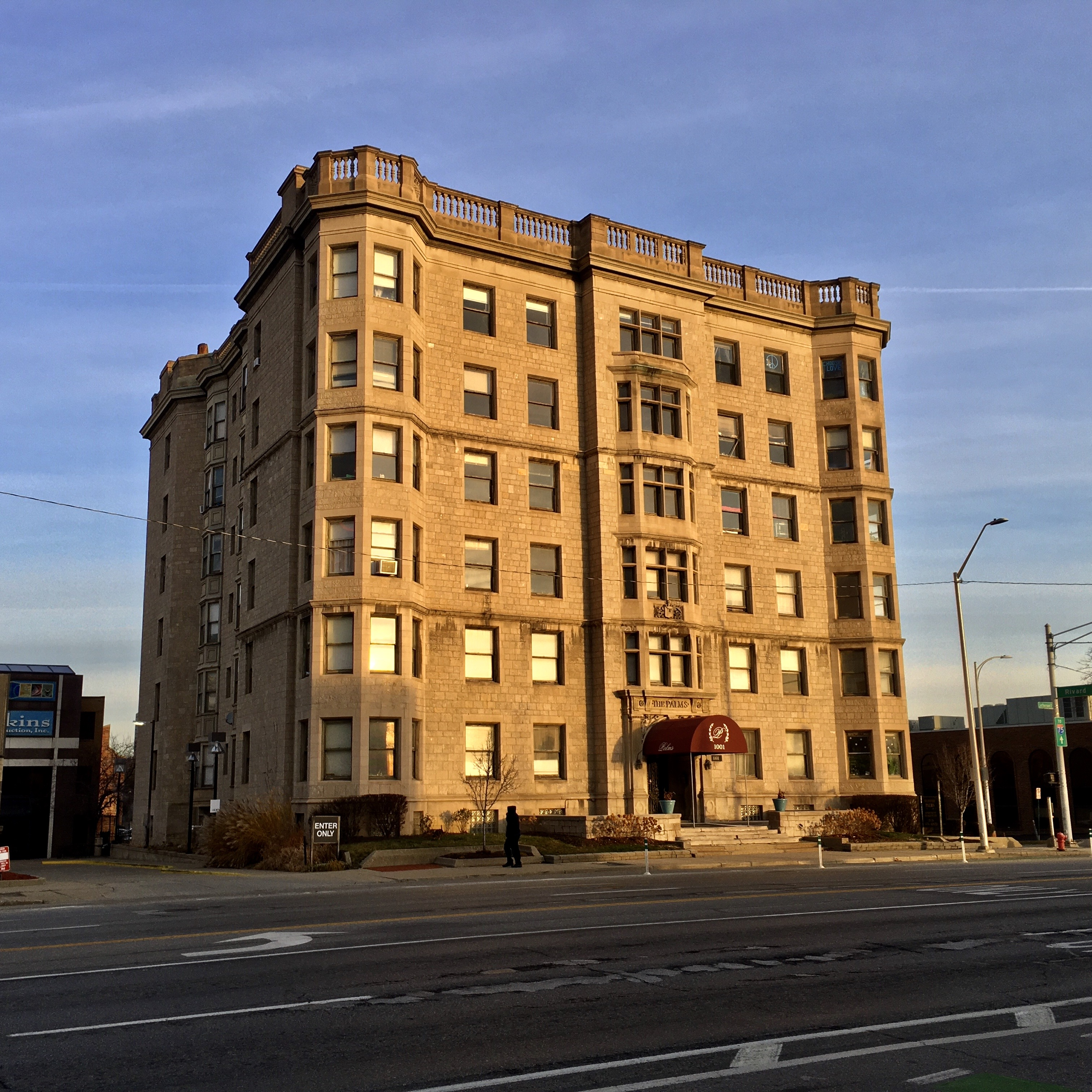
- The Palms Apartments, December 2020
- Interactive map
- Location: 1001 East Jefferson Avenue; Detroit, Michigan
- Coordinates: 42°20′0″N 83°2′4″W
- Built: 1903
- Architect: George D. Mason & Albert Kahn
- Architectural style: English Renaissance
- MPS: East Jefferson Avenue Residential TR
- NRHP reference No.: 85002942
- Added to NRHP: October 09, 1985

The Palms is an apartment building located at 1001 East Jefferson Avenue in Detroit, Michigan. It was one of the first buildings in the United States to use reinforced concrete as one of its major construction materials. It was listed on the National Register of Historic Places in 1985.

== Significance ==
The six-story apartment building was initially built as a high-class residence between 1901 and 1903 at a cost of about $80,000. However, the historical importance of this building lies in its construction. The building was designed by the architectural firm of George D. Mason and Albert Kahn Associates, who used reinforced concrete as one of the major construction materials—one of the first buildings in the nation constructed in such fashion. The technique of using reinforced concrete was not fully developed until Julius Kahn, brother of Albert, developed the "Kahn System" of reinforcing the concrete and formed the Trussed Concrete Steel Company in Detroit to produce the steel bar that was developed for this system. In 1905, Building No. 10 of the Packard Plant was built using the new Kahn System.

== Description ==
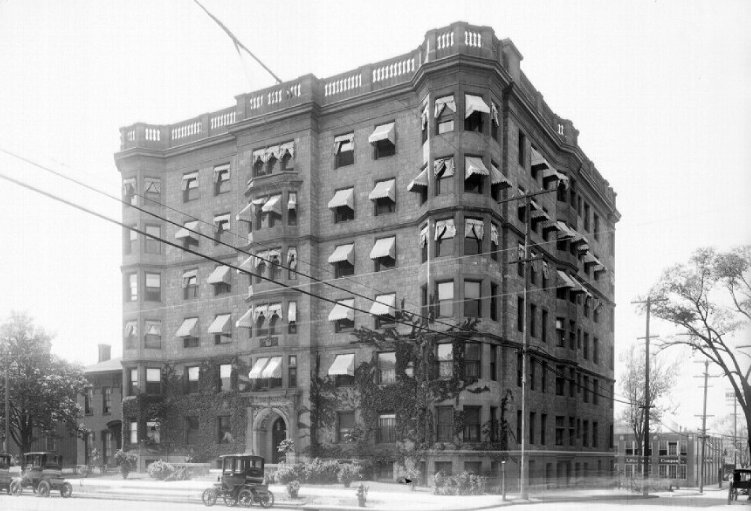
Palms Apartments, c. 1902

The Palms and Book families were the investors in the construction of this building; it was named after Francis Palms, who lived in the nearby Croul-Palms House. The building is constructed in a "U" shape, with an exterior of solid masonry faced in limestone. The façade is symmetrical, with octagonal towers at the corners. The original floor plans called for apartments that occupied an entire wing of the building, consisting of a double parlor in the front and a dining room with fireplace to the back separated by bedrooms, libraries, baths and more. However, in the 1930s the building was divided into smaller apartments. Much of the original details still exist on the interior and exterior. The building was listed on the State Register in 1979, the National Register in 1985, and received Local Historic District designation in 1980.

== Sources ==
- "Palms Apartments," City of Detroit Planning and Development Department, 1980
