= Graham House (Lowell, Michigan) =

- U.S. National Register of Historic Places
- U.S. Historic district – Contributing property
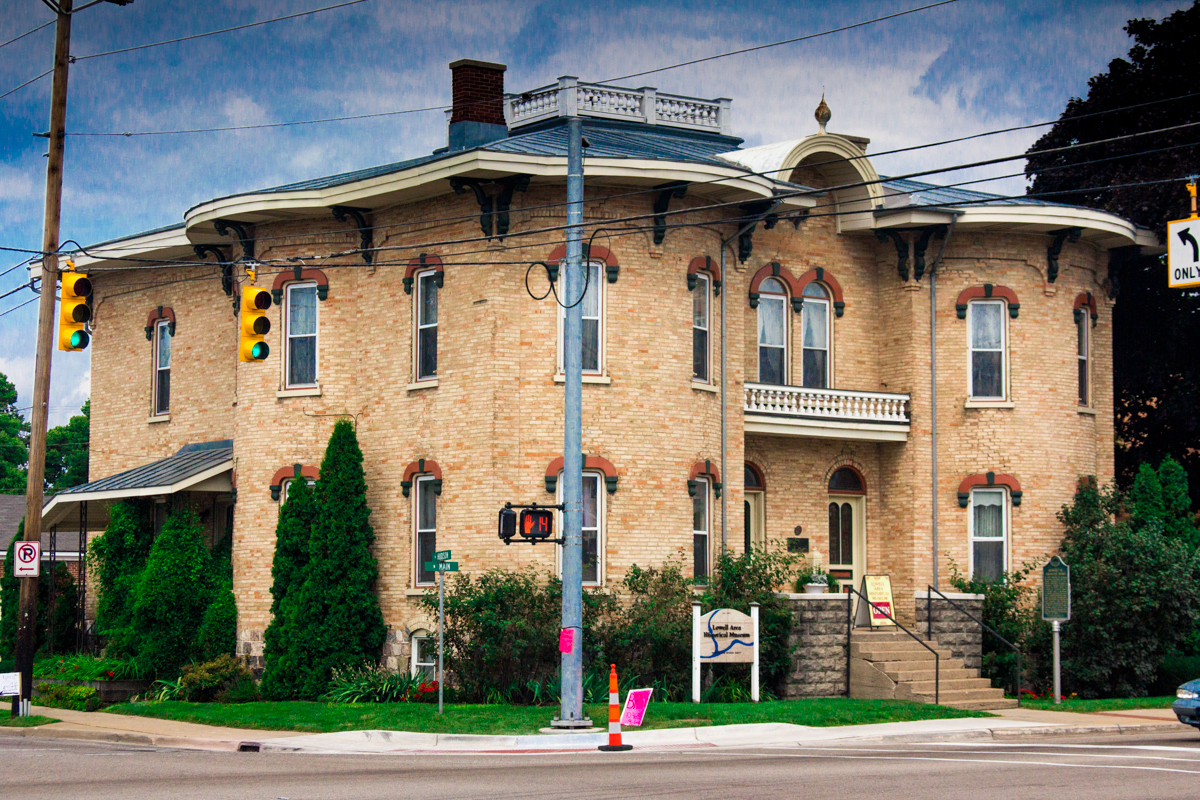
- Interactive map
- Location: 325 Main St., Lowell, Michigan
- Coordinates: 42°56′02″N 85°20′30″W
- Area: 1 acre (0.40 ha)
- Built: 1873
- Architectural style: Italianate
- Part of: Downtown Lowell Historic District (ID99001539)
- NRHP reference No.: 72000626
- Added to NRHP: January 13, 1972

The Graham House was built as a duplex home located at 325 Main Street in Lowell, Michigan. It was listed on the National Register of Historic Places in 1972. The building now houses the Lowell Area Historical Museum.

== History ==
Robert W. Graham emigrated from Great Britain and purchased a farm near Lowell in 1854. He both farmed and worked as a mason in Lowell and nearby Grand Rapids. In 1863, Graham married Emma Post, and in the early 1870s the couple and their family moved into Lowell. In 1873, Graham constructed this duplex home, with one half housing his family and the other half housing Emma's parents, Joseph and Julia Post.

One of the Graham's children was Ernest R. Graham, who went on to become a nationally recognized architect, working in Chicago. In 1899, Ernest Graham inherited the Lowell home, and rented it out as apartments. In 1922, he invited the Lowell library, then without a building, to use one half of the first floor. The library remained in the building even after Ernest Graham's death in 1936. In 1954, the village of Lowell purchased the house from the Graham heirs, to use as a home for the library. In 1997, the library moved to a new location, and by 2001 the Lowell Area Historical Museum had opened in the house.

== Description ==
The Graham House is a two-story yellow brick Italianate structure on a stone foundation, built as a two-family dwelling. It has a bracketed roof with a wide overhang. The front facade is symmetrical, with each half of the duplex mirrored. The facade is divided into three sections: a flat center section with a projecting curved wing on each side. The center section contains a front porch on the first floor with a balcony above, both of which run the width of the section. The doors and windows of the center section are within rounded arches; the roofline above has a similar rounded section.
