= Charles Moran (American politician) =

American politician (1797–1876)

Member of the Michigan House of Representatives from the Wayne County district
- In office July 11, 1836 – January 1, 1837
- Preceded by: Jonathan P. Fay (died in office)
- In office January 1, 1838 – January 6, 1839
- In office January 6, 1840 – January 3, 1841

Personal details
- Born: April 21, 1797 Detroit, Northwest Territory
- Died: October 13, 1876 (aged 79) Detroit, Michigan
- Party: Democratic

Charles Moran (April 21, 1797 – October 13, 1876) was an American businessman, jurist, and politician who served three terms in the Michigan House of Representatives. His family was prominent in early Detroit, and he is also related to the Campau and Dequindre families who were influential in the growth of the city.

== Early life and family ==
Moran was born April 21, 1797, to Charles Moran and Catherine Vessiere dit Laferté, in the family home on Woodbridge Street in Detroit. His younger brother, also named Charles, had died in infancy two years earlier, and his mother died that November. He was the grandson of Charles Claude Moran, an early settler in Detroit who himself was the grandson of Pedro da Silva dit Portugais, the first mail courier in Canada. Through Charles Claude's wife, Marie Ann Campau, daughter of Michel Campau, he was also related to Detroit's influential Campau family.

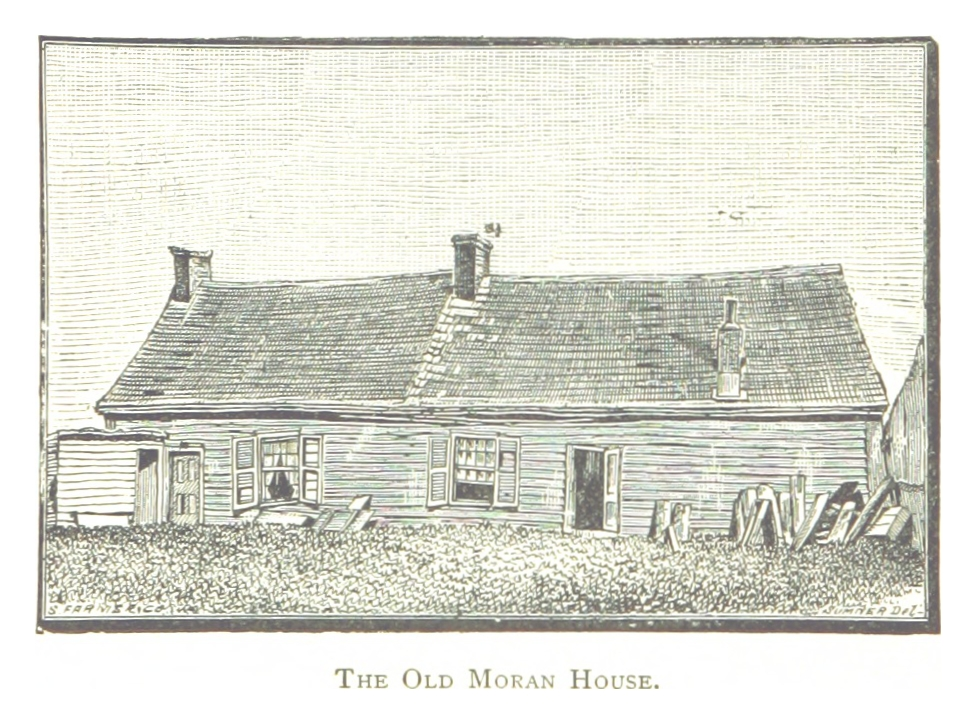
The house in Detroit where Charles Moran was born.

Charles Claude Moran was murdered by his brother-in-law, John Joseph Hacker, in 1775. Hacker's extra-legal execution, along with the executions of Ann Wyley and Jean Contencineau in 1777, led to citizen outrage over Justice Philippe DeJean and Lieutenant Governor Henry Hamilton's heavy-handed rule. The pair were indicted by a grand jury in Montreal, though they were soon captured by American forces and imprisoned by Thomas Jefferson in Williamsburg, Virginia, so did not face punishment by British authorities. The murder left Marie Ann Campau in charge of a significant land holding—a farm that in present-day Detroit would stretch along the Detroit River for several blocks between St. Antoine and Russell Streets, and extend about three miles back from the river.

Charles Moran fought in the War of 1812 after enlisting at the age of fifteen, and was serving under General William Hull when Hull surrendered Detroit to the British. As a member of the territorial militia rather than the regular army, Moran was paroled instead of being sent to Canada as a prisoner of war, and he continued to participate in the defense of Detroit, including joining a posse led by Governor Lewis Cass to pursue Native American marauders. He received a bounty of 160 acres (65 ha) for his service, but was unsuccessful in petitioning Congress for compensation for damage to his Detroit properties caused by the American forces.

== Career ==
Moran was a Democrat who served on the Michigan Territorial Council from 1832 to 1835, and was a delegate to the Second Convention of Assent in 1836 that accepted the deal offered by Congress, where Michigan would gain statehood by ceding the Toledo Strip to Ohio in exchange for the western portion of the Upper Peninsula. That same year, he was appointed to serve out the remaining term of state representative Jonathan P. Fay, who had died in office. He was elected to house himself for two terms, in 1838 and 1840.

He served as a county judge in 1831 and again from 1837 to 1841, and held various other positions including justice of the peace and alderman. He spent most of his later years managing the family estate, known as the Moran Farm. Rather than sell the farm off, he subdivided it into city blocks and leased them out, opening streets across it as he did so, including Hastings Street.

== Death and legacy ==
He died suddenly at home in Detroit on October 13, 1876, with the cause given as "heart disease superinduced by indigestion". He was the sole remaining heir to the family fortune, which at his death was estimated at $4 million (equivalent to $120,937,500 in 2025).

=== Family ===
Moran married Julia Dequindre, daughter of Antoine Dequindre, on August 21, 1822, and they had five children: Catherine Matilda, Charles Desrivieres, Julia Victoire, Marie Josephine, and Virginia Adeline. She died on January 16, 1835, and on August 3, 1836, Moran married Justine McCormick of Batavia, New York. They had six more children: Jane M., James M., William Benjamin, John Vallée, Catherine Elizabeth, and Alfred Toll.

John Vallée Moran became a prominent businessman in Detroit. William was a lawyer who also served as Detroit's city controller and park commissioner, and was a founder of the Peninsula Stove Company. Catherine married the son of Henry Barnard.
