= Admiral Scott =

Admiral Scott may refer to:

- Albert Charles Scott (1872–1969), was a British Royal Navy vice admiral
- Brent W. Scott (fl. 1970s–2020s), U.S. Navy rear admiral
- Lord Charles Montagu Douglas Scott (1839–1911), British Royal Navy admiral
- David Scott (Royal Navy officer) (1921–2006), British Royal Navy rear admiral
- Gustavus H. Scott (1812–1882), United States Navy rear admiral
- James Scott (Royal Navy officer) (1790–1872), British Royal Navy admiral
- John Addison Scott (1906–1986), U.S. Navy rear admiral
- Norman Scott (admiral) (1889–1942), U.S. Navy rear admiral
- Percy Scott (1853–1924), British Royal Navy admiral

== See also ==
- Alan Scott-Moncrieff (1900–1980), Royal Navy admiral
