= Louis Campau =

Early American settler

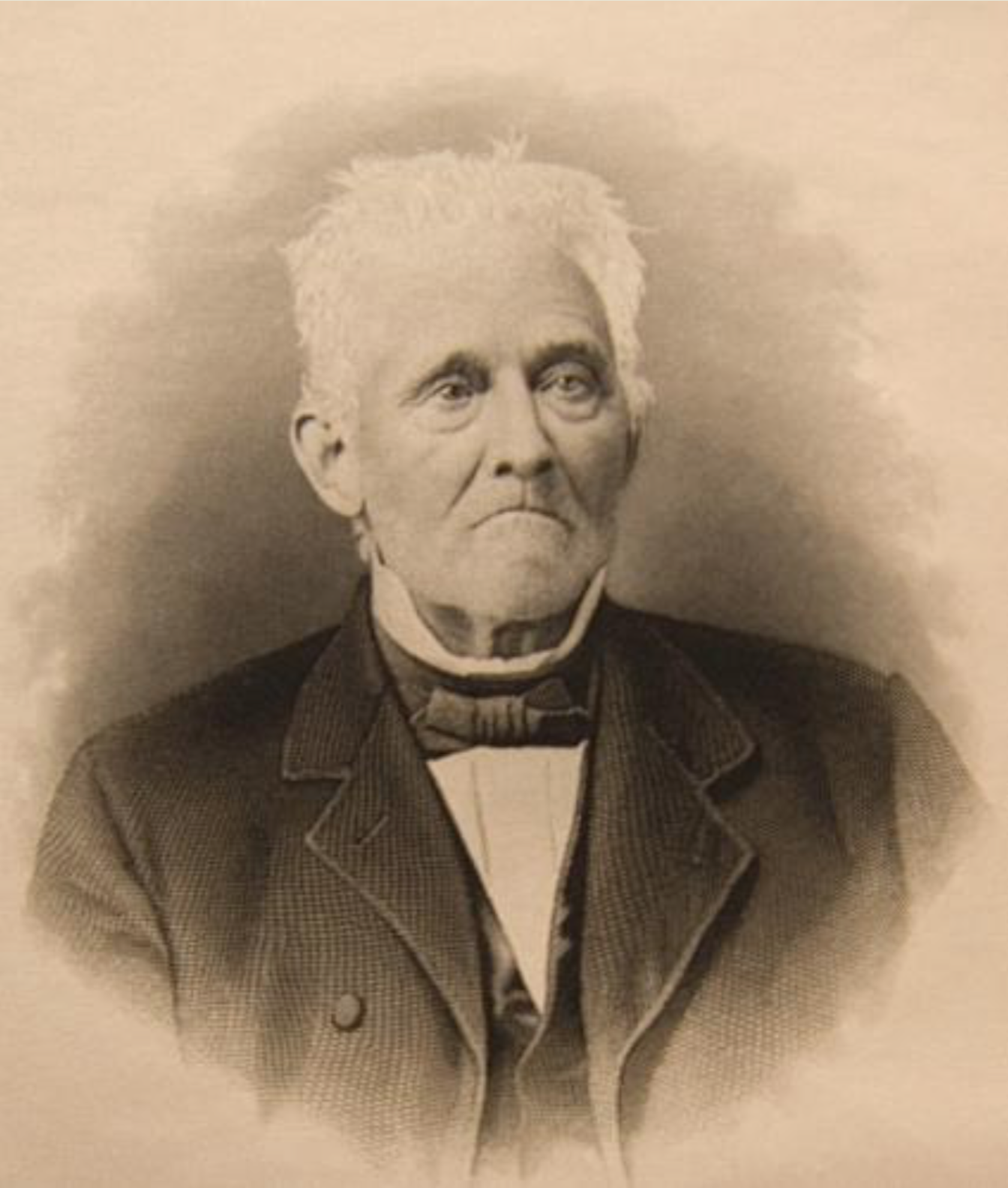
- Born: August 11, 1791; Detroit, Michigan
- Died: April 13, 1871; Grand Rapids, Michigan
- Spouse: Sophie Campau

Louis Campau (August 11, 1791 – April 13, 1871), also spelled Louis Campeau, was an important figure in the early settlement of Saginaw and Grand Rapids - two important Michigan cities in which he had established trading posts. Campau was also involved in negotiations between the local Native Americans and the federal government, including the Treaty of Detroit signed in 1855 by the local chief, Cobmoosa.

== Early years and personal life ==
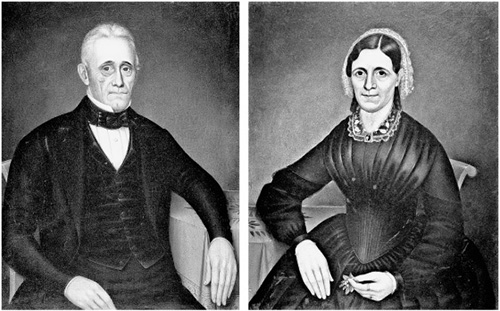
Charles H. Moore, Portraits of Louis Campau (1791-1871) and Sophie de Marsac Campau (1807-1869), 1852. The painting is in the Grand Rapids History & Special Collections of the Grand Rapids Public Library.

Campau was born in 1791 in Detroit, which at the time was functionally part of the Province of Quebec. He was a member of the prominent Campau family who were of French heritage. He began working the fur trade as a boy for his father, Louis Campau, Sr., and his uncle, Joseph Campau. During the War of 1812, he served under the United States Army.

His wife was Sophie Marsac, also born in Detroit. Sophie was the daughter of René Marsac, an early and notable family from New France. The Sophie de Marsac Campau Grand Rapids Chapter of the Daughters of the American Revolution was created in her memory and in so doing "perpetuated the name of a woman of rare grace and character who was held in high esteem by the early pioneers."

== Saginaw ==
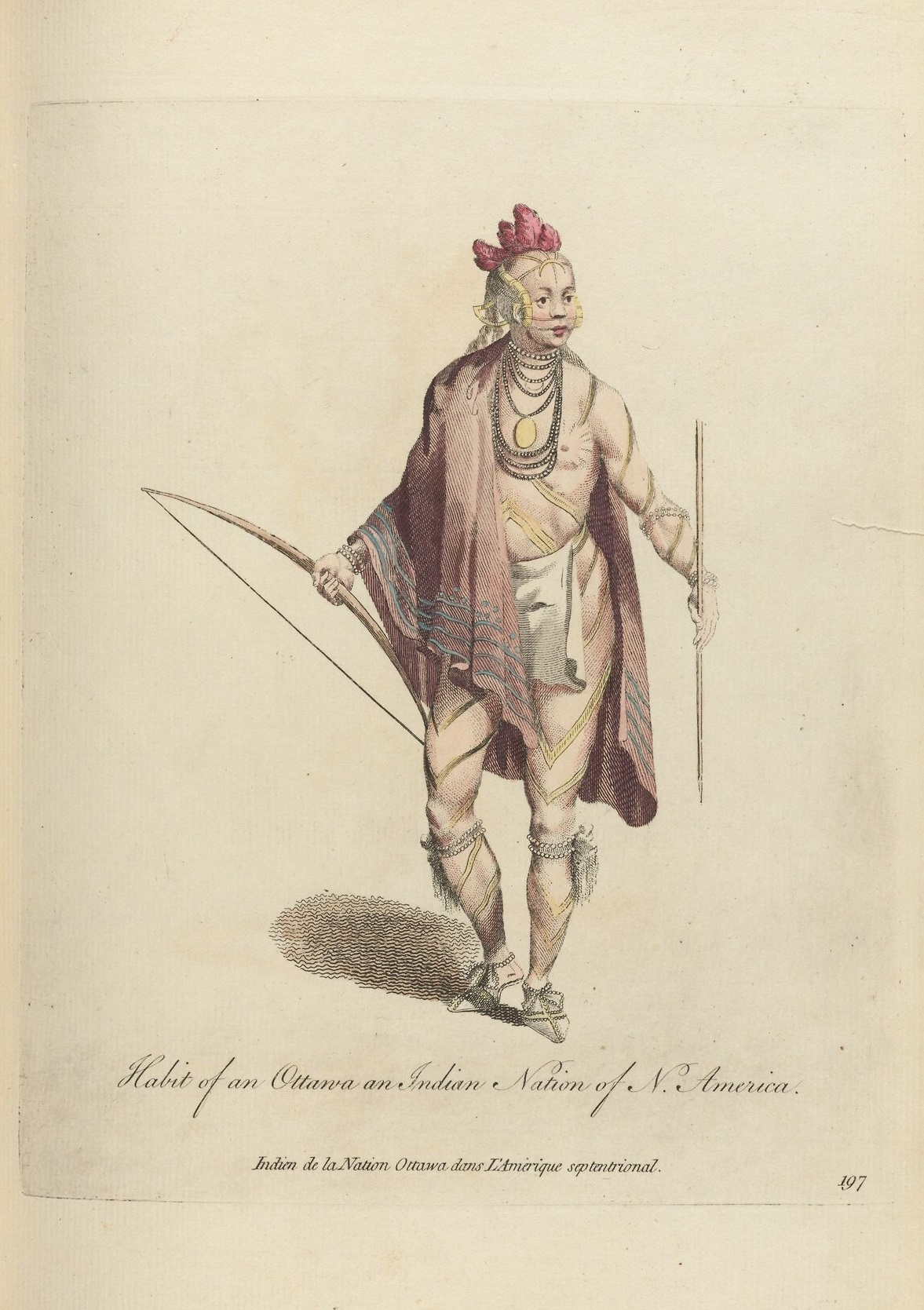
A 1772 engraving of a man from an Odawa (Ottawa) tribe.

He established the first trading post at what is today Saginaw, Michigan, as early as 1815. He played a key role in negotiating the Treaty of Saginaw in 1819. This Treaty was made between Gen. Lewis Cass and Native American tribes of the Great Lakes region (principally the Ojibwe, but also the Odawa (Ottawa) and Potawatomi) of Michigan. Native Americans ceded more than six million acres (24,000 km^{2}) in the central portion of the Lower Peninsula of Michigan.

== Grand Rapids ==
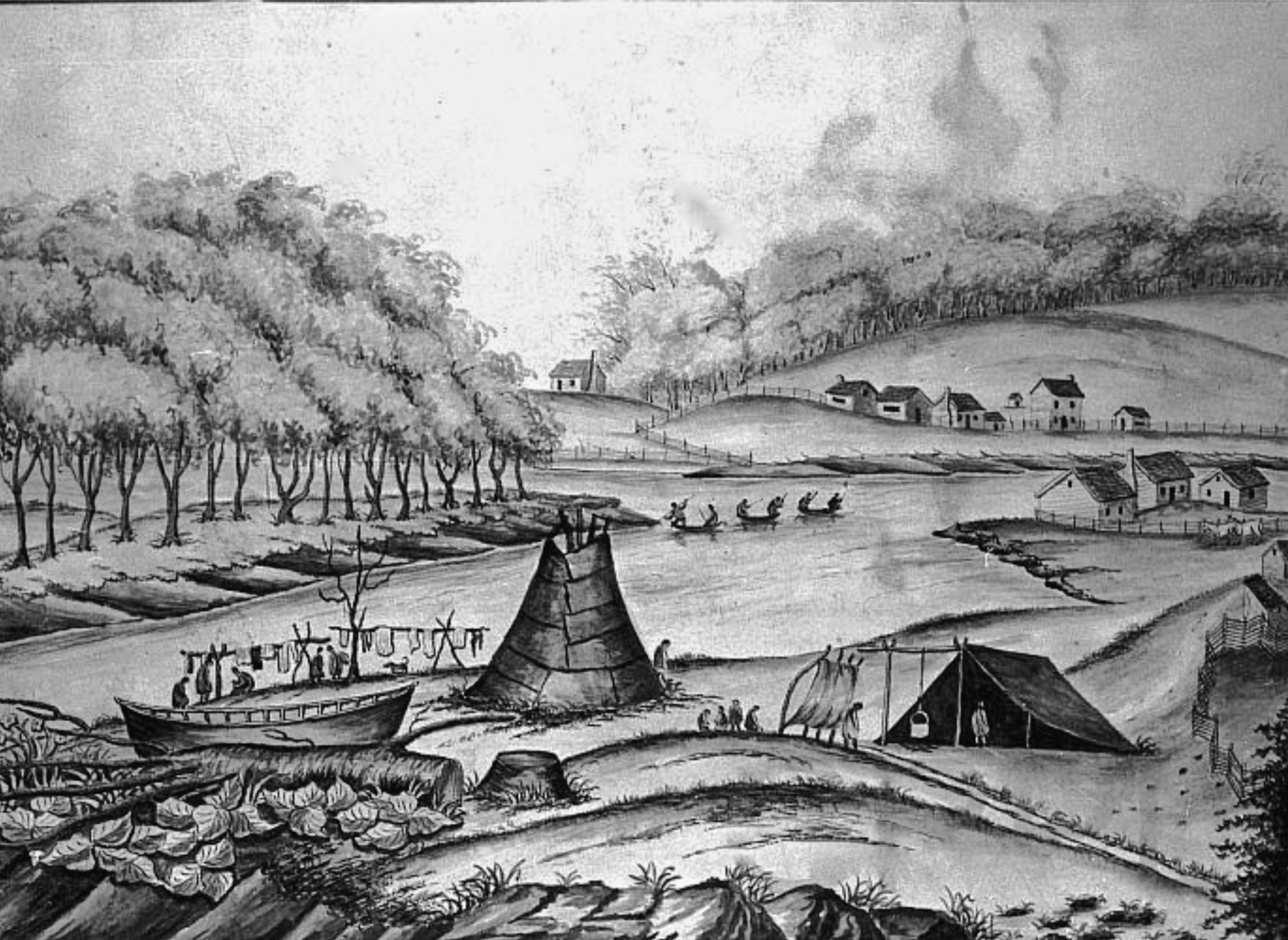
A sketch of Grand Rapids in 1831. The collection of houses across the river on its west side is the Baptist mission. The three buildings in the middle right are Louis Campau's trading post.

Shortly after, Isaac McCoy, a Baptist minister, established a mission station in what was to become Grand Rapids, Campau arrived in the area at the suggestion of William Brewster, a fur trader with American Fur Company, who was his competitor. Campau became known as the official founder of Grand Rapids.

In 1826, Campau built his cabin, trading post, and blacksmith shop on the east bank of the Grand River near the rapids, where he found that the area Native Americans were "friendly and peaceable". Campau traveled to Detroit and returned a year later with his wife and $5,000 of trade goods to trade with the Odawa and Ojibwa for fur. Campau's younger brother Touissant would often assist him with his enterprise.

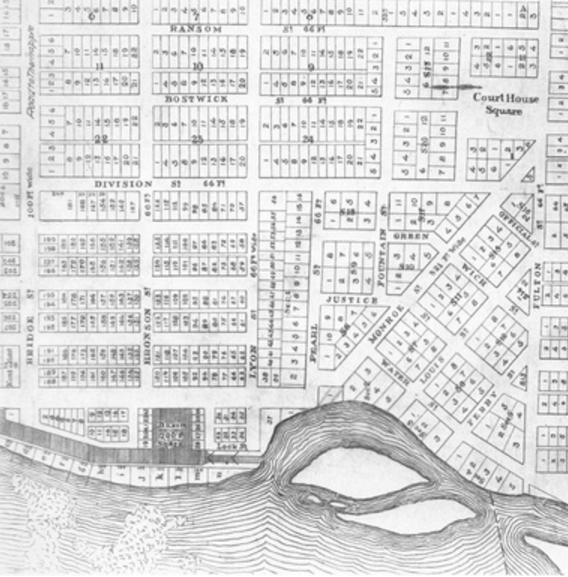
An 1833 plat map of Grand Rapids, depicting the two villages created by Louis Campau and Lucius Lyon that abutted at Pearl Street. Lyon followed the English grid system and Campau's plat followed Native American trails.

In 1831, a federal survey was performed of the Northwest Territory and land was offered for sale. Campau bought 72 acres around his trading post and near the Baptist mission for $90 on September 19 of that year. Living at the post were his wife and several members of his family. Some of his brothers and nephews followed him to Grand Rapids. One year later, government surveyor Lucius Lyon purchased land north of Campau's property. Campau surveyed and platted the village following Native American trails. Lyon had platted his property in an English grid format, which meant that there were two adjoining villages, with different platting formats. Campau had formatted his village streets with a row of 16 abutting row houses on Pearl Street that bordered Lyon's village, which made travel through the two villages cumbersome. Travelers had to go north to Division Street to cross into Campau's village.

Campau, who was described as short-tempered, and Lyon also disagreed about the naming of the town when it was platted. Lyon wanted to call it the village of Kent rather than Grand Rapids. Lyon and land speculators from New York had formed the Kent Company, which was named for judge James Kent in New York, and were interested in land development along the Grand River.

Although Lyon was able to obtain land near the river and created Canal Street to meet up with Campau's Monroe Avenue, eventually the Kent Company was “forced out of existence”. The two villages were merged by Campau under the name of Grand Rapids. It was officially incorporated in 1838 and became a city in 1850.

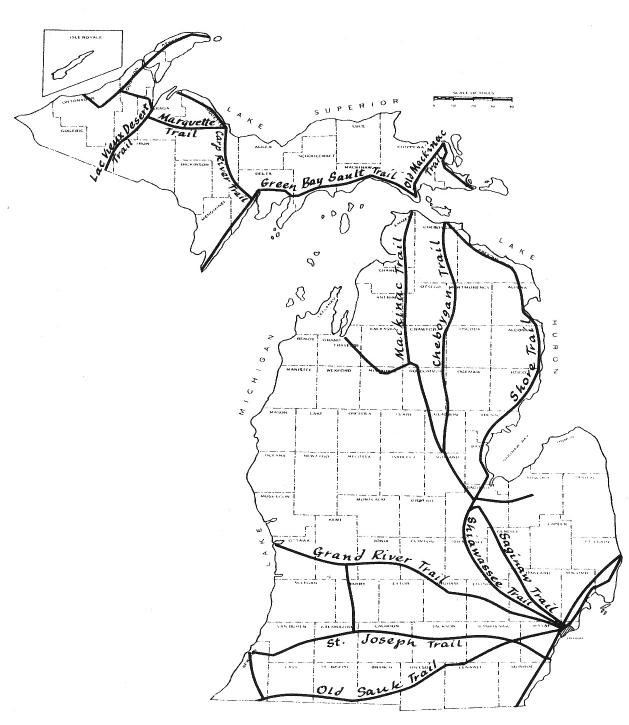
Map of the pre-statehood Indian trails. The Sauk Trail is also known as Chicago Road

In October 1833, he was the first settler in Kent County, Michigan, to buy land from the White Pigeon land office, which was located on the Chicago Road (known earlier as the Sauk Trail) that linked Chicago and Detroit.

== Indian treaties ==
Both Louis and his brother Antoine were involved in treaty negotiations that made them a lot of money. Louis was involved in the Treaty of Denver in 1855, and he received a sizeable payout for the negotiations. The Treaty of Detroit with the federal government meant that one of the signers, Cobmoosa, would relocate with his tribe from the Grand Rapids area to Oceana County, Michigan. The treaty was signed by 54 other leaders of Odawa and Chippewa tribes in Detroit. In exchange for their ancestral lands, roughly $540,000 in cash and goods were split among all of the represented tribes. (Note: The amount of the payment varies from 538,400 to $540,000.) Much of it went to "white friends", like Campau; $500 went to the chiefs and $100 to headmen. It was to be paid out over 10 years.
