= Wabaningo (disambiguation) =

Wabaningo, Michigan is a place in the United States.

Wabaningo may also refer to:

- Wabiwindego (died 1837), or Wabaningo, leader of the Grand River Band of Ottawa
- Camp Wabaningo, a Boy Scouts of America camp in Illinois
