= Alvah Bradish =

American portrait painter (1806–1901)

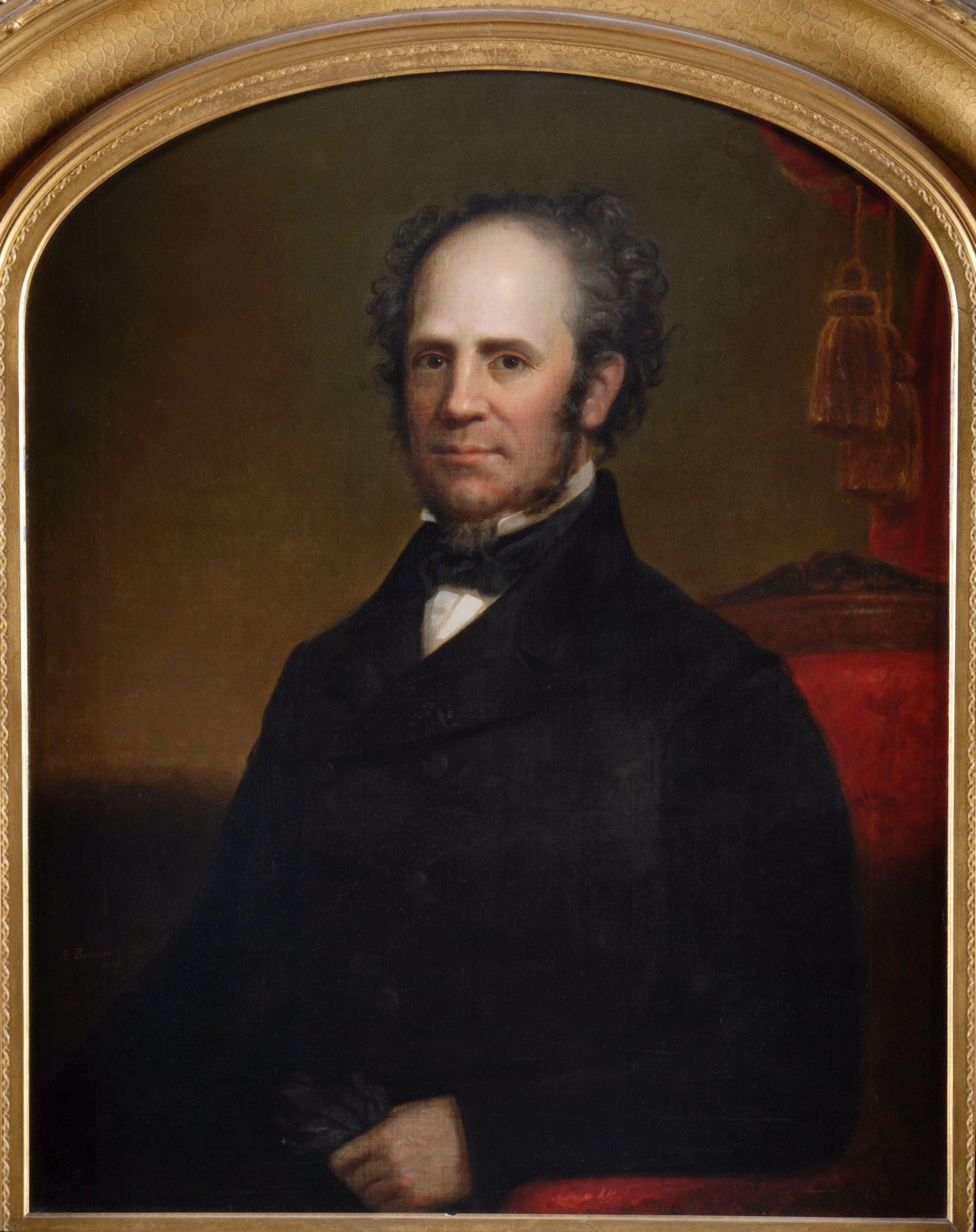
Portrait of Horatio Seymour (c.1850)

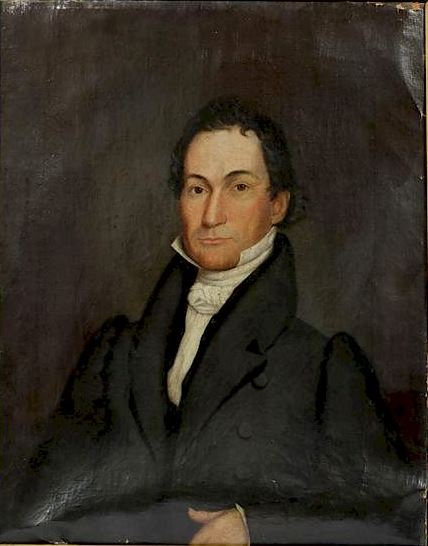
Portrait of his uncle, Luther Bradish; later the Lieutenant Governor of New York

Alvah Bradish (1806, Sherburne, New York - April 19, 1901, Detroit) was an American portrait painter and professor. During his career, he completed over 500 portraits of notable people in New York and Michigan; as well as many people who can no longer be identified. He also painted for brief periods in Canada and Jamaica. There is no record of any formal artistic training he may have had.

== Biography ==
He was one of four sons born to Samuel Morton Bradish (1777-1812), a surveyor from Worcester, Massachusetts, and his wife Mary Finch (1778-1843). After his father's death, his family moved to Fredonia, where he grew up.

From 1837 to 1846, he was an itinerant portrait painter, based in Rochester, New York. He was married in 1839, to Lydia Douglass-Houghton; daughter of Judge Jacob Houghton (1777-1861), originally of Boston, and Lydia Douglass (1780-1871). Her brother, Douglass Houghton, would become the first State Geologist of Michigan. They had three children.

After 1846, he returned to Fredonia, but also traveled extensively. The year 1849 found him in Kingston, Jamaica, where he sent some specimens of fish to the University of Michigan. This was prompted by the fact that his younger brother, Josiah (1810-1892), who had become a surveyor like his father, had gone to Michigan in 1836, at the invitation of Houghton, and settled there permanently a few years later.

In 1850, Alvah was induced to follow him and settled near Detroit. Two years later, he was engaged to lecture on the fine arts at the University, and presented with an honorary Master of Arts degree, along with the title of Professor. For six years, however, he received no compensation and was not allowed to teach; merely accumulating relevant materials. He finally obtained permission to teach a few courses and, in 1861, the senior class requested that he be permitted to lecture them. In 1863, the courses he had been teaching were summarily discontinued. He then quit his position and returned to Detroit, where he lived for the remainder of his life.

His notable sitters during his University period included Lewis Cass, Gov. Austin Blair, Mayor Zina Pitcher, Joseph Campau (a merchant), and University President Henry Philip Tappan. He continued to paint well into the 1880s.

His body was returned to Fredonia for burial.

== Writings by Bradish ==
- Memoir of Douglass Houghton, first state geologist of Michigan. With an appendix, containing reports, or abstracts of the first Geological survey, and a chronological statement of the progress of geological exploration in Michigan, Detroit, Raynor & Taylor, printers, 1889 Full text online @ the HathiTrust
- Remarks on the fine arts department in the University of Michigan. With a history of the art lectures in that institution, including the "Memorial" document addressed to the board of Regents / (Ann Arbor, Mich., 1868) Full text online @ the HathiTrust
