= Jonathan P. Fay =

American politician

Member of the Michigan House of Representatives from the Wayne County district
- In office November 2, 1835 – March 12, 1836 (died)
- Succeeded by: Charles Moran

Personal details
- Born: 1757 or 1758
- Died: March 12, 1836 (aged 78) Detroit, Michigan
- Party: Democratic

Jonathan Prescott Fay (1757 or 1758 – March 12, 1836) was an American medical doctor and politician who served in the Michigan House of Representatives in its first session following adoption of the state's constitution in 1835, and died while in office.

== Biography ==
Jonathan Fay was originally from Massachusetts; sources say he was from either Boston or Sutton, Massachusetts. He was a medical doctor and partner of Dr. Thomas B. Clark in Detroit. Fay was an early pioneer and landowner of Huron Township, Michigan, although he never lived there himself.

He was a Democrat and was elected to the first session of the Michigan House of Representatives following adoption of the state constitution in 1835. He died while the Michigan Legislature was in session in Detroit, on March 12, 1836, aged 78. Both houses of the legislature adjourned to participate in his funeral. Fay was succeeded by Charles Moran for the extra session of the legislature that year.

=== Family ===
Fay was married to Charlotte Lewis, the sister of future Detroit mayor Alexander Lewis. Following Fay's death, she married Henry P. Bridge.
