= Downtown Lowell Historic District =

- U.S. National Register of Historic Places
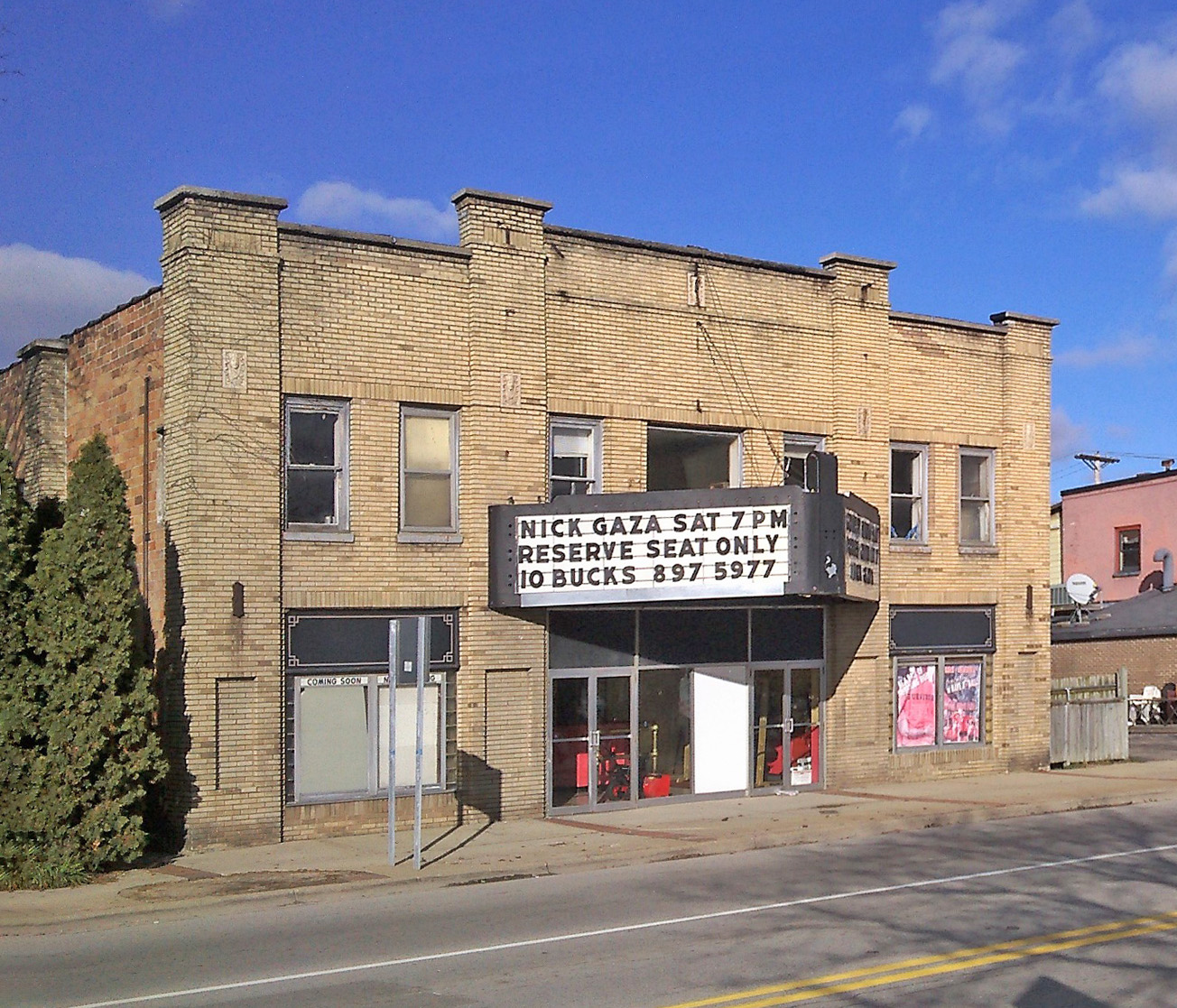
- Strand Theatre
- Interactive map
- Location: Roughly along Main St. bet. Hudson and Washington, Lowell, Michigan
- Coordinates: 42°56′04″N 85°20′16″W
- Area: 15 acres (6.1 ha)
- Built: 1904
- Built by: Morgan Lyon, Freeman S. Jones, Robert Graham
- Architect: McDole Shaw, Colonel H. H. Vinton
- Architectural style: Late Victorian, Art Deco
- NRHP reference No.: 99001539
- Added to NRHP: December 9, 1999

The Downtown Lowell Historic District is a primarily commercial historic district located along Main Street (M-21), roughly between Hudson and Washington Streets, in Lowell, Michigan. The district was listed on the National Register of Historic Places in 1999.

== History ==
The first European settler in this area was Daniel Marsac, a French fur trader, who arrived in 1831. In 1835, Marsac purchased what is now the east side of Lowell and founded a new settlement, naming it Dansville. By 1844, there was a bridge across the Flat River at Dansville, which was quickly followed by a dam and gristmill. In 1850, Marsac sold his land to Able Avery, who platted the area. Arba Richards and Richard Wickham, owners of what is now the west side of present-day Lowell, followed suit in 1854, naming their new settlement "Lowell." Both Dansville and Lowell existed side-by-side until 1861, when they merged and incorporated as the village of Lowell.

The 1850s started the rapid increase of Lowell's population, and the growth if the central business district. A number of mills opened, spurred by the damming of the Flat River. The Detroit, Grand Haven and Milwaukee Railway arrived in 1858, making Lowell easily accessible. Starting after the Civil War, a boom in commercial business began in Lowell, as prosperous farmers and mill owners began spending their wealth. Over the next three decades, a number of commercial buildings were constructed, many with multiple storefronts, and a variety of businesses moved in. These new brick blocks supplanted the wooden buildings that had been located in the downtown area initially. Merchants included Joseph Lowthian Hudson, later the founder of Hudson's department store in Detroit, who operated a store in Lowell from 1888 to 1890.

After the turn of the century, new styles of buildings were constructed downtown. Substantial flooding in 1904 washed away the buildings straddling the river, and a large fire in 1905 demolished several buildings. However, the turn of the century also marked the end of Lowell's growth, with little population added over the next 80 years. Only a handful of buildings were constructed after 1910, leaving downtown Lowell looking much as it did at that time.

== Description ==
The Downtown Lowell Historic District covers both sides of five city blocks along Main Street, on either side of the Flat River. The district contains 56 buildings and structures, 44 of which contribute to the historic character of the district. Thirty-nine of the contributing buildings are brick and/or cement commercial blocks of one to three stories in height. The remaining structures include one brick residence (the Graham House, listed separately on the Register), one wood frame industrial building; two bridges and the Jaycees Park. Nearly all buildings are sited directly on the sidewalk, and the majority were constructed from 1865-1890, with nearly all constructed before 1910. The buildings are typically Italianate in character, but there are some Romanesque Revival and Art Deco structures included in the district.
