= Wabiwindego =

Native American leader (d. 1837)

Wabiwindego (literally “White Wendigo” or sometimes "White Giant") (d.1837), also spelled Wobwindego, Wobiwidigo, or Wabaningo, and known among the Ojibwe as Waabishkindip (literally “White-Headed”), was a leader of the Grand River Band of Ottawa in what would become the U.S. State of Michigan. He negotiated the 1836 Treaty of Washington with the federal government on behalf of the Grand River Ottawa, leading to the admission of the State of Michigan to the Union. Several villages he led formed the basis for several modern Michigan towns, including Lowell, Whitehall, and Montague.

Wabiwindego shared leadership of his band with Keewaycooshcum until 1821, when Keewaycooshcum was exiled to Manistee, the most remote of the Grand River bands' villages, for selling Ottawa land in the 1821 Treaty of Chicago without the tribe's authorization. Wabiwindego later shared leadership with his son-in-law, Cobmoosa.

== Treaty of Washington ==
The completion of the Erie Canal in 1825 significantly lowered the cost of travel by ship from the east coast of the United States to the Great Lakes. Where before there had been as many Ottawa as colonial settlers in Michigan, with most settlers living in and around Detroit, a surge of settlers into western Michigan over the following decade left the Ottawa outnumbered 25-to-1.

By 1836, the possibility that Ottawa from the L'Arbre Croche band to the north might promise the Grand River Ottawa's land north of the Grand River to the United States prompted Wabiwindego and other Grand River Ottawa leaders to write President Andrew Jackson a letter preemptively refusing the cede any land or remove their bands west of the Mississippi. However, after an especially harsh winter and a year-long outbreak of smallpox, the Grand River Ottawa's negotiation position was severely weakened. In March 1836, Wabiwindego led two dozen young Ottawa men to Washington, D.C. to try and stop a potential treaty between the L'Arbre Croche and the United States, taking the place of the tribe's foremost leader, Noahquageshik, in order for them to appear more aloof to the possibility of sale.

At negotiations in Washington, however, Wabiwindego and the Ottawa agreed to sell the Grand River lands and the eastern coast of Lake Michigan to the United States. They did so because of the offer of permanent reservations in west and northwest Michigan, as well as regular annuities, hunting rights, and access to a blacksmith, Western farming implements, and various other benefits to help smooth any integration efforts. Wabiwindego was designated in the treaty as a "first class" leader, and assigned to receive a $500 annuity for his tribe.

Unknown to Wabiwindego and the Ottawa, however, Jackson's negotiators knew that neither Jackson nor the United States Senate would ratify the permanent reservation clause, as both had a policy of forcing all Native American tribes to resettle west of the Mississippi River. After the Ottawa left Washington, the Senate added a five-year expiration date to the Michigan reservations. When the Ottawa met to discuss and reluctantly sign the altered treaty later that summer on Mackinac Island, Wabiwindego refused to sign. Within a year of the treaty, the United States admitted the State of Michigan to the Union.

== Founding of Lowell ==
Wabiwindego's largest village sat at the junction of the Grand River and the Flat River. In 1828, Wabiwindego took in a young settler named Daniel Marsac, who built a trading post in the village, around which grew a small community of colonial settlers. In 1847, Marsac purchased land under the village and platted it as "Dansville." In 1851, a post office was established there named "Lowell" after its township. The community was replatted in 1854 and renamed after the post office. It incorporated as a village in 1861.

The Lowell Area Historical Museum regularly recreates the Ottawa village and the meeting of Wabiwindego and Marsac in a pageant called “The River of Time.”

== Founding of Whitehall and Montague ==
Wabiwindego also maintained a small farming village on Lake Michigan near the mouth of the White River at what was called Waabgankiishkbogong, "The Place of White Clay." In 1837, Wabiwindego invited passing lumberman and settler Charles Mears and his brother Albert to stay at the village. Mears established a lumber camp there that grew into the towns of Whitehall and Montague by the 1860s.

In 1861, Albert Mears returned to Whitehall and Montague and told stories of his meeting with Wabiwindego. An article in the Montague Lumberman newspaper in 1876 recounted Albert Mears' account using the spelling "Wabaningo." Over the rest of the 19th century, Wabaningo became a figure of folklore in White Lake culture. Locals began calling the land near the former Ottawa village the Wabaningo Flats, and in 1897 the Sylvan Beach Resort Company built a hotel nearby that acquired the nickname "The Wabaningo." In 1906, the local women's social club built a recreation center named the Wabaningo Club, which began putting on a variety show in August 1909 called the "Wabaningo Jinks." The local post office branch opened around the same time called the Wabaningo Post Office. A Boy Scout camp nearby called Camp Wabaningo operated during the 20th Century.

== Death and legacy ==
In the winter of 1837, Wabiwindego died during a smallpox outbreak so deadly that “almost without exception, every house [on the Grand River] has been literally a hospital, both among the natives and white inhabitants.” After his death, his son Shagwabeno assumed leadership of the band.

In 1855, Shagwabeno and another of Wabiwindego's sons, Aishkibegosh, negotiated a new treaty with the United States in Detroit which created permanent reservations for the Grand River Ottawa in Michigan. The bands are organized today as the federally-recognized Little River Band of Ottawa Indians and the Grand River Band of Ottawa Indians, which is pending federal recognition.
