= Croul–Palms House =

Historic house in Michigan, United States

- U.S. National Register of Historic Places
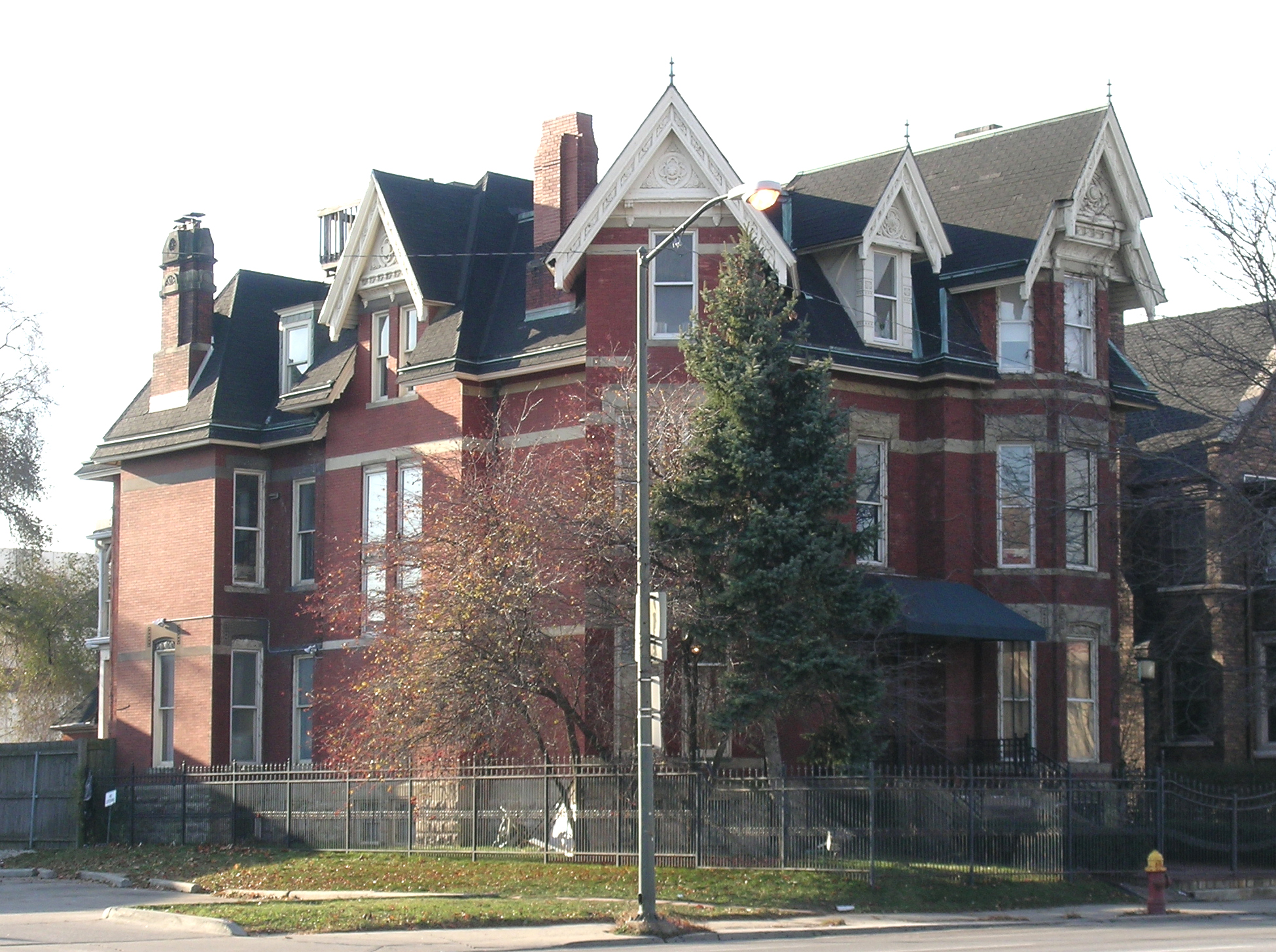
- Interactive map
- Location: 1394 East Jefferson Avenue; Detroit, Michigan
- Coordinates: 42°20′1″N 83°1′55″W
- Built: 1881
- Architect: William Scott
- Architectural style: Queen Anne
- NRHP reference No.: 83003790
- Added to NRHP: December 20, 1983

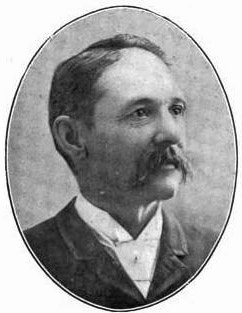
Jerome Croul

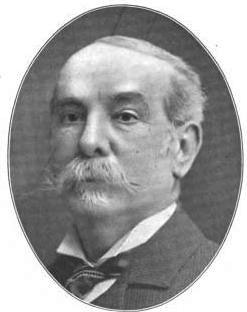
Francis F. Palms

The Croul–Palms House is a private residence located at 1394 East Jefferson Avenue in Detroit, Michigan. The house is named after its first two owners, Jerome Croul and Francis Palms. It was listed on the National Register of Historic Places in 1983.

== History ==
In 1881, Jerome Croul commissioned William Scott to build this house at a cost of $25,000. Croul was a successful merchant of woolens and sheepskins, owning (with his brother William) the firm of Croul Brothers; he was also a Detroit Fire Commissioner.

In 1887, Croul sold the house to Celimene Palms, the wife of Francis. Francis Palms was a major Detroit landowner, inheriting a substantial fortune from his father. Francis died in 1905, but his wife continued to live in the house until her death in 1914. The structure was converted into a boarding house with 25 rooms. The Palms family continued to own the house through their realty company until 1945. In 1954, the house was again converted into an apartment building with eight apartments. In 1983, the house was restored for use as office space.

== Description ==
The Croul–Palms house boasts irregular massing, contrasting materials, and a picturesque roofline, all details characteristic of Queen Anne style architecture. The house is 2½ stories, and is constructed from red brick on a rock-faced stone foundation. There are additional curved stone details, as well as stone banding and stone window hoods. The house has bay windows stretching the full three stories, and the multi-level roof boasts projecting gables and decorative chimney caps. The exterior of the house is original but for the demolition of front and side porches and a small third-floor balconet, and the replacement of the slate roof.

There was originally a two-story brick barn behind the house, built a year after the house itself; the barn was demolished in 1954.

In 1906 the barn behind the house was leased to Father Weinman who started a settlement house for young immigrant women from Ireland, Italy and Syria. A few years later, the settlement house had grown in size and the location was moved. The organization became the League of Catholic women and kept that name until the early 2000s. The organization founded by Father Weinman is now known as Matrix Human Services, one of the largest and most impactful non-profits serving the City of Detroit. Matrix's current headquarters is on Woodbridge, coincidently in a building right behind its founding location in the Francis Palm's barn. http://www.matrixhumanservices.org
