= Lowell, Michigan =

- City
- City of Lowell
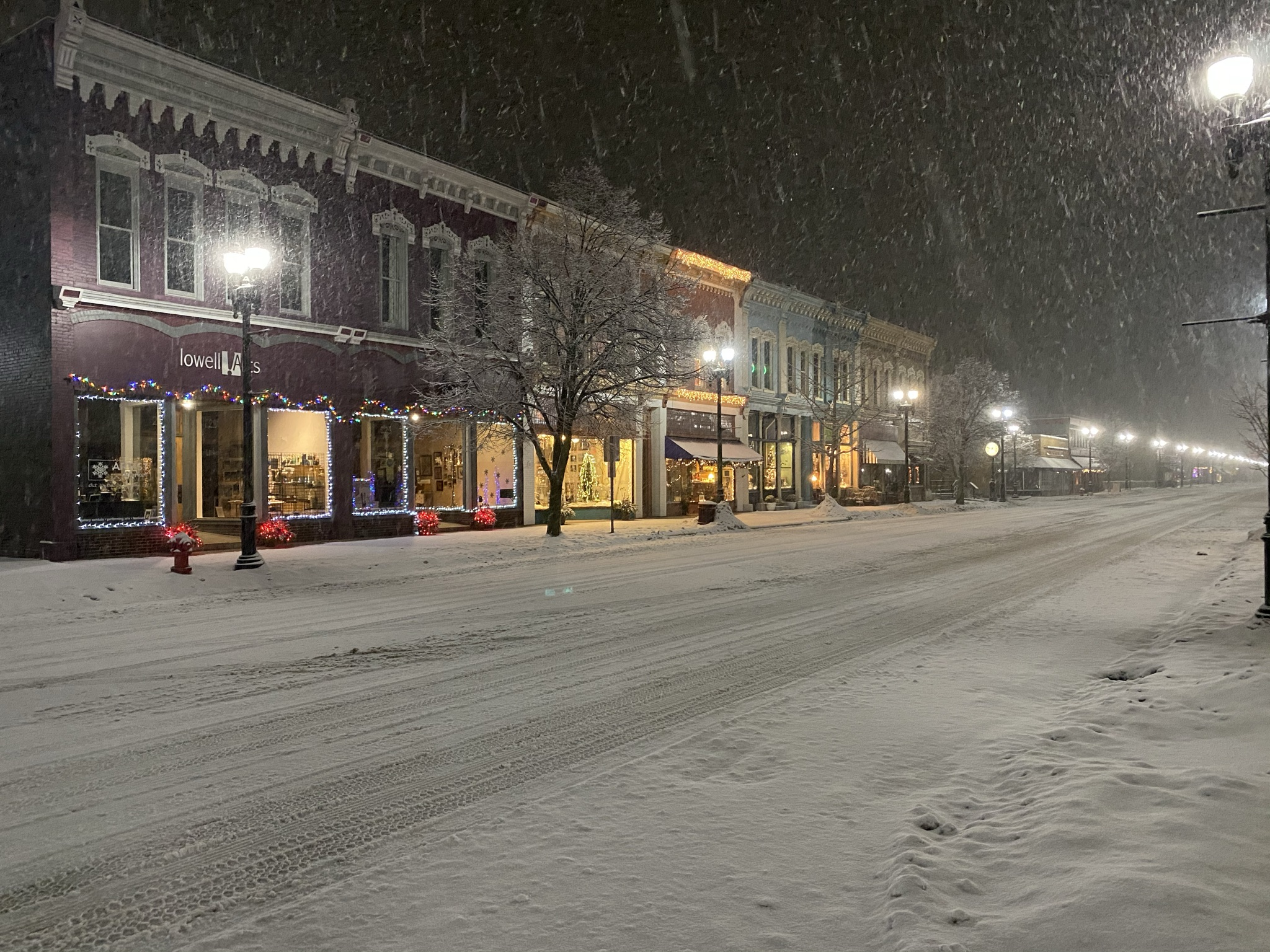
- Historic district along Main Street (M-21)

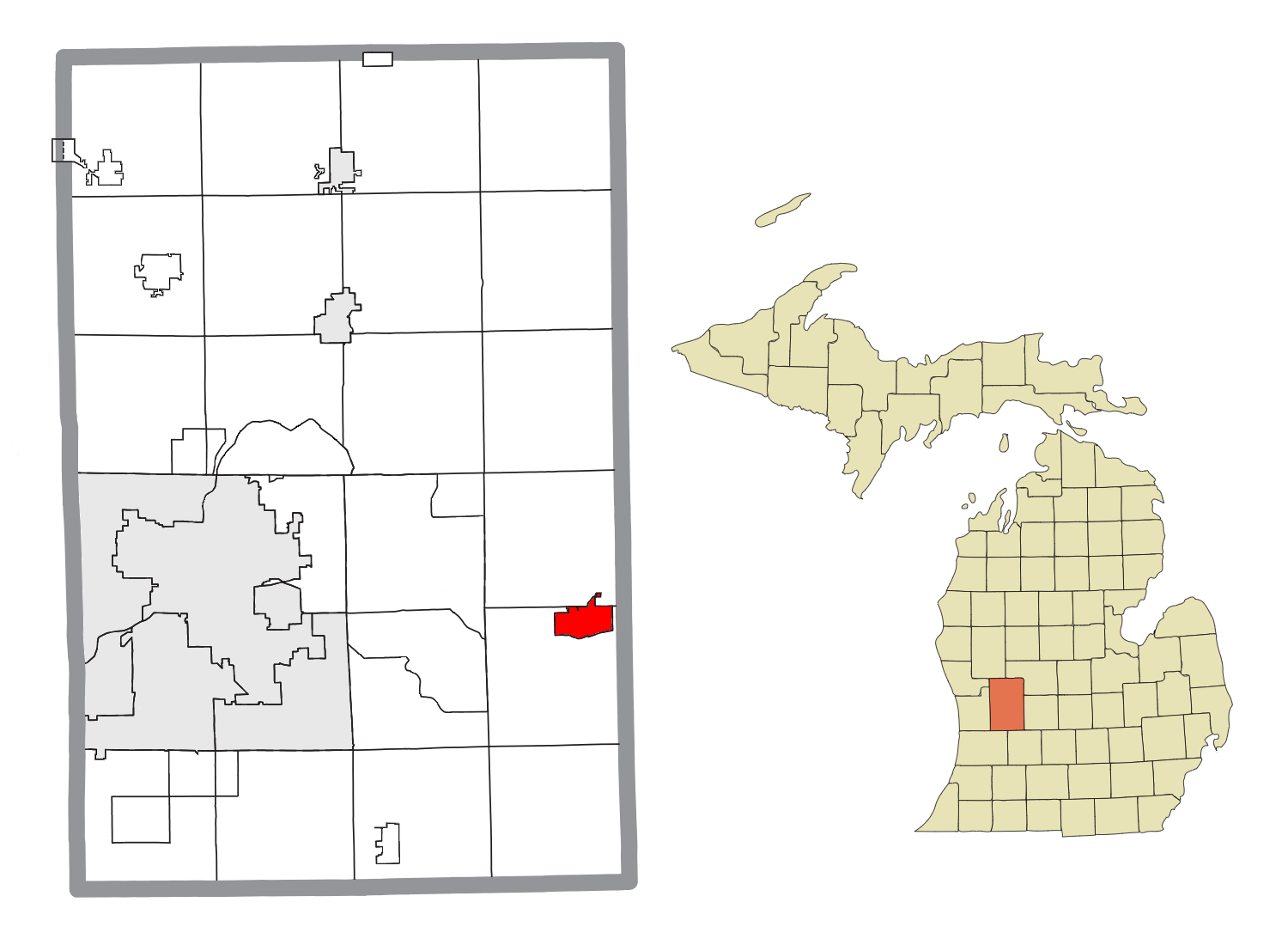
- Location within Kent County

- Location within the state of Michigan Location within the United States
- Coordinates: 42°56′06″N 85°20′45″W
- Country: United States
- State: Michigan
- County: Kent
- Founded: 1831

Government
  - Type: Mayor–council
  - Mayor: Mike DeVore
  - Clerk: Amy Brown
  - Manager: Michael Burns

Area
  - Total: 3.10 sq mi (8.03 km^{2})
  - Land: 2.88 sq mi (7.46 km^{2})
  - Water: 0.22 sq mi (0.57 km^{2})
- Elevation: 640 ft (200 m)

Population (2020)
  - Total: 4,142
  - Density: 1,438.2/sq mi (555.29/km^{2})
- Time zone: UTC-5 (Eastern (EST))
  - Summer (DST): UTC-4 (EDT)
- ZIP code(s): 49331
- Area code: 616
- FIPS code: 26-49540
- GNIS feature ID: 1626644
- Website: Official website

Lowell is a city in Kent County of the U.S. state of Michigan. The population was 4,142 at the 2020 census.

Lowell is part of the Grand Rapids metropolitan area and is about 15 miles (24.1 km) east of the city of Grand Rapids. The city is mostly surrounded by Lowell Township to the south, but the two are administered autonomously. Lowell is situated just north of where the Flat River meets the Grand River. The city's downtown area is listed on the National Register of Historic Places as the Downtown Lowell Historic District.

== History ==
The earliest modern residents of the Flat River and Grand River were the Grand River Odawa, who established several villages along the Grand River. In the first decades of the 19th century, the village was led by Wabiwindego and Keewaycooshcum, and later by Cobmoosa. In the 1830s, Cobmoosa purchased the land under the Odawa village in the name of his father, fur trader Antoine Campau. The Odawa remained at their village on the Flat River until 1858, when they moved to a reservation at Manistee, Michigan.

The modern city of Lowell was founded in 1831 by Daniel Marsac as a trading post with this existing Odawa village, built on the south bank of the Grand River. During the first years of his trading post, Marsac lived with the Grand River Odawa leader Wabiwindego. In 1847, he purchased land on the north side of the river and platted it as "Dansville". In 1851, a post office was established there named "Lowell" after the township. The community was replatted in 1854 and renamed after the post office. It incorporated as a village in 1861.

=== Lowell Showboat ===
From 1932 to 1977, Lowell hosted annual two-hour minstrel shows on a special showboat, named Robert E. Lee after the famous Mississippi steamer of that name. The shows featured both musicians and blackface performers annually until 1967, when Louis Armstrong refused to perform on the steamboat alongside men in blackface. In 1968 there was again no minstrelsy since Dinah Shore made the same requirement, but local newspapers regretted the lack of old-fashioned minstrel humor, and as a result blackface returned in 1969. In 1974, Gerald Ford attended the minstrel show shortly before becoming president. Blackface ended permanently in 1977 when Pearl Bailey again made it a necessary condition for her performance. In 2017, the name Robert E. Lee was removed from the showboat. One City Council member defended the name by invoking the Lost Cause of the Confederacy, and resigned shortly afterwards.

In the 1970s, several stores on Main Street decorated their storefronts in New Orleans style to celebrate the showboat.

== Geography ==
According to the U.S. Census Bureau, the city has a total area of 3.10 square miles (8.03 km^{2}), of which 2.88 square miles (7.46 km^{2}) is land and 0.22 square miles (0.57 km^{2}) (7.10%) is water.

Lowell is the home of the North Country Trail Association. In the Lowell area, the trail runs just north of downtown and along portions of the Flat River.

=== Major highways ===
- M-21 runs east and west through the center of the community.

=== Climate ===
This climatic region is typified by large seasonal temperature differences, with warm to hot (and often humid) summers and cold (sometimes severely cold) winters. According to the Köppen Climate Classification system, Lowell has a humid continental climate, abbreviated "Dfb" on climate maps.

== Demographics ==
Historical population
Census	Pop.	Note	%±
1860	547		—
1870	1,503		174.8%
1880	1,538		2.3%
1890	1,829		18.9%
1900	1,736		−5.1%
1910	1,761		1.4%
1920	1,730		−1.8%
1930	1,919		10.9%
1940	1,944		1.3%
1950	2,191		12.7%
1960	2,545		16.2%
1970	3,068		20.6%
1980	3,707		20.8%
1990	3,983		7.4%
2000	4,013		0.8%
2010	3,783		−5.7%
2020	4,142		9.5%
U.S. Decennial Census

=== 2020 census ===
As of the 2020 census, Lowell had a population of 4,142. The median age was 37.0 years. 23.8% of residents were under the age of 18 and 16.0% of residents were 65 years of age or older. For every 100 females there were 93.9 males, and for every 100 females age 18 and over there were 89.0 males age 18 and over.

99.9% of residents lived in urban areas, while 0.1% lived in rural areas.

There were 1,688 households in Lowell, of which 33.9% had children under the age of 18 living in them. Of all households, 44.0% were married-couple households, 18.0% were households with a male householder and no spouse or partner present, and 30.6% were households with a female householder and no spouse or partner present. About 28.6% of all households were made up of individuals and 12.0% had someone living alone who was 65 years of age or older.

There were 1,759 housing units, of which 4.0% were vacant. The homeowner vacancy rate was 1.0% and the rental vacancy rate was 4.3%.

Racial composition as of the 2020 census
Race	Number	Percent
White	3,726	90.0%
Black or African American	43	1.0%
American Indian and Alaska Native	18	0.4%
Asian	21	0.5%
Native Hawaiian and Other Pacific Islander	0	0.0%
Some other race	56	1.4%
Two or more races	278	6.7%
Hispanic or Latino (of any race)	190	4.6%

=== 2010 census ===
As of the census of 2010, there were 3,783 people, 1,457 households, and 962 families living in the city. The population density was 1,313.5 inhabitants per square mile (507.1/km^{2}). There were 1,581 housing units at an average density of 549.0 per square mile (212.0/km^{2}). The racial makeup of the city was 94.1% White, 1.3% African American, 0.6% Native American, 0.6% Asian, 1.1% from other races, and 2.3% from two or more races. Hispanic or Latino of any race were 3.0% of the population.

There were 1,457 households, of which 36.4% had children under the age of 18 living with them, 45.8% were married couples living together, 15.5% had a female householder with no husband present, 4.7% had a male householder with no wife present, and 34.0% were non-families. 29.0% of all households were made up of individuals, and 10.2% had someone living alone who was 65 years of age or older. The average household size was 2.50 and the average family size was 3.04.

The median age in the city was 37.1 years. 25.7% of residents were under the age of 18; 8.9% were between the ages of 18 and 24; 25.1% were from 25 to 44; 25.2% were from 45 to 64; and 15% were 65 years of age or older. The gender makeup of the city was 46.3% male and 53.7% female.

=== 2000 census ===
As of the census of 2000, there were 4,013 people, 1,492 households, and 1,008 families living in the city. The population density was 1,391.2 inhabitants per square mile (537.1/km^{2}). There were 1,564 housing units at an average density of 542.2 per square mile (209.3/km^{2}). The racial makeup of the city was 96.21% White, 0.57% African American, 0.62% Native American, 0.42% Asian, 0.12% Pacific Islander, 0.72% from other races, and 1.32% from two or more races. Hispanic or Latino of any race were 2.14% of the population.

There were 1,492 households, out of which 38.7% had children under the age of 18 living with them, 49.1% were married couples living together, 14.0% had a female householder with no husband present, and 32.4% were non-families. 26.7% of all households were made up of individuals, and 10.9% had someone living alone who was 65 years of age or older. The average household size was 2.59 and the average family size was 3.17.

In the city, the population was spread out, with 29.3% under the age of 18, 8.5% from 18 to 24, 30.8% from 25 to 44, 17.6% from 45 to 64, and 13.8% who were 65 years of age or older. The median age was 34 years. For every 100 females, there were 89.0 males. For every 100 females age 18 and over, there were 85.8 males.

The median income for a household in the city was $42,326, and the median income for a family was $49,145. Males had a median income of $36,525 versus $25,625 for females. The per capita income for the city was $17,843. About 4.4% of families and 6.0% of the population were below the poverty line, including 5.3% of those under age 18 and 7.5% of those age 65 or over.

== Recreation ==
Lowell Parks	Location
Creekside Park	Located in the 1600 block of Gee Dr.
Recreation Park	Located in the 300 block of S. Broadway St.
Richards Park	Located in the 300 block of N. Hudson St.
Stoney Lakeside Park	Located in the 1200 block of Bowes Rd.
Lowell Dog Park	Located in the 1200 block of Bowes Rd.

== Education ==
Lowell Area Schools is the local school district. Bushnell and Cherry Creek elementary schools serve the city itself. Lowell Middle School and Lowell High School serve the entire school district.

== Notable people ==
- William Seward Burroughs I, adding machine inventor, founder of the Burroughs Corporation and grandfather of Beat Generation author William S. Burroughs lived in Lowell in the 1860s and graduated from Lowell High School.
- Cobmoosa, operated a trading post where Lowell exists now.
- Mike Dumas, professional football player (retired)
- Mabel Gillespie, farmer, teacher, journalist, politician, lived in Lowell from 1958 to 1967.
- Ernest R. Graham, designer of Chicago landmarks such as the Wrigley Building, Shedd Aquarium, etc., born in Lowell.
- Jennie Harris Oliver, poet, born in Lowell.
- Dave Hildenbrand, Michigan politician
- Anthony Kiedis, Red Hot Chili Peppers lead singer.
- Howard Henry Peckham, professor and historian, Lowell High School graduate.
- Ann Rule, author of true crime novels, born in Lowell, Michigan
- John Addison Scott, U.S. Navy Rear Admiral and Navy Cross recipient.
- Glendon Swarthout, novelist, graduated from Lowell High School.
- Daniel Vosovic, fashion designer, Lowell High School graduate.
