= Joseph Campau House =

Historic house in Michigan, United States

- U.S. National Register of Historic Places
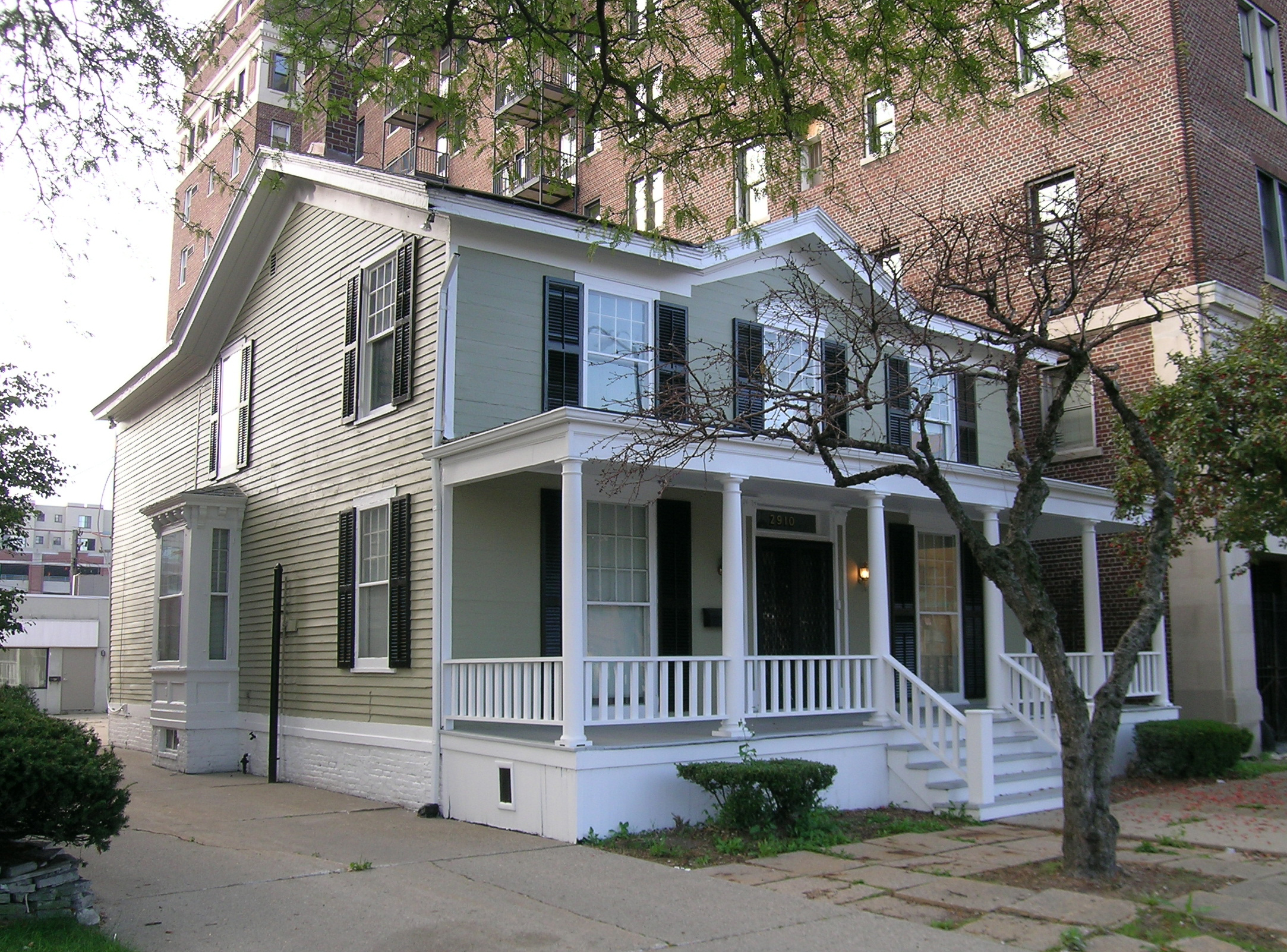
- Interactive map
- Location: 2910 East Jefferson Avenue; Detroit, Michigan
- Coordinates: 42°20′22″N 83°1′8″W
- Built: 1835
- MPS: East Jefferson Avenue Residential TR
- NRHP reference No.: 85002935
- Added to NRHP: October 9, 1985

The Joseph Campau House is a private residence located at 2910 East Jefferson Avenue in Detroit, Michigan. It was listed on the National Register of Historic Places in 1985.

== Description ==
The Joseph Campau House is a two-story house with a symmetrical three-bay façade; the exterior is faced with flush board siding on the front and clapboards on the other three sides. A porch, constructed in the 20th century, spans the front. The exterior is plain, with a pedimental window head center gabled second-story window and a plain entablature board under the eaves as the only decorations.

== Significance ==
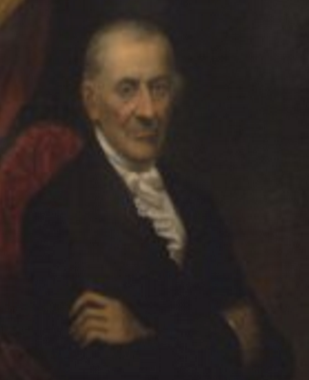
Joseph Campau (1769–1863) was the grandson of one of the original settlers to Fort Detroit and became the state's first millionaire through his real estate endeavors

The house is one of the oldest residences in Detroit. Although he never lived in this house, it was built on land that was originally part of the Joseph Campau farm, a large tract of land awarded to Joseph Campau's grandfather in 1734. Joseph Campau was among Detroit's leading citizens and wealthiest landowners at the dawn of the 19th century.
