= Antoine Dequindre =

Soldier & landowner (1781–1843)

- Born: June 18, 1781; Detroit, Quebec, British America
- Died: February 24, 1843 (aged 61)
- Occupation: Shopkeeper
- Known for: Veteran, War of 1812; participation in Battle of Monguagon

Antoine Dequindre (1781–1843) was a soldier, landowner and shopkeeper in Detroit, Michigan in the first half of the 19th century. He is best known for heroism at the Battle of Monguagon during the War of 1812, when he was serving as a captain in the Michigan Legion. Dequindre Road, which runs through Detroit as well as Oakland and Macomb counties, is named for him.

Dequindre was born in Detroit. He served as an apprentice and clerk, and in 1810 opened his own store in the city. When war broke out with Great Britain in 1812, Dequindre raised a company of riflemen, which joined the Michigan Legion. During the Battle of Monguagon, Dequindre's company was the first to attack and enter the British breastworks, and his men later sank a British gunboat with a cannon mounted on shore. For his conduct, he was tendered a commission as major in the U.S. Army. He declined the position but was thereafter known as Major Dequindre.

Dequindre also served as alderman in Detroit. His sister Adelaide was married to Joseph Campau.
