= Joseph Campau =

Wealthy landowner (1769–1863)

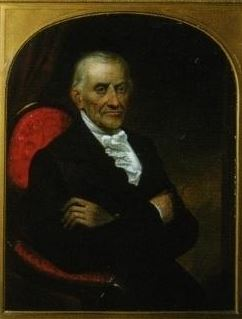
- Joseph Campau by Alvah Bradish (1856)
- Born: February 20, 1769; Detroit, Quebec
- Died: May 13, 1863 (aged 94); Detroit, Michigan, U.S.
- Burial place: Elmwood Cemetery, Detroit, Michigan, U.S.
- Occupation: Merchant
- Spouse: Adelaide Dequindre (m. 1808; died 1863)
- Children: 8
- Relatives: See Campau family

Joseph Campau (February 20, 1769 – May 13, 1863 (Note: The Sibley House states that Campau was born on February 20, but the Detroit Historical Society states that his date of birth is February 2, 1769.)) was a merchant and landowner native to Detroit, considered one of the "Barons of Detroit". He belonged to the Campau family, one of the city's original settler families. At the beginning of the 19th century, he was among the wealthiest citizens in Michigan and is believed to have been the first millionaire in the state. He was an early benefactor of the University of Michigan.

Born in Detroit in 1769, Campau found success in business at an early age. He operated three trading posts and a merchant store in Detroit until the early 1800s. He held several public offices in the city and served as an officer in the Michigan Territory Militia during the War of 1812. He was known as Chemokamun ("big shot") by Chief Joshua Wawanosh and other Native American chiefs. Along with his nephew, John R. Williams, he founded the Democratic Free Press and Michigan Intelligencer, which would later become the Detroit Free Press. At the time of his death, he was the largest landowner in Michigan, holding a significant percentage of the stock in both the Michigan Central Railroad and the Bank of Michigan.

Campau was a somewhat controversial figure; contemporary publications labeled him a slumlord. He died in 1863 and was buried in Elmwood Cemetery rather than the traditional Catholic burial site at Mount Elliott Cemetery, as he had been excommunicated from the Catholic Church in 1817 following heated disagreements with Gabriel Richard, the rector of Ste. Anne.

Joseph Campau Street in Hamtramck and Detroit was named for him, and by association, Jos. Campau Historic District.

== Early life ==
Campau was born on February 2, 1769, in Detroit. His parents were Jacques Campau and Catherine Ménard. Campau's great-grandfather, Jacques Campau (1677–1751), left Montreal and settled at Fort Pontchartrain du Détroit in 1708, one year after his brother Michel. Antoine de la Mothe Cadillac founded Fort Pontchartrain du Détroit in 1701 and sold 68 land grants between 1707 and 1710, two of which were sold to the Campau brothers. Jacques had previously served as a secretary and an officer to Cadillac. Jacques sold furs, grains, and bread at "one of the finest merchant stores" in Detroit by the 1740s, according to Clarence M. Burton.

In his youth, Joseph Campau traded with the Native Americans. His younger brother, Barnabé aka Barnabas, was also a wealthy businessman. He was a fur trader, merchant, and landowner. One of his properties was Belle Isle.

== Real estate business ==
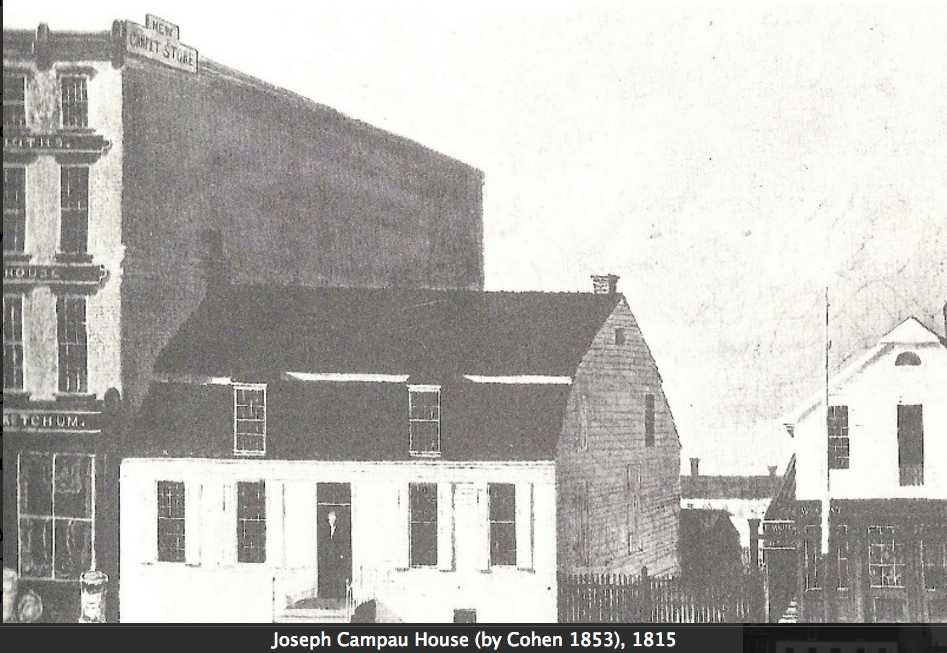
Painting by Frederick Cohen of Joseph Campau's house. The house was built in 1815 and the painting was made as it appeared in 1853.

Campau began his business career as a merchant. He purchased goods from Boston, the first person to do so in Detroit, and sold them at his store on Atwater. Campau spoke the languages of several Native American tribes, French and English to his customers at his three trading posts at Saginaw, on Lake St. Clair, and on Lake Erie. He was called Chemokamun ("big shot") by Chief Wawanosh of Sarnia and Chief Maccounse of Lake St. Clair.

Campau was the first in the city's real estate industry to sell and lease houses that had been built on vacant lots. He was sometimes considered a "slum lord" who was likely to charge late fees with high interest rates to delinquent tenants. However, an obituary stated of Campau, "[t]o the honest and industrious, he was always lenient."

C. M. Burton asserts that he was the state's first millionaire. He had become the state's largest landowner, owning property worth more than $10 million. Campau held a large percentage of the stock in Michigan Central Railroad and Bank of Michigan.

Campau held multiple public office positions. He was City Trustee in 1802, City Treasurer, City Inspector of water barrels and City Assessor, appraiser, and over-seer of the poor. In 1802, he was an original trustee of Detroit at its incorporation.

He served in the Michigan Territory Militia as captain in 1806. During the War of 1812, he was a major in the U.S. Army.

With his nephew, John R. Williams, Campau operated the Democratic Free Press and Michigan Intelligencer, which eventually evolved into the Detroit Free Press.

== Death ==
Campau died on July 23, 1863, and was buried at Elmwood Cemetery in Detroit. The Masons held the largest funeral in the city's history until that time for Campau.

His wife was buried at Catholic Mount Elliott Cemetery, as are some of his children. His estate was worth $3 million.

== Personal life ==
Campau was married to Adelaide Dequindre on May 18, 1808. Their children, born through 1829, were Joseph, Adelaide, Dennis, Catherine, Jacques Joseph, Theodore Joseph, Matilda, and Alexander Timothy. His daughter Catherine married Francis Palms, the largest landowner in Michigan during the mid-1850s.

Campau bought a nine-year-old African boy in Montreal as a slave who was to be freed at 21 years of age. Campau and Father Gabriel Richard, the priest of St. Anne's Church, engaged in "heated disagreements" about Campau's having sold whiskey to Native Americans and joining the Masons. As a result, he was excommunicated from the Catholic Church in 1817.

== Joseph Campau residences ==
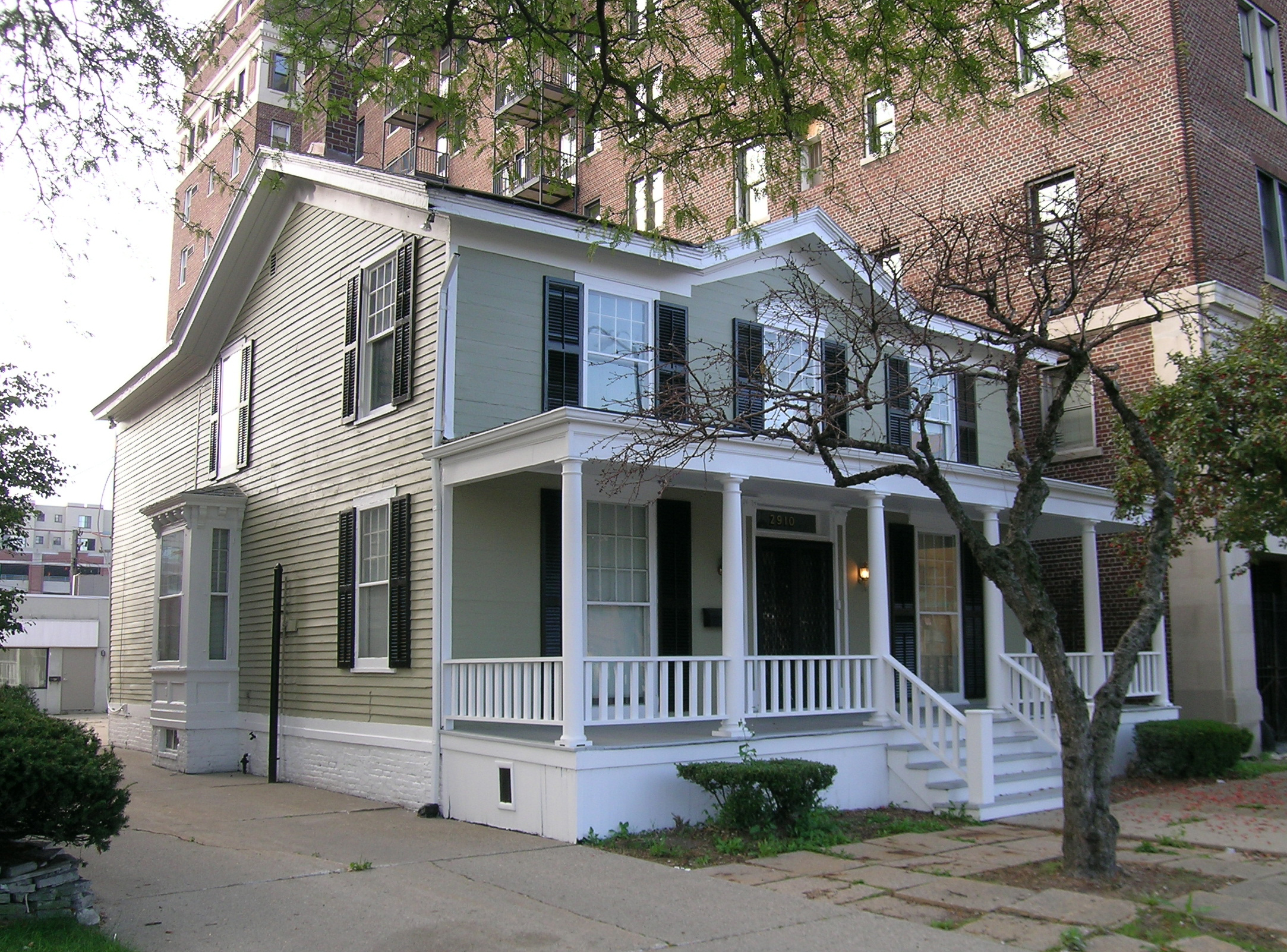
Joseph Campau House, a National Register of Historic Places listing

Campau lived in a log house on the south side of Jefferson Avenue, between Shelby and Griswold, that was built after the fire of 1805. Frederick E. Cohen made a painting in 1853 of Campau house that was built in 1815. It was also located between Shelby and Griswold on Jefferson Avenue. (Note: In 1880 the Campau house was torn down. Burton states that the house was "erected" in 1813 and the Detroit Historical Society said that it was built in 1815.)

The Joseph Campau House on 2910 East Jefferson Avenue in Detroit is attributed to Campau, but it is said that he never lived there. One of the oldest residences in Detroit, it was built on land that was originally part of the Joseph Campau farm. It came into the Campau family in 1734 when it was awarded to his grandfather.
