= Francis Palms =

American businessman (1809–1886)

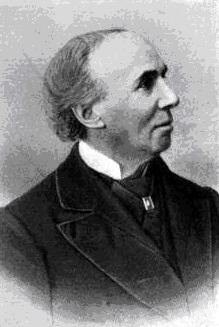
- Francis Palms, early Michigan tycoon.
- Born: Francis Frederick Palms; 1809; Antwerp, First French Empire
- Died: November 4, 1886 (aged 76–77); Detroit, Michigan, US
- Occupation: Businessman
- Spouses: Martha Burnett; Catherine Campau

Francis Palms (1809–1886) was the largest landholder in Michigan during the mid-1850s. He had major business interests as well and was nicknamed "Croesus" because of his wealth.

== Life and career ==
He was born in Antwerp, First French Empire, in what is now Belgium December 13, 1809 and relocated to Detroit with his parents and siblings in 1833. His father Ange was a quartermaster in Napoleon's army who emigrated to the United States upon Napoleon's defeat. After moving to Detroit, Ange relocated to New Orleans with 3 sons and a daughter where he founded a manufacturing firm. Francis stayed in Detroit with his mother Jeanette and sister Mary Frances.

In 1836, Francis Palms married his first wife Martha Burnett, who died shortly after the birth of their son, Francis Frederick II. He married his second wife, Catherine Campau, daughter of Joseph Campau, who was a large landowner in early Detroit. With her he had two sons and a daughter. After working for Campau, Francis worked as a clerk and then tried manufacturing linseed oil. Selling this business, he became a partner in the wholesale grocery firm of Franklin Moore & Co. Palms made considerable capital as a grocer and purchased 40,000 acres Macomb and St. Clair Counties during the panic years of 1836-1837. Palms Road in St. Clair County was named for him. He had interest in a stave mill at the end of Palms Road on Anchor Bay.

Palms sold his land in lower Michigan in small parcels for a profit estimated to be between $300,000 and $400,000 and with the proceeds purchased pine and other forest lands in Michigan's Upper Peninsula and Wisconsin. He invested in the white pine areas near the Jump River in Wisconsin along with other successful businessmen including Ezra Cornell, Frederick Weyerhauser and Henry Sage, and in 1875, the men paid between $10 an acre up to $23.59. He also received land from a Pottawatomie chief, Chief Lerner, and continued to purchase more Indian Reserve lands as they became available. With these additions to his holdings, he became the largest landholder in Michigan (and possibly the U.S.) while in his late 20s.

When he would sell land, he would keep the mineral rights. The discovery of copper and coal increased his wealth and his net worth increased by $800,000. Some of the lands were subdivided and became established towns such as Seney, Michigan and Newberry, Michigan while others did not prosper, withered away and became ghost towns. In the 1880s Palms began building business blocks in Detroit. (The Francis Palms Building which houses The Fillmore Detroit theater in Detroit is named for him.) He was the president and largest stockholder in the Peoples Savings Bank as well as the Michigan Marine and Fire Insurance Company. He was the president of the Michigan Stove Company and part owner of the Galvin Brass & Iron Co., Union Iron Co., and the Vulcan Furnace & Peninsular Land Co. He was the vice president and a director of the Detroit, Mackinac and Marquette Railroad and he built the Palms Apartments & Palms House on E. Jefferson. He was also an early supporter of the Detroit Institute of Arts.

Between 1875 and 1885, his health declined when he suffered a paralytic stroke and heart disease. At the same time, he was struggling with his businesses as timber became scarce and taxes and the immigrant population increased, so he invited his son to the business in 1880. He died November 4, 1886, and was laid to rest in the Palms Mausoleum built by George D. Mason in the Mt. Elliott Cemetery in Detroit, leaving an estate of $7 million. After his death, his will was estimated at about $10,000,000, the largest estate in Michigan at the time.

His children Francis Frederick and Clotilde fought about the Palms estate, so that they were estranged for twenty years before coming to an agreement. Palms's legacy not only continued with his son but his grandsons, the Book Brothers and Charles L. Palms, co-founder of the Wayne Automobile Co. and part owner of the E-M-F Motor Co.

His remains are interred in the family mausoleum in Mount Elliott Cemetery.
