= John Addison Scott =

American submarine commander (1906–1986)

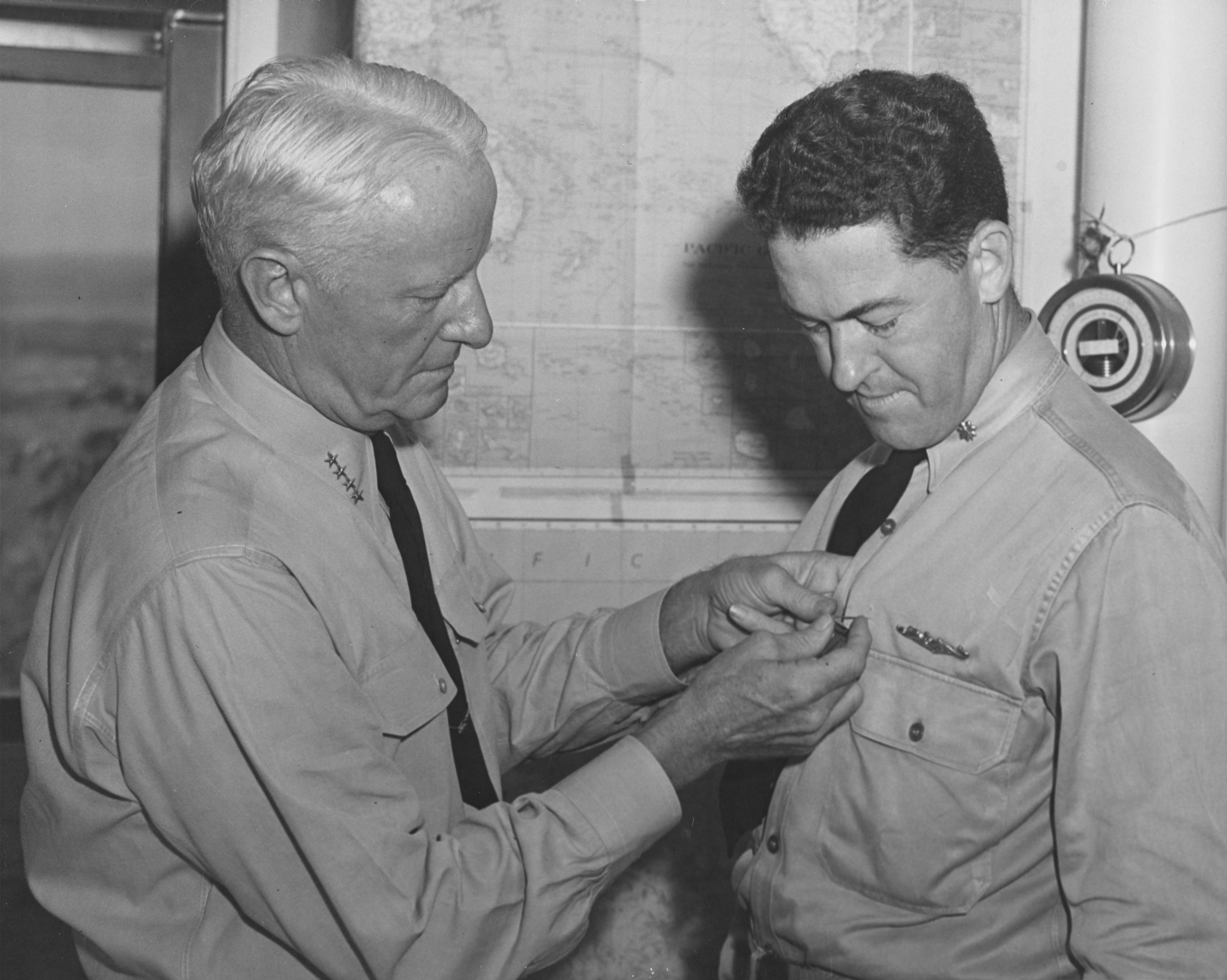
- Nimitz awarding Scott with the Navy Cross.
- Born: March 17, 1906; Lowell, Michigan
- Died: December 27, 1986 (aged 80); Sun City, Arizona
- Burial place: Arlington National Cemetery
- Education: United States Naval Academy
- Military career
- Allegiance: United States of America
- Branch: United States Navy
- Service years: 1928–1962
- Rank: Rear admiral
- Commands: USS Tunny (SS-282); Submarine Division 221; Submarine Division 41; USS Furse
- Conflicts: World War II
- Awards: Navy Cross

John Addison Scott (17 Mar 1906 – 27 Dec 1986), was a decorated submarine commander during World War II who reached the rank of rear admiral in the United States Navy.
