= Cobmoosa =

Native American leader

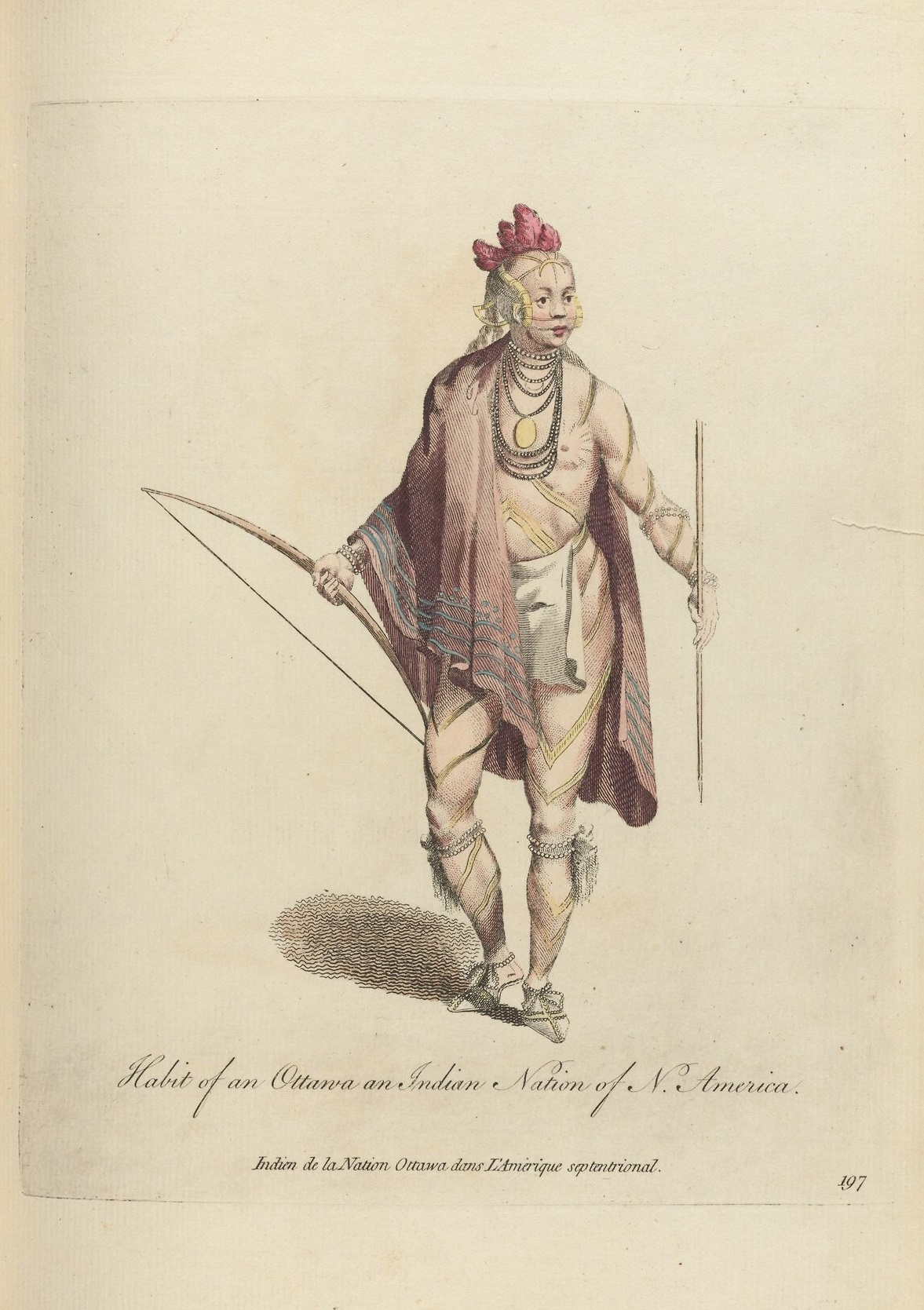
A 1772 engraving of a man of the Odawa (Ottawa) tribe.

Cobmoosa (c. 1768 - 1866), (Note: Everert states that Cobmoosa died a very old man in 1872. A news article from 2013 states that he died in 1866 at the age of 98.) or Weebmossa meaning "Great Walker", (Note: He was called Cobmossa by white people and Weebmoosa, his true native name, by others natives in the Grand River Valley. Frederic Baraga's dictionary of the Ojibwe writing systems defines "bemoosed" as "walker".) was an Odawa leader. He was a signatory of the 1855 treaty between the flat river band, and the federal government. Cobmoosa was the Ogema(chief) of the flat river band of Odawa indians. at the mouth of the Flat River at the present-day city of Lowell, Michigan until 1858.

From the mid-1830s, there was a wave of Euro-American people wanting to settle in Michigan. At that time, much of the land was the ancestral homeland of several Native American tribes. The federal government negotiated with the state's tribal leaders beginning in 1836, but were unable to secure a viable treaty to relocate them. Cobmoosa was one of 54 Odawa and Chippewa leaders involved in the successful negotiations of the 1855 Treaty of Detroit, where Odawa and Chippewa people stayed in Michigan, rather than relocating to Kansas as the government had negotiated with some, but not all, of the leaders in 1836. As a result of the 1855 treaty, Cobmoosa's tribe relocated from its ancestral lands to Elbridge Township in Oceana County, Michigan. There was compensation for the tribal chiefs and headmen, but most of the approximately $540,000 in cash and goods went to white "friends" involved in the negotiation process.

Cobmoosa lived 98 years and spent his last years in a log cabin that had been built by the government along Cobmoosa Lake. He was known for his eloquence and majestic walk and manner. The poem Cobmoosa's Lament was written in his memory, the town of Cobmoosa was named for him, and a stone monument was erected in his honor in Hart, Michigan.

== Early and family life ==
Cobmoosa was born in 1768 at a Rapids of Grand River village. He is believed to be the son of Antoine Campau and his wife, who was said to have been the daughter of an Odawa chief. Cobmoosa said of his father, a Frenchman from Montreal named Antoine, "At an early period of the Revolution my father espoused the cause of liberty with the Americans and remained firm to the end." He grew into a tall man, with "long strides."

He had four to six wives, three of whom were the daughters of his fellow leader Wabiwindego. Cobmoosa had three daughters: Ne-gance, Mrs. Cub-as-ka and Mrs. Ne-gak. His sons were Henry, Antoine, and James.

== Ojibwe chief ==
Flat River, a tributary of the Grand River. Cobmoosa's ancestral home was near the mouth of Flat River on land that is now Lowell, Michigan

Cobmoosa was well-respected among the natives of the Grand River Valley and was generally known for his eloquence and majestic presence. He lived in an Odawa village near the mouth of the Flat River, where the current town of Lowell, Michigan is located.

Cobmoosa was the second-in-command of the Flat River bands of Native Americans in 1833. That year, the village of Ionia was founded by 63 people from Eastern New York and needed a place to live while they built their log cabins. Cobmoosa's village moved about three miles away to another place along the river and the newcomers took over Cobmoosa's village after they bought the tribe's wigwams.

== Merchant ==
Cobmoosa operated a trading post at the mouth of the Flat River. Over time, he came to be known as a man of "sterling character" and "great dignity".

Cobmoosa moved into a house in Lowell, where he lived with his wife, Sophia. On Main Street, he operated a grocery store.

== Treaty of 1855 ==
More white settlers moved into the area over the next several years and there was pressure to make a treaty for Native American land. Cobmoosa was among those who went with 24 Ottawa and Chippewa leaders to Washington, D.C. to negotiate a treaty with the president. The federal government wanted the tribes to relinquish all land north of the Grand River. He attended the negotiations, but was not one of the signers of the treaty. The treaty of 1836 was not abided once the tribes learned that they were required to relocate to Kansas, which was a problem due to the distance and change in habitat. The treaty then was renegotiated for members of the Ottawa and Chippewa tribes to relocate to Oceana and Mason Counties in Michigan.

In 1855, Cobmoosa signed the Treaty of Detroit with the federal government which meant that his tribe would relocate to Oceana County, Michigan. The treaty was signed by 54 other leaders of Odawa and Chippewa tribes in Detroit. In exchange for their ancestral lands, roughly $540,000 in cash and goods were split among all of the represented tribes. (Note: The amount of the payment varies from 538,400 to $540,000.) It was to be paid out over 10 years. Much of it went to white friends, like Cobmoosa's uncle Louis Campau; $500 went to the chiefs and $100 to headmen. (Note: Both Louis and Antoine Campau were involved in treaty negotiations that made them a lot of money.) Cobmoosa's people relocated to Elbridge Township. The government built a log cabin for him in Cobmoosa, Michigan and he along with 1300 others were relocated by 1858. Reluctant to move to the reservation in Elbridge Township, Michigan, he waited until all of the tribe had relocated and stayed near the graves of his forefathers as long as he could. He did, though, make trips to Oceana County to be with members of his tribe.

I am an Indian; and can be nothing else. I wish my people and children to be civilized. I know your ways are superior to ours, and my people must adopt them or die. But I cannot change. The young can adopt new ways; the old cannot. I shall soon pass away, living and dying an Indian. You can bend the young tree, but not the old oak.

— Cobmoosa, as told to Mr. Campau

== Later years and death ==
Cobmoosa's cabin was located on 80 acres allotted to him in Oceana County along Cobmoosa Lake, about three miles west of the Cobmoosa post office. He lived at his cabin with one of this daughters and her husband, Joe Bailey. He also lived part of the time with another daughter Wassia and her husband Jerome Ne-gake, who had a farm across the lake from his cabin.

He died at 98 years of age in 1866 and was buried in Elbridge Township, Michigan on a knoll near his cabin. A monument was erected to Cobmoosa at the location of the initial schoolhouse that had been built by the government. The Daughters of the American Revolution's Ionia chapter had the monument created with the inscription: "Ottawa Indian Chief and Great Speaker of the Tribe. Born at the Rapids of the Grand River, 1768. Died on this reservation, 1866."

== Legacy ==
Cobmoosa's Lament was written in memory of the chief by Alden Jewell of Grand Rapids. It was published in an article by Lewis Bates in 1854 in the Grand Rapids Eagle. (Note: Cobmoosa's Lament was written about the chief and published in the Grand Rapids Eagle in 1854. COBMOOSA’S LAMENT. My step is the tread of a warrior no more; The days of my pride and my glory are o’er; No more shall I follow the foeman’s tracks; No more shall the war-chief welcome me back; My bow, my nerves, and my heart are unstrung; My death-song alone remains to be sung. The braves of my clan have sunk to their rest; Their children are gone to the north and the west; The forests have fallen, the land is sold; Our birthright is gone for the Christian’s gold, And manhood has passed from the Indian’s brow, Since he gave the soil to the white man’s plow. The lord of the forest is lord no more; The pride of his manly soul is o’er. The fields, where he won his youthful fame, On the track of the foe, or in quest of game, Are his no more. UNMANNED HE GOES To brood over the Indian’s doom and woes; His doom he sees in the towering halls, His doom he reads, as the forest falls, His doom he hears in the Sabbath chime, His doom he reads in the march of time; Will it shame thy heart, proud white man, say, To shed a tear as we pass away? As for me, I go not where my kindred have gone; By the grave of my father I’ll linger alone. The oak may be rent by the lightning of heaven; The storm-wind may bow it, its stem may be riven; But with trunk sere and blasted, and shorn of its bays, Still grasping the earth, it proudly decays. As a son of the forest I lived in my pride; As sons of the forest my forefathers died. ‘Till I go to the land where the bright waters shine, I’ll live by their graves, and their grave shall be mine; I linger not long, my nerves are unstrung, My death song is ready, it soon will be sung. — Alden Jewell) The "Cobmoosa Stone", a stone monument in his honor at Hart, Michigan, was dedicated by the Daughters of the American Revolution's Ionia chapter in 1927. He was recognized in part for his role in the Treaty of Detroit of 1855 that required the Odawa people to move to Mason and Oceana counties of Michigan.

A commemorative monument was erected at the Ionia Fairgrounds by the local chapter of the Daughters of the American Revolution in 1922. The plaque says that Cobmoosa's band lived in a seasonal village near the present town of Ionia.
