= Cobmoosa, Michigan =

Coordinates: 43.663°N 86.189°W

Cobmoosa was a location in Oceana County, Michigan. It was named for Cobmoosa, the Odawa leader who the federal government built a log cabin for here in 1858 during the relocation of the Odawa here from Ionia County, Michigan.

There was a store operated by Cook and Wessel, schools, and post office in Cobmoosa, but after a fire that brought down the post office in 1916, it was never replaced. A lake and the area continue to be called Cobmoosa. The site of the post office is not known; the lake, which was near Cobmoosa, is located west of Walkerville, Michigan. (Note: Cobmoosa lived at Lake Cobmoosa, which was reported to be 3 miles west of the post office.) The coordinates provided are for Cobmoosa Lake.
