= Joshua Wawanosh =

First Nations leader of Ojibwe descent

- Born: c. 1871
- Died: 1871 (aged 89–90)
- Other names: Kachkinnindji; Joshua Waywaynosh
- Occupation: Indian Chief
- Known for: negotiated the transfer of millions of acres of First Nations land to the British government

Chief Joshua Wawanosh was a First Nations leader of Ojibwe descent, who lived near the southern shore of Lake Huron. He was born near Lake Superior. One source says he had to leave the Lake Superior area after he killed someone.

Wawanosh was a leader during the War of 1812.

Both his father and grandfather had been hereditary Chiefs, before him. All four of his sons were Chiefs.

He served as Chief for three periods, 1827–1844, 1848–1853 and 1868–1870. He remained monolingual in the Ojibwe language his entire life.

He transferred over 2,200,000 acres (8,900 km^{2}) of First Nations land to the British government, in 1827. His responsibility for the transfer has been the subject of criticism.
