= Keewaycooshcum =

Leader of the Ottawa nation

Keewaycooshcum (literally "Long Nose") (d.1839), also spelled Keewacoosheum, Kewikishkum, or Kewaykishkum, was a leader of the Grand River Band of Ottawa Nation Native Americans at the Flat River in what would become the U.S. state of Michigan. In 1821, he defied his tribe and signed the Treaty of Chicago, ceding all Ottawa territory south of the Grand River to the United States. After signing the treaty, Keewaycooshcum was exiled by his band north to the Manistee River. Over the following decades, he and his family were murdered for his role in the treaty.

Keewaycooshcum was described by one contemporary as: "about middle stature, [with] a face of the sternest aspect marked with a more than usual degree of savage Gloom, with a very compact though active figure. His features were much scarred with wounds. He was decidedly the noblest Roman . . . in his bearing, form & countenance."

== Treaty of Chicago ==
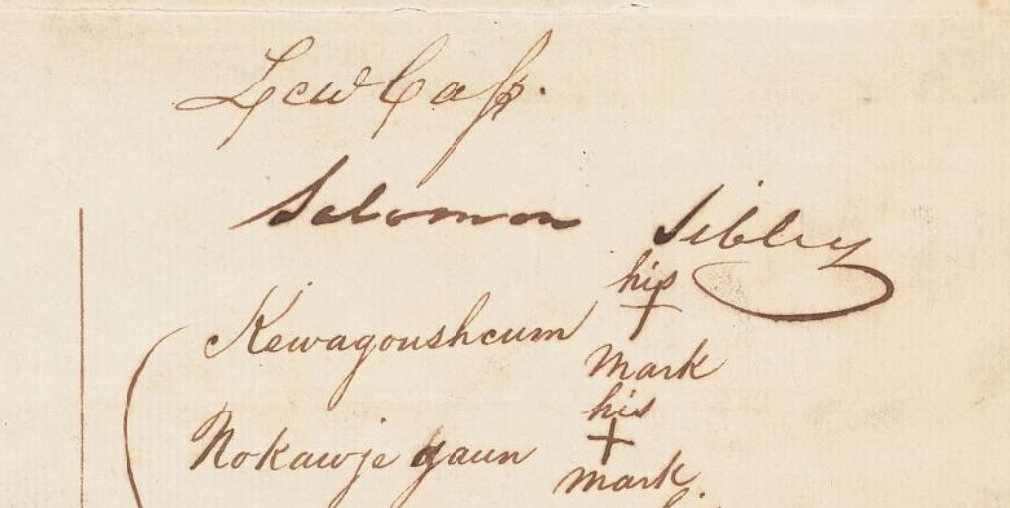
Keewaycooshcum's mark on the 1821 Treaty of Chicago (using spelling "Kewagoushcum"), which resulted in his exile.

In 1821, Keewaycooshcum and other Grand River Ottawa leaders met with representatives of the United States in Chicago to negotiate the sale of tribal lands south of the Grand River in present-day central Michigan. While the majority of the Grand River Ottawa opposed selling tribal lands to the United States, Keewaycooshcum was persuaded to agree to a sale by Lewis Cass, the future Governor of the Michigan Territory with whom Keewaycooshcum was close friends.

== Exile to Manistee ==
Keewaycooshcum's agreement to the terms of the 1821 treaty substantially hurt his prestige with the Grand River Ottawa. While he had been among the most powerful Ottawa leaders prior to the treaty, by 1835, he had been exiled from the Flat River to the Manistee River far to the north, the furthest possible outlands of Grand River society. When the Grand River Ottawa signed a second treaty with the United States in 1836, Keewaycooshcum was singled out with the diminutive title "former head chief," and designated as a "2nd Class" leader.

== Death ==
In the decades following the treaty, disaffected members of the Grand River Ottawa reportedly poisoned several of his close family members. In 1839, Keewaycooshcum himself was murdered.
