= G. Mott Williams =

American bishop (1857–1923)

The Right Reverend Gershom Mott Williams
- Bishop of Marquette
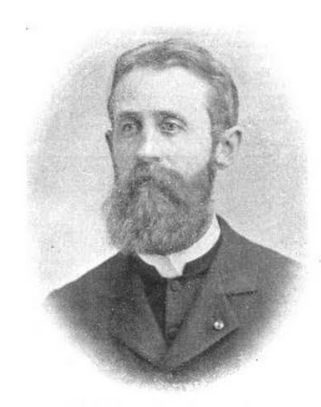
- Church: Episcopal Church
- Diocese: Marquette
- Elected: November 14, 1895
- In office: 1896–1919
- Successor: Robert L. Harris
- Other post: Suffragan Bishop in charge of Europe

Orders
- Ordination: June 29, 1882 by Samuel Smith Harris
- Consecration: May 1, 1896 by Daniel S. Tuttle

Personal details
- Born: February 11, 1857 Fort Hamilton, New York, U.S.
- Died: April 14, 1923 (aged 66) Paris, France
- Buried: Elmwood Cemetery, Detroit
- Denomination: Anglican
- Parents: Thomas R. Williams, Mary Neosho Bailey
- Spouse: Eliza Bradish Biddle (m. 1879)
- Children: 7
- Education: Cornell University

Gershom Mott Williams (February 11, 1857 – April 14, 1923) was an American bishop. He was the first Episcopalian bishop of Marquette. He was a church journalist, author, and translator. Williams graduated from Cornell University and received his master's degree and Doctor of Divinity degree from Hobart College. Although he passed the bar in 1879, Williams began an extensive career in the Episcopal Church, having positions in Buffalo, Milwaukee, and Detroit before becoming a bishop. He was involved in many church commissions, including the preparation of and attendance at the Lambeth Conference of 1908.

Williams was the grandson of John R. Williams, the first mayor of Detroit and a delegate to the convention by which Michigan acceded to the Constitution of the United States. His father, Thomas Williams, served as a Civil War general and died in the Battle of Baton Rouge (1862). Williams himself was a member of the Sons of the American Revolution and member of the Military Order of the Loyal Legion, and served for four years as the chaplain to the state militia of Michigan.

== Early life ==
Williams was born on February 11, 1857, in Fort Hamilton in Brooklyn, New York. He was the son of Civil War general Thomas Williams and Mary Neosho Williams. His father died at the Battle of Baton Rouge in 1862. Mott published his father's personal papers. His grandfather was John R. Williams, the first mayor of the city. Williams' great-grandfather, Thomas Williams, settled in Detroit in 1765 and the Williams family remained there from that time. Prior to Detroit, the Williams family had settled in Albany, New York in 1690. His paternal ancestors were Roman Catholics who at some point joined the Episcopal Church. His mother was the daughter of Joseph Bailey, who served in the U.S. Army. Her Dutch ancestors were from the Hudson River Valley area and New England. Williams was a member of the Sons of the American Revolution.

He had a brother, John R. Williams, and sister, Mary Josepha Williams. Josepha was a physician and like her mother, Mary Neosho Williams, a significant landowner in Evergreen, Colorado. Josepha was married in 1896 to Canon Charles Winfred Douglas,

Following his father's death in 1862, Williams lived in Newburgh, New York, where he was confirmed by the Rt. Rev. Horatio Potter.

== Education ==
He attended private and public schools before attending and in 1871 graduation from the Newburgh Academy Williams had jobs as a timekeeper and bookkeeper before winning a two-year scholarship to Cornell University. During that time, from December 1874 to the spring of 1875, he traveled through Europe. He graduated from Cornell University in 1877. Williams received a Master's Degree in 1889 and a Doctor of Divinity in 1895 from Hobart College. He moved to Detroit in 1877 to work in a law office and settle his father's estate.

== Career ==
=== Religious ===
On December 29, 1879, Williams was admitted to the bar in Michigan. He was ordained a deacon by Bishop Harris on December 26, 1880, and served at St. John's in Detroit. He was ordained priest on June 29, 1882, in St Paul's Church in Detroit. Then, until 1884, he was rector at the Church of the Messiah. After that, he continued to serve as a rector at St. George's until 1889. During this time he was a church journalist and in charge of the African-American church, St. Matthew's. He had positions at St. Paul's in Buffalo and All Saint's in Milwaukee before becoming administrator and archdeacon in the Episcopal Diocese of Northern Michigan in 1891. Williams was elected first bishop of Marquette on November 14, 1895, and consecrated May 1, 1896.

He was on the commission appointed by the Archbishop of Canterbury in pursuance of resolution 74 of the Lambeth Conference of 1908 on the relation of the Anglican Communion to the Church of Sweden. Williams traveled to Sweden in 1920 in advance of the Lambeth Conference to ascertain Scandinavian Church relations

Williams was deputy of the General Conventions twice. He sat on the commission and was Bishop-in-Charge of the American Churches in Europe, officiating at the service dedicating the Church of the Holy Trinity in Paris as the Episcopal cathedral in Europe in 1923. He also sat on commissions to revise the hymnal and to create a Swedish version of the Prayer Book. Williams translated the Common Prayer Book from English to Swedish.

Williams resigned October 1919 due to a long-standing illness.

=== Military and political ===
Williams played a key role in Michigan's statehood as the president of the Constitutional Convention of Assent. Williams organized and was the state's first Major-General of the Michigan state troops. He was chaplain to the Fourth Regiment (Detroit) of the Michigan state troops for four years, beginning December 18, 1883. He was a member of the Military Order of the Loyal Legion.

== Personal life and death ==
Williams married Eliza (Lily) Biddle of Detroit in 1879. She descended from the Biddle family of Philadelphia. Her father was William S. Biddle of Grosse Ile, Michigan, and she was granddaughter of John Biddle, an early mayor of Detroit and Congressman. Her mother was Susan D. Ogden and her maternal grandfather was Judge Elias B. D. Ogden of the Supreme Court of New Jersey. Lily was sister to Dr. Andrew P. Biddle, General John Biddle, and First Lieutenant William S. Biddle Jr.

The couple had seven children: Susan, Thomas Victor, Dayton Ogden, Cecil, Rhoda, John, and Mary Josepha Williams. He died April 14, 1923, in Paris, France.

== Publications ==
- Gershom Mott Williams (1888). Between Two Christmas Days. Detroit, Michigan: Press of American Church Times and Michigan Churchman. LCCN 31030167.
- Gershom Mott Williams (1910). The Church of Sweden and the Anglican Communion. The Young Churchman Co.
- Gershom Mott (1910). Svensk-Engelska kyrkokonferensen i Uppsala (translation of the Book of Common Prayer) (in Swedish).
- Gershom Mott Williams (1913). Human Questions and Divine Answers: Short sermons expressly written for lay readers in the American church. Milwaukee, Minnesota: The Young Churchman Company.
- Gershom Mott Williams (1916). Swedish and American Church Life: A Tract for Swedes.
