= Josepha Williams Douglas =

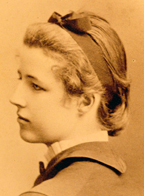
Dr. Josepha Williams Douglas, affectionately called "Dr. Jo", was a Denver physician and co-owner and operator of Marquette-Williams Sanitarium

Josepha Williams Douglas (1860–1938), also commonly known as Josepha Williams, was a physician and co-operator of the Marquette-Williams Sanitarium in Denver, Colorado. She was one of the first female doctors in the state. She, as well as her mother Mary Neosho Williams, purchased a number of tracts of land in the Evergreen, Colorado area, at least some of which were ultimately donated for the Evergreen Conference District. Douglas was the daughter of Civil War General Thomas Williams and wife of Canon Charles Winfred Douglas, a plainsong musical expert and Episcopalian priest.

== Early life ==
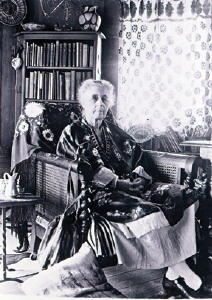
Mary Neosho Williams (d. 1914), widow of Civil War General Thomas Williams, and later instrumental in the development of the Evergreen Conference District, after having established "Camp Neosho" and what would become the Hiwan Homestead Museum.

Douglas was born Mary Josepha Williams in Virginia, the daughter of Civil War General Thomas Williams and Mary Neosho Bailey Williams. Her parents were a wealthy family from Detroit, Michigan. Her brothers were John R. Williams and Gershom Mott Williams, the first bishop of the Episcopal Diocese of Marquette who later published General Williams' personal papers.

Douglas was a member of the Daughters of the American Revolution; she was the great-granddaughter of Captain Gershom Mott who was a commander at New Windsor and Fort Constitution during the Revolutionary War.

== Education ==
Douglas, under the name Josepha Williams, graduated in 1889 from the Gross Medical College, which was rolled into the University of Colorado Denver School of Medicine in 1911.

== Career ==
After obtaining her M.D., Douglas practiced medicine in Denver beginning in 1889. She was among the state's first female physicians.

Douglas and Dr. Madeline Marquette founded the Marquette-Williams Sanitarium, a medical and surgical center, at 1542 Pearl Street in Denver in 1891. In 1892 they established a nursing school in conjunction with the sanitarium. Douglas was superintendent of the sanitarium.

Douglas became a member of the Colorado Medical Society in 1894.

== Evergreen ==
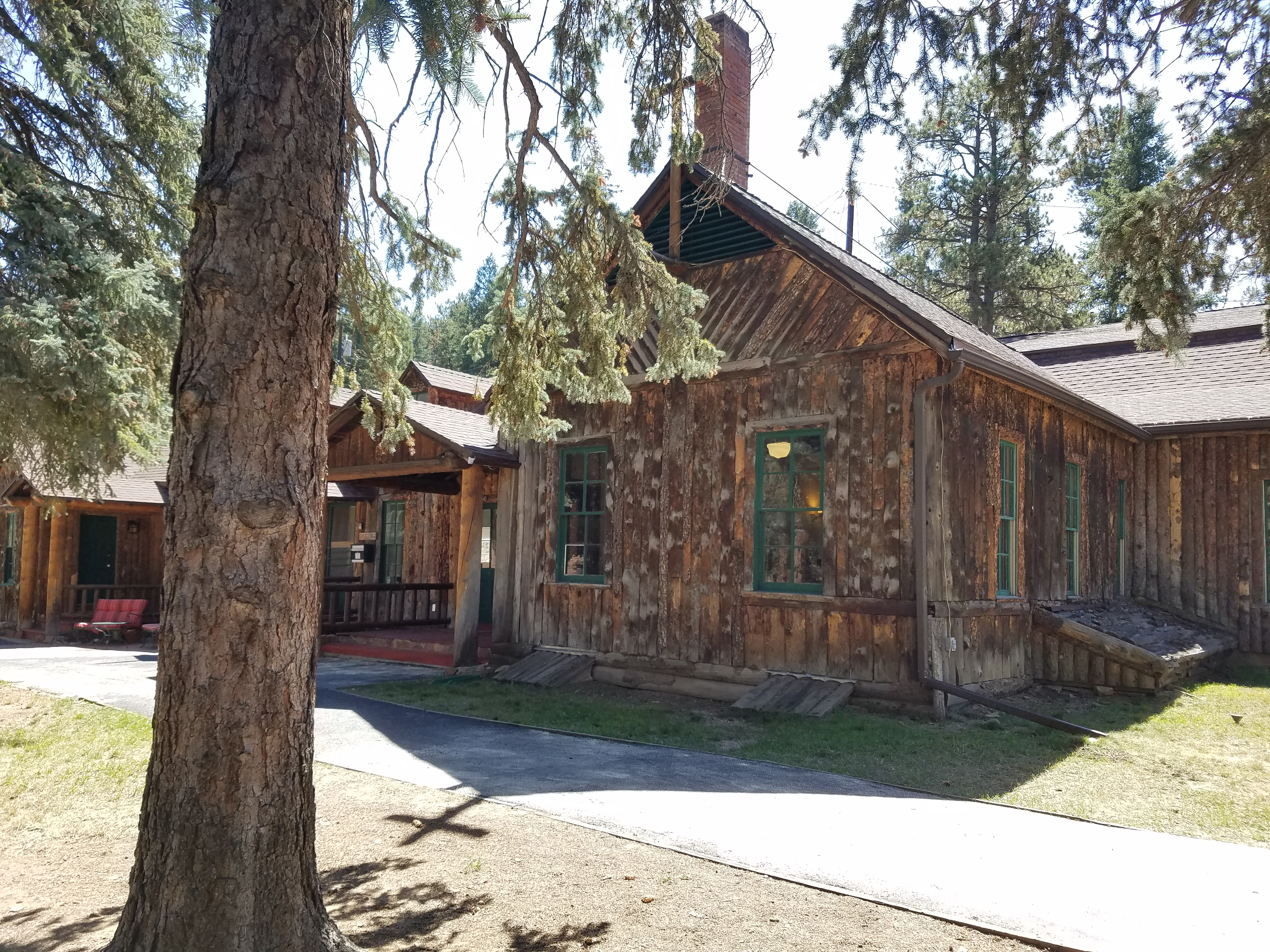
St. John's Episcopal Church in the Evergreen Conference District

Douglas purchased several hundred acres of land in Evergreen in 1893 near the cabin of her maternal uncle, Dr. Thomas Bailey. She had a one-room cabin with a "massive" stone fireplace built for her by John Spence from a partially finished barn. After the cabin was constructed, Douglas and her mother commissioned Spence to build a large addition that included a two-story tower with a servant's kitchen, library, second-story bedroom, and several porches. After Mary Williams death in 1914, it was further expanded upon by Douglas and her husband. It ultimately grew through Spence's efforts to a 17-room lodge with vaulted ceilings, two octagonal towers and a private chapel used by Canon Charles Winfield Douglas. (Note: Noel states that Mary Neosho Williams began construction of the lodge in 1887, but Shellenbarger states that Josepha purchased the property in 1893 and that the construction of the lodge began with a one-room cabin that she had built by John Spence. Noel also states that Dr. Douglas received the lodge upon her mother's death.)

The summer retreat called Camp Neosho also had a number of tents were installed with wood-burning stoves, platform floors made of wood, and double canvas walls by Mary Williams. Visitors included Williams' siblings and their families. The lodge is now the Hiwan Homestead Museum.

Williams began holding Episcopal church services in tents in 1893. She purchased Stewart Hotel, which was transformed into St. Mark's in the Wilderness church, later Mission of the Transfiguration. Douglas also purchased land around the Evergreen area and received the former Stewart Hotel through her mother's will. Land and buildings were donated for the creation of the Evergreen Conference District.

== Personal life ==
The Mission of the Holy Redeemer was established in 1893 in a vacated church building at Lawrence and 10th Street, with the authorization of Bishop John F. Spalding of Cathedral of St. John in the Wilderness. The new congregation included African-American Episcopalians and White Anglo-Catholics. Douglas, her mother and church clergy and leaders met with African-American leaders from Kansas City, Kansas and people who moved to Denver from Memphis, Tennessee. In January 1894, its first church services were conducted.

Douglas sailed for Europe in January 1896 for a four-month vacation in Genoa, Italy with Dr. Marquette Baker.

Dr. Douglas married Canon Charles Winfred Douglas at the Cathedral of St. John in the Wilderness on July 22, 1896. In 1894, Canon Charles Winfred Douglas had moved to Evergreen from New York to recuperate from pneumonia and tuberculosis and subsequently was under the care of Dr. Douglas.

The couple moved to Evergreen after they had married. Canon Douglas began attending Evergreen's summer retreats and music camps in 1897. He led musical events, which increased the popularity of the center. Douglas was priest of the retreat's church, the Mission of the Transfiguration, for more than 40 years.

Their son, Frederic Huntington Douglas was born in Evergreen in 1897. He was later a Native Arts curator at the Denver Art Museum.

The family moved to New York in 1902 while Canon Douglas pursued in musical and religious career, having the previous year studied plainsong and Gregorian chants in England, France, Germany, and Scotland. He became ill again in 1903 and stayed in a number of eastern convalescent centers before traveling to New Mexico for a six-month stay. In 1918, he edited the New Hymnal of the Episcopal church and in 1940 helped create The Hymnal of 1940.

Dr. Douglas died on March 9, 1938 in Evergreen after a long illness. Canon Douglas married Anne Woodward in 1940, with whom he worked with on The Hymnal of 1940, and died on January 28, 1944.

== See also ==
- Denver public health advocates
  - Dr. Frederick J. Bancroft, 19th century Colorado public health advocate
  - Frances Wisebart Jacobs, advocate for tuberculosis healthcare and founder of Denver's Jewish Hospital
- Williams family
  - John R. Williams, first mayor of Detroit and her grandfather
  - Thomas Williams (pioneer), early settler to Detroit and her great-grandfather
