= Everhardt Ranch =

- U.S. National Register of Historic Places
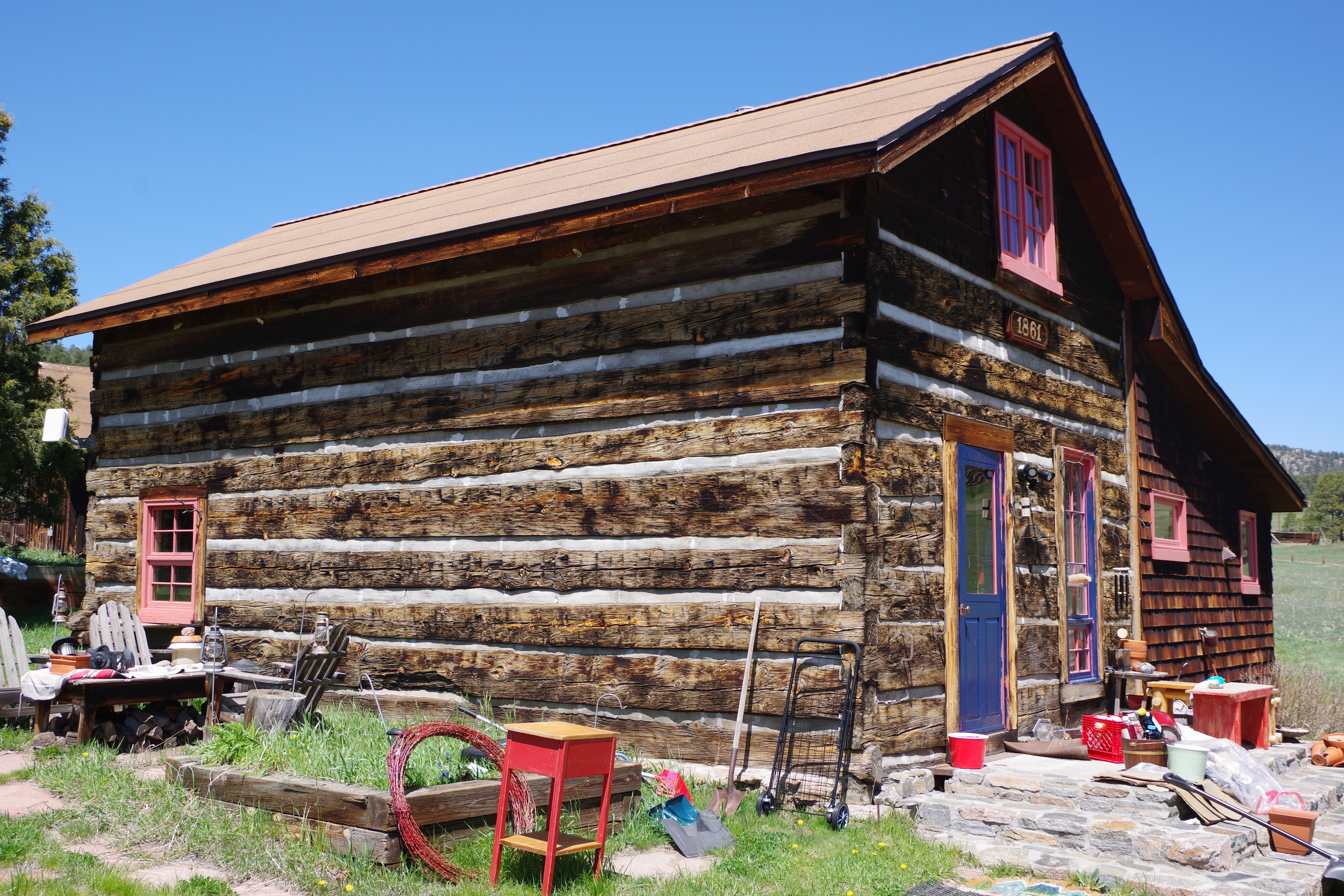

- Location within Colorado
- Nearest city: Evergreen, Colorado
- Coordinates: 39°36′06″N 105°16′31″W
- Area: 10 acres (4.0 ha)
- Built: 1867
- Built by: Everhardt, Johnny
- NRHP reference No.: 80000903
- Added to NRHP: May 7, 1980

The Everhardt Ranch, located in southeast of Evergreen, Colorado, dates from 1867. A portion of the ranch with three of its historic buildings was listed on the National Register of Historic Places in 1980.

It was deemed "significant for its associations with Johnny Everhardt and Gus and Marie Herzman, pioneer settlers in the Evergreen area, and for its architectural features which reflect the characteristic features of an early Colorado mountain ranch."

It is located about .25 miles (0.40 km) southeast of the junction of Lone Peak Drive and North Mountain Park Rd., northeast of Evergreen Highlands and west of High Dr., about 4 miles (6.4 km) southeast of Evergreen.

Its nomination was written in cooperation with Hiwan Homestead Museum.
