= Thomas Williams (Union general) =

American general (1815–1862)

Thomas R. Williams
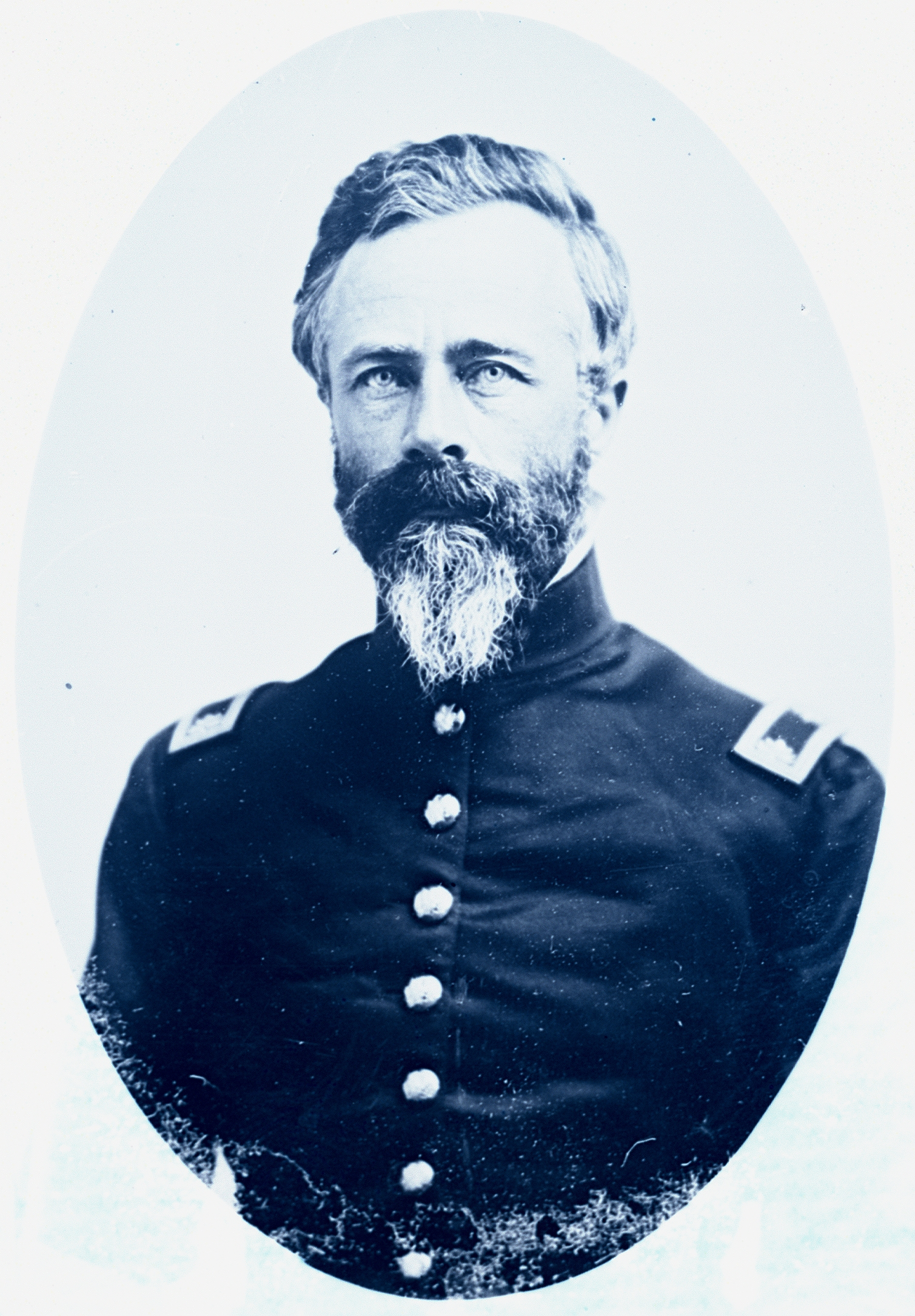
- Civil War General Thomas Williams (1815–1862) who died in the Battle of Baton Rouge
- Born: January 16, 1815; Albany, New York, US
- Died: August 5, 1862 (aged 47); Baton Rouge, Louisiana, US
- Burial place: Elmwood Cemetery Detroit, Michigan
- Military career
- Allegiance: United States; Union
- Branch: United States Army; Union Army
- Service years: 1832, 1837–1862
- Rank: Brigadier General
- Unit: Department of the Gulf
- Commands: Williams' Brigade
- Conflicts: Black Hawk War; Second Seminole War; Mexican War; American Civil War: Occupation of New Orleans; Battle of Baton Rouge †
- Other work: career soldier

Thomas R. Williams (January 16, 1815 – August 5, 1862) was an American antebellum-era Army officer and a brigadier general in the Union Army during the Civil War. He was killed as he commanded the Union troops at the Battle of Baton Rouge.

== Birth and early years ==
Williams was born in 1815 in Albany, New York. His father was General John R. Williams, the first Mayor of Detroit and prominent military figure in Michigan. His father married his cousin, Mary Mott, of one of Albany's leading families. Williams was the fifth of nine surviving children.

Williams' grandfather, Thomas Williams, settled in Detroit in 1765 and the Williams family remained there from that time. Prior to Detroit, the Williams family had settled in Albany, New York in 1690.

== Military career ==
He began his military service in 1832 as a private in an infantry company during the Black Hawk War, serving as a trumpeter under his father's command.

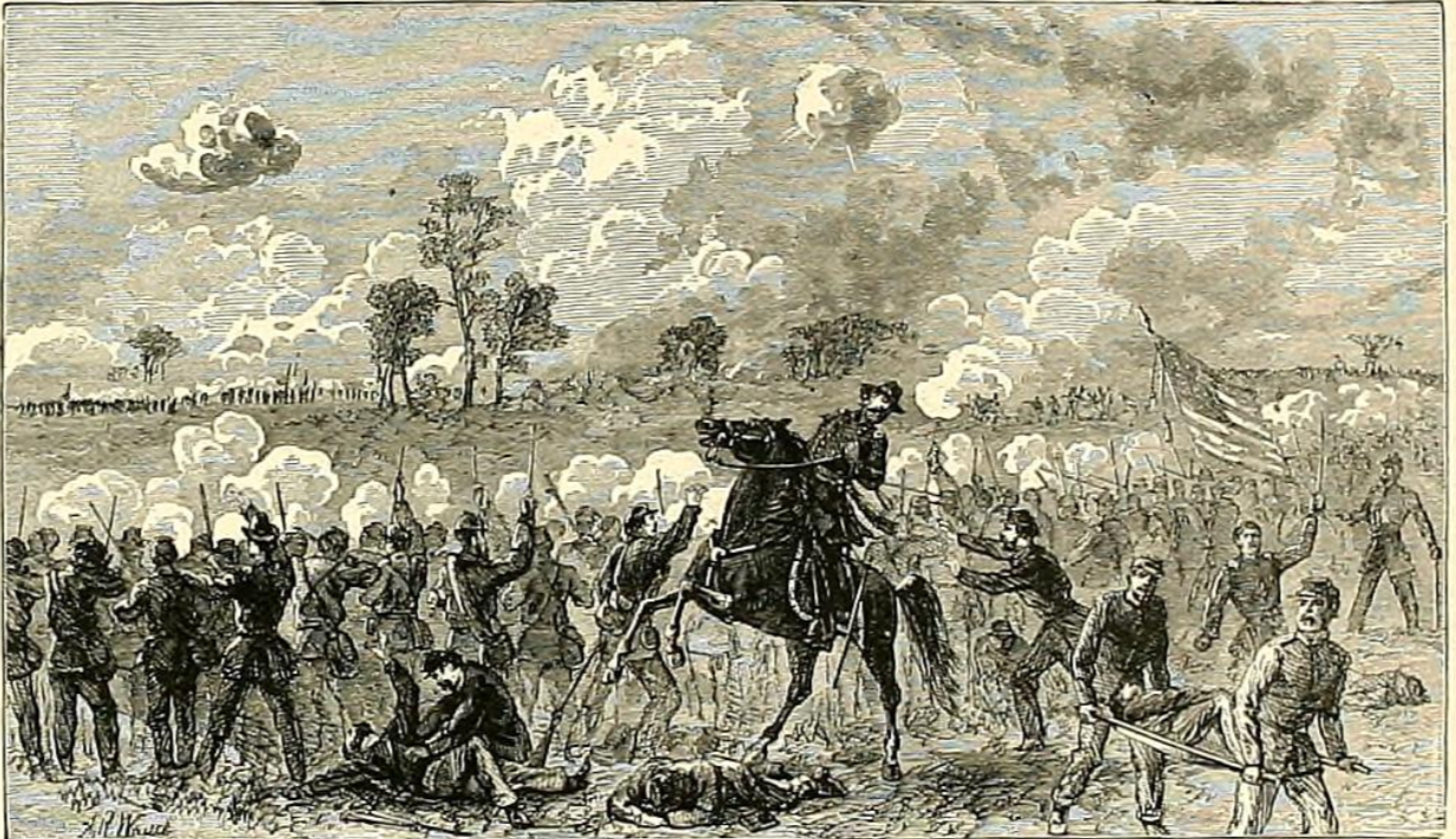
Death of General Thomas during fighting in Baton Rouge

The following year, Williams received an appointment to attend the United States Military Academy, then graduated in the Class of 1837 and he also taught mathematics at West Point in 1844. He was breveted as a second lieutenant of the 4th U. S. Artillery. He later served in the Seminole Wars as a first Lieutenant and Assistant Commissary of Substance. Williams served in the Mexican War and was brevetted as a captain on August 20, 1847. He was brevetted as a major on September 13, 1847, for "meritorious service" in the war.

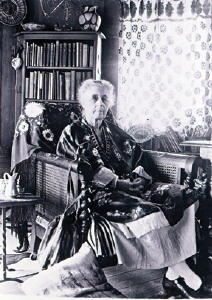
Mary Neosho Williams (d. 1914), widow of Civil War General Thomas Williams, and later instrumental in the development of the Evergreen Conference District, after having established "Camp Neosho" and what would become the Hiwan Homestead Museum.

Following the Mexican War, in 1852 Williams was promoted to full captain and posted to Fort Mackinac on Mackinac Island, Michigan, where he met and married Mary Neosho Bailey, the daughter of Dr. Joseph Hayward Bailey, who served as a Surgeon in the U.S. Army. Her Dutch ancestors were from the Hudson River Valley area and New England. Williams would serve as the commander of Fort Mackinac with the 4th Regiment of Artillery from 1852 to 1856.

Williams was later assigned to posts in Florida and the Utah Territory. By the late 1850s, he was serving as an instructor at the Artillery School at Fort Monroe in Virginia.

== Civil War and death ==
Shortly after the Civil War began, Williams was promoted to major in the 5th U. S. Artillery on May 14, 1861. On September 28, 1861, President Abraham Lincoln promoted Williams to Brigadier General of U. S. Volunteers, to rank from that date and on February 3, 1862, the U.S. Senate confirmed his nomination. He was posted to the command of a brigade on the Potomac River, and was later posted to Fort Hatteras, North Carolina. He then was assigned to Maj. Gen. Benjamin Butler's command in the land operations against New Orleans, Louisiana. Williams and his brigade were assigned the task of occupying Baton Rouge. On May 29, General Williams arrived in the city with six regiments of infantry, two artillery batteries, and a troop of cavalry.

During the early summer, Williams' 3,000-man infantry brigade began work on what later became known as Grant's Canal, cutting a new channel across the base of De Soto Point on the west side of the Mississippi River across from Vicksburg, Mississippi. The purpose of the canal was to develop a channel for navigation that would enable gunboats and transports to bypass the Confederate batteries at Vicksburg.

In August 1862, Confederate forces under the command of General John C. Breckinridge attacked the Union defenses of Baton Rouge in an effort to retake the state's capital. In the resulting engagement, the Battle of Baton Rouge, Williams was killed by a gunshot wound to his chest on August 5, 1862, while leading what proved to be the successful defense of the city. It was rumored that it was friendly fire.

Williams's body was aboard the transport steamer Whiteman or Lewis Whitman (sources differ) along with other dead and wounded from the Battle of Baton Rouge when the steamer sank in the Mississippi River near Donaldsonville, Louisiana, with the loss of all hands after colliding with the United States Navy sloop-of-war USS Oneida on August 7, 1862.

A bronze memorial plaque was dedicated to Williams on August 12, 1907, at Fort Mackinac, with the dedication led by the Bishop of Michigan, Charles David Williams. The plaque, located at the top of the ramp near the entrance by the South Sally Port, reads: “In Memory of General Thomas Williams, Commandant of Fort Mackinac, 1852-1856, Killed in Battle, August 5, 1862.”

== Personal life ==
Williams had two sons, John R. Williams and Gershom Mott Williams, and a daughter named Mary Josepha Williams. Gershom was the first bishop of the Episcopal Diocese of Marquette and he published General Williams' personal papers. Josepha, was a physician and like her mother, Mary Neosho Williams, a significant landowner in Evergreen, Colorado. She and Dr. Madeline Marquette founded the Marquette-Williams Sanitarium, a medical and surgical center, in Denver, Colorado in 1888. In 1892, they established a nursing school in conjunction with the sanitarium. Josepha was married in 1896 to Canon Charles Winfred Douglas, an Episcopalian priest and expert in plainsong music.

== See also ==
- List of American Civil War generals (Union)
