= Frederic Huntington Douglas =

American scholar (1897–1956)

Frederic Huntington Douglas (October 29, 1897, in Evergreen, Colorado – April 23, 1956) also known as Eric Douglas. "was one of the first scholars to recognize the artistic achievements of American Indians as well as the arts of Africa and Oceania."

== Early life ==
Douglas was the son of Charles Winfred Douglas (1867–1944), a canon in the Episcopal Church, and Josepha Williams Douglas (1860–1938), one of the first female doctors in the state of Colorado. Douglas spent his early years at his family's home in Evergreen, CO, which later became the Hiwan Homestead Museum. He had two children with wife Freda: Ann Pauline Maher (1928–1988), David Douglas (1932–1999), and Eve (Mrs. Wallace Jolivette).

== Education ==
He received a Bachelor of Arts degree in 1921 from the University of Colorado and from 1921 to 1926 studied Fine Arts at the University of Michigan and the Pennsylvania Academy of Fine Arts. Douglas married Freda Bendix Gillespie (1902–1979) in 1926.

From 1926 to 1929, Douglas was primarily a painter and wood carver. He and his wife, Freda, went on a trip around the world in 1928. This trip helped to develop a lifelong love of world arts, especially Japanese prints, Balinese wood carvings, and Asian textiles. Douglas collected broadly in this areas, as well as American textiles and American Indian arts.

Douglas received an honorary Doctor of Science from the University of Colorado in June 1948 and the University of Colorado Recognition Metal in 1956.

== Career ==
Douglas was hired as curator of [American] Indian Art at the Denver Art Museum in 1929 and was preceded by Edgar C. McMechan who was the first curator of Indian Art at DAM beginning in 1925. He served as director of the Denver Art Museum from 1940 to 1942. From 1942 to 1947 he held the title of Curator of Indian Arts at DAM. He served as curator of Native Arts at the Denver Art Museum from 1947 until April 23, 1956. During this time he was joined by assistant curator, Kate Peck Kent, who went on to become "professor emerita of anthropology at the University of Denver, a research associate at the Museum of International Folk Art in Santa Fe, New Mexico, and a resident scholar at the School of American Research."

Douglas created the Indian Leaflet series in 1930 which provided "summary accounts of culture areas and specific tribes alternated with comparative discussions of artifact types." He also established "Indian Fashion Shows" (or Indian Style Shows) that used clothing from the Denver Art Museum's American Indian collection that were modeled by "society ladies and Native Americans." He presented this fashion show over 100 times across the country.

He served as a Commissioner of the Indian Arts and Crafts Board (Federal Arts and Crafts Board) and as a trustee of a number of museums.

Frederic Douglas, along with Rene d'Harnoncourt and Henry Clumb, was involved in the Indian Court, Federal Building, at the 1939 Golden Gate International Exposition during the World's Fair in San Francisco. He served as a commissioner of the Indian Arts and Crafts Board (Federal Arts and Crafts Board) and as a trustee of "various museums." Douglas was enlisted by Rene d'Harnoncourt to design the Indian Art of the United States exhibition at the Museum of Modern Art in New York, which opened in 1941 and included a major catalog written by Douglas and d'Harnoncourt. A joint statement by Douglas and d'Harnoncourt clearly articulates their position on invention, innovation, and adaptation of arts. They wrote: "There are people who have created for themselves a romantic picture of a glorious past that is often far from accurate. They wish to see the living Indian return to an age that has long since passed and they resent any change to his art. But these people forget that any culture that is satisfied to copy the life of former generations has given up hope as well as life itself. The fact that we think of Navajo silversmithing as a typical Indian art and of the horsemanship of the Plains tribes as a typical Indian characteristic proves sufficiently that those tribes were strong enough to make such foreign contributions entirely their own by adapting them to the pattern of their own traditions. Why should it be wrong for the Indian people of today to do what they have done with great success in the past? Invention or adaptation of new forms does not necessarily mean repudiation of tradition but is often a source of its enrichment."

Douglas was contracted to reorganize the exhibitions and collections at the Peabody Museum, Harvard University c. 1950. He also regularly lectured at Harvard University, the University of Colorado, and the University of Denver.

"With tremendous courage Eric continued his work despite the amputation of his left arm, intolerable pain, and the knowledge of imminent death from cancer. "Only two months before his death he went to Berkeley [California] to serve as a consultant in the planning of the building and the exhibitions for the University of California Anthropological Museum."

"In 1956, he was named honorary Curator of the American Indian section" of Nelson Rockefeller's Museum of Primitive Art (now part of the Metropolitan Museum of Art in New York).

A book of ledger art drawings by a Cheyenne artist collected about 1865 known as the Frederic Douglas Ledger was once owned by Douglas. Pages from this book are now in the collection of the Hood Museum of Art, Dartmouth College, Hanover, New Hampshire and the University of Iowa Museum of Art.

== Military service ==
Douglas spent a brief time during 1918 as a private in the Infantry. He served in the Army Medical Corps from 1942 to 1944 in the Pacific Islands where he "expanded his interested to include the collecting of Oceanic Arts". He served as a captain and later a major in the New Hebrides and the Philippines, Luzon during World War II. At the time of his discharge Douglas was the rank of lieutenant colonel. "As registrar of the 31st General Hospital Unit he was the commanding officer of 130 nurses."

== Publications ==
Douglas's publications include: Indian Art of the United States (1941), the Denver Art Museum's "Leaflet Series", its "Material Culture Notes" (1939–1969). and Salome: a poem

== Legacy ==
Douglas left much of his collections to the Denver Art Museum, including many of his rare books and books on American Indian and anthropological topics. Douglas also had an extensive collection of books on sex and those were donated to the Institute For Sex Research at Indiana University. Select dictionaries and philology books were donated to the Denver Public Library.

"Following his death in 1956, he was then succeeded as curator of the department of native art by Royal Hassrick, Norman Feder, Richard (Dick) Conn, Nancy Blomberg and, at present, John P. Lukavic, the Andrew W. Mellon Foundation Curator of Native Arts."

"In 1974 the Douglas Society, now Friends of Native Arts: The Douglas Society, was founded to honor and ensure the continuance of the work of Frederic Douglas."
