= Elk Meadow Park =

Park in Colorado, United States

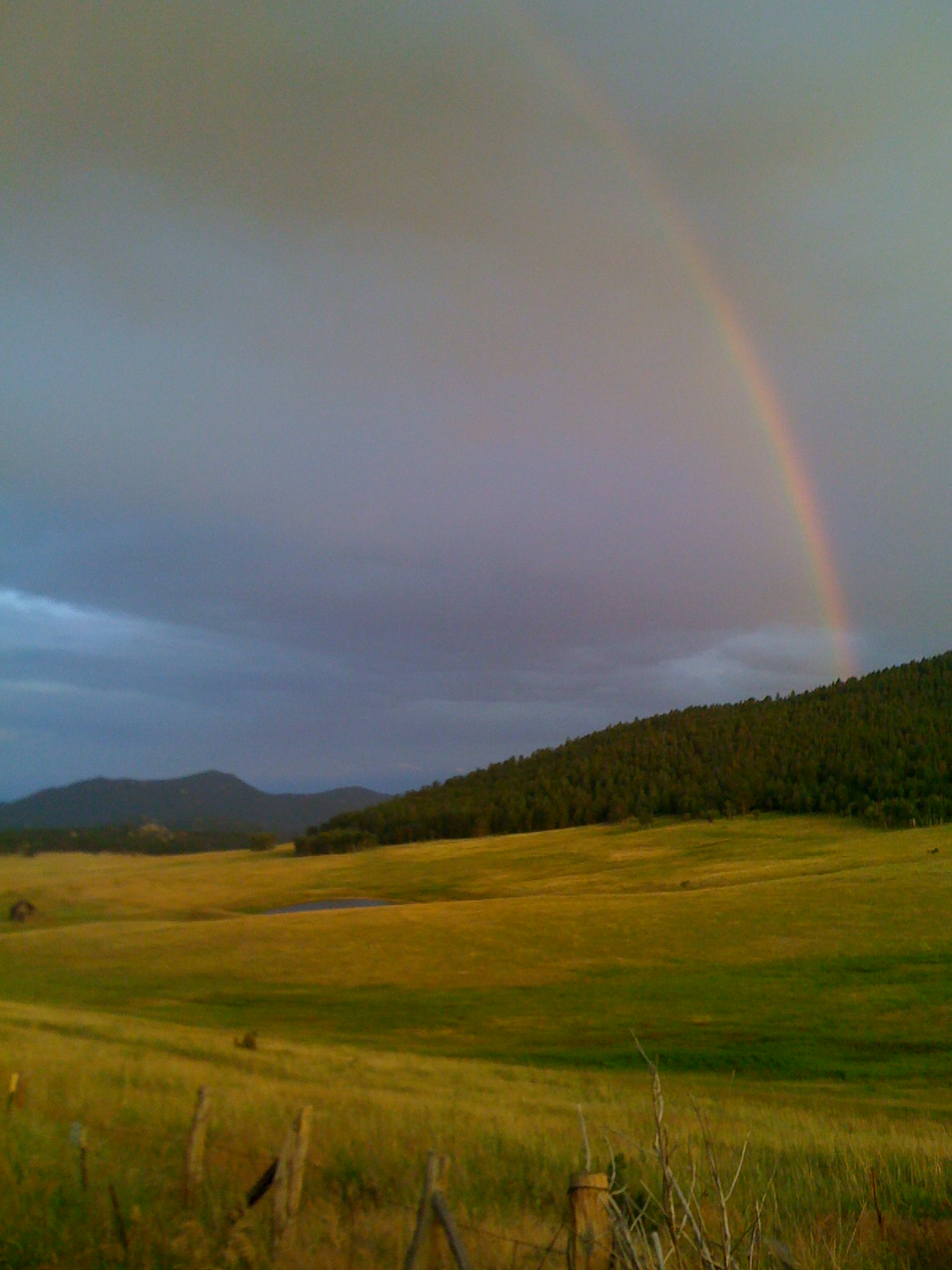
- Countryside in the park
- Interactive map of Elk Meadow Park
- Location: Evergreen, Colorado, US
- Coordinates: 39.67°N 105.37°W
- Area: 1,140 acres (4.6 km^{2})
- Operator: Jefferson County Open Space

Elk Meadow Park is a park and trail system in Evergreen, Colorado managed by Jefferson County Open Space. This program began acquiring these ranchlands in 1977 to create the extensive protected area, which is made larger by adjacent public lands. Contiguous to Elk Meadow Park on the west is Bergen Peak Park, a "conservation/wilderness" area that is part of the Denver Mountain Parks system. Through a cooperative effort between the two park management entities, the Too Long Trail in Elk Meadow Park continues to Bergen Peak, at 9,708 ft (2959 m). Noble Meadow, a conservation easement adjacent to Elk Meadow Park on the northwest along Mestaa'ėhehe Road (formerly Squaw Pass Road), has no public access. The Bergen Peak Wildlife Area, managed by Colorado Parks and Wildlife, is next to the Park's southwestern boundary.

== Trails and Other Activities ==
Elk Meadow Park is home to a number of outdoor activities. In the summertime, the many miles of trail serve as a place to run, walk, jog, mountain bike, and simply enjoy Mother Nature. Most of the park is open meadows with grasses and wildflowers for the residents of Jefferson County to see and enjoy. There are two seasonal creeks running through the park, Bergen Creek and Troublesome Creek, and several smaller springs which feed very small creeks. Bergen Creek turns into a swampy area at State Highway 74 which spurs the growth of cattails and wet-loving grasses. The Park encompasses the lower eastern slopes of Bergen Peak, which is covered in Ponderosa Pines, Douglas Firs, Aspens, and some small groves of Lodgepole Pines.

The trail system begins at a small parking area with restrooms and a gazebo for summertime picnics. There are several small shelters along the trails erected by various organizations in Evergreen, Colorado. During the winter, the snow that falls in the park blows west to east creating a difficult drifting problem for Highway 74 once getting to 12 feet (3.7 m) tall in the Winter of 06-07. During winters with abnormal amounts of snow, it is possible to cross-country ski throughout the park and even alpine ski on Bergen Peak. Hiwan Golf Club borders the Park's eastern side. Overall, the park is a nice place for a summertime jog through the foothills of Colorado.

Dogs must be leashed in Elk Meadow Park proper, as in all other Open Space Parks. An off-leash opportunity lies just across Stagecoach Boulevard at the Elk Meadow Park Dog Off-Leash Area.

On April 4, 2017, Jefferson County Open Space closed the entire 107-acre dog park within Elk Meadow Park indefinitely. This was in contrast to a previous plan intended to keep portions of the dog park open.
