= Hiwan Homestead Museum =

- Hiwan Museum
- U.S. National Register of Historic Places
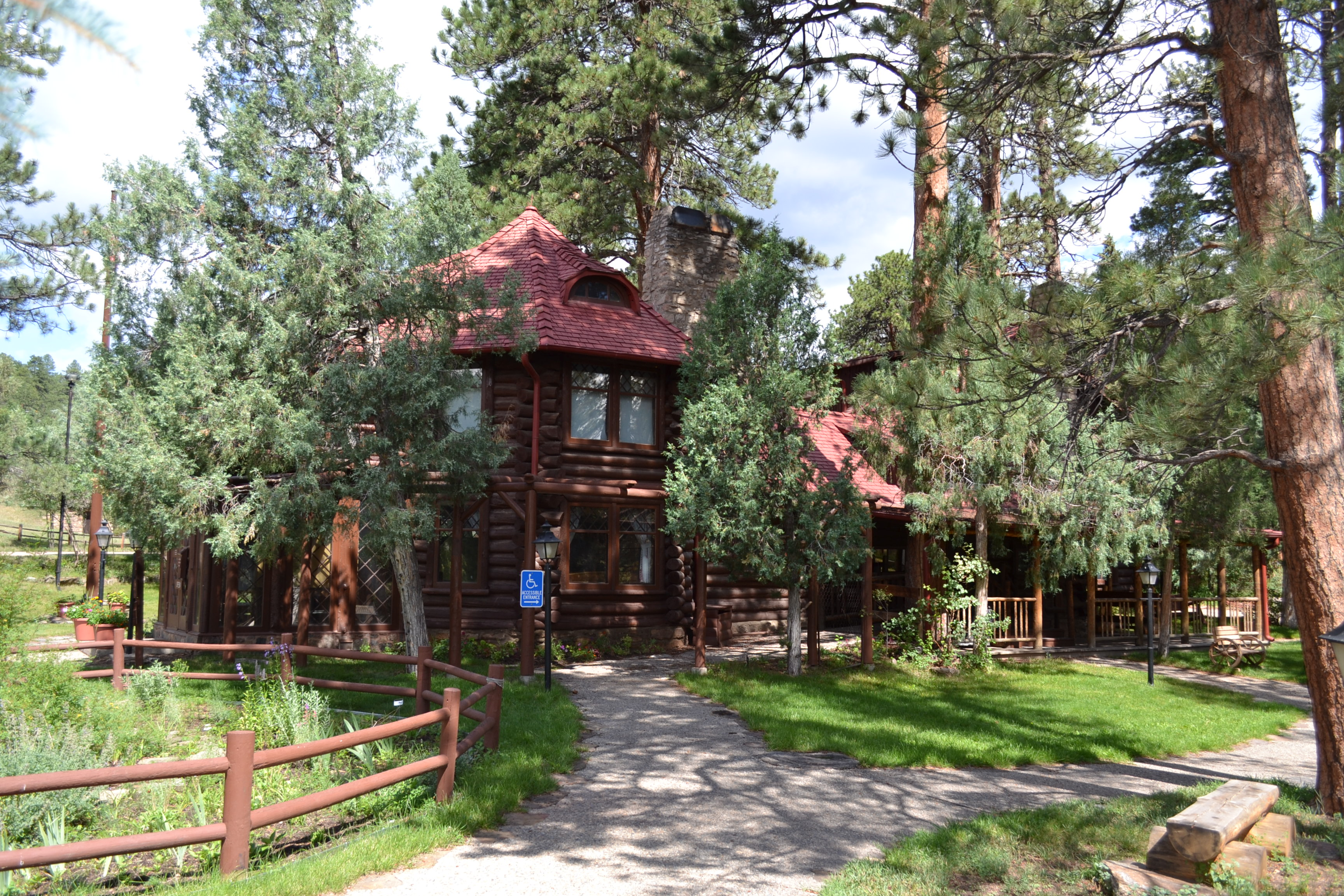
- Location: Evergreen, Colorado
- Coordinates: 39.6391623°N 105.3238051°W
- Built: 1893-1918
- Architect: Jock Spence
- Architectural style: Rustic
- Website: Hiwan Heritage Park
- NRHP reference No.: 74000583
- Added to NRHP: 9 April 1974

The Hiwan Museum is a historic house museum in Evergreen, Colorado.

It is located at 4208 S. Timbervale Drive in Evergreen.

== History ==
The property was purchased in the late 1880s by Mary Neosho Bailey Williams, widow of General Thomas Williams. The only structure on the property at the time was a hay barn, which Mary and her daughter Josepha hired local carpenter John "Jock" Spence to convert into a three-room cabin, finished in 1893. They named the property Camp Neosho, after Mary's middle name.

After Mary died in 1914, the Douglases contracted Jock Spence to expand the house to a total of seventeen rooms. The expansion was completed in 1918. The house remained in the ownership of the Williams-Douglas family until Josepha died in 1938. The house was sold to the Buchanan family, who used the building as the headquarters for Hiwan Ranch, and their descendants who lived in the home until 1973.

In 1974, Jefferson County purchased the property, marking the first usage of county Open Space funds in the area. The county commissioners asked the Evergreen Mountain Area Historical Society (then the Jefferson County Historical Society) to supply volunteers to provide tours, exhibits and educational programs for the museum, which opened to the public on August 3, 1975. Heritage Grove, a four-acre parcel adjacent to the property, was purchased separately in 1977.

Jeffco Public Schools students visit the museum as part of the fourth grade Colorado history unit, an optional field trip program which began in 1976.

== Architecture ==
The Rocky Mountain rustic style log building utilizes local pine, fir, and granite. Its architectural features are described in its National Register of Historic Places nomination:

"Two two-story octagonal towers are prominently featured, one at each end of the house. . . . As the building grew, it was built to accommodate large standing trees, making for unusual room arrangements and architectural features. Seven stone fireplaces and chimneys are included. A main stairway is of solid log puncheon construction, and the stone masonry and wood joinery are of the highest quality throughout. Logs were peeled and oiled, and roof lines are made to conform with the rambling nature of the structure. All foundations are of stone masonry, in fine condition. Most of the interior shows the log wall finish or is wood paneled. Scattered through the house are fine Indian motif designs painted by the noted anthropologist Eric Douglas, and the second story room in the west octagon tower exhibits the Gothic arches used to create the chapel atmosphere desired by Canon Douglas, noted Episcopalian liturgist who inherited the house from Mrs. Williams as her son-in-law."

Other structures built by Jock Spence in the area include the Church of the Transfiguration chapel (c. 1900, moved to its current site in 1961), the Evans–Elbert Ranch residence (1908), the Bell Tower at Church of the Transfiguration (1911), the Anne Evans Mountain Home (1911), Greystone Lodge (1917), and Center Stage (1924, originally the Evergreen Conference Meeting House).
