= Kate Peck Kent =

Museum archeological textile specialist

- Kate Peck Kent, from a 1987 publication.
- Born: Kate Stott Peck; 1914; Washington, D.C.
- Died: October 28, 1987 (aged 72–73); El Rito, New Mexico
- Occupation: Anthropologist

Kate Peck Kent (1914 – October 28, 1987), born Kate Stott Peck, was an American anthropologist who studied the history of Pueblo and Navajo textiles.

== Early life and education ==
Kate Stott Peck was born in Washington, D.C. in 1914, and raised in Denver, the daughter of Allen Steele Peck and Jessie Peck. Her father was an officer in the U. S. Forest Service.

Peck earned a bachelor's degree from the University of Denver, and pursued graduate studies at Columbia University. She completed a master's degree at the University of Arizona in 1949, with a thesis titled "An analysis and interpretation of the cotton textiles from Tonto National Monument." In retirement, she continued her studies at the School of American Research in Santa Fe, New Mexico.

== Career ==
In the late 1930s, Kent was assistant to curator Frederic Huntington Douglas at the Denver Art Museum. She taught anthropology at Barnard College and the University of Denver, and was senior research associate at the Museum of International Folk Art. After she retired from the University of Denver in 1976, she was an adjunct professor at the University of New Mexico. She also served as an officer of the Southwestern Association of Indian Affairs.

She wrote a short book, The Story of Navajo Weaving (1961), for the Heard Museum in Phoenix, Arizona. Kent's later books were Prehistoric Textiles of the Southwest (1983), Pueblo Indian Textiles: A Living Traditions (1983), and Navajo Weaving: Three Centuries of Change (1985). "I'll bet there's not one archaeologist who's read my books," she said in a 1987 interview. "But weavers love my books. They are my most loyal supporters. I've talked to a lot of weavers' guilds and given workshops prehistoric techniques. Weavers love to experiment." Hopi weaver Ramona Sakiestewa was inspired by Kent's work to explore historical techniques for her Ancient Blanket Series.

She wrote an introduction to H. P. Mera's rediscovered Spanish American Blanketry (1984). She contributed an essay on Southwestern weaving to I Am Here (1989), a book published to mark the opening of the Museum of Indian Arts and Culture in Santa Fe, New Mexico.

== Personal life and legacy ==
In 1937, Kate Peck married educator Arthur Tufnell Sabine Kent. They had three children, Hilary, Stephen, and Jonathan. Kate Peck Kent died in 1987, aged 73 years, at her home in El Rito, New Mexico.

In 1988, the Wheelwright Museum of the American Indian held a memorial exhibit, "Living Traditions: Kate Peck Kent and the Study of Historic Pueblo Textiles". Her papers and library were donated to the Wheelwright Museum after her death.
