= Jonathan Kearsley =

American military officer and politician

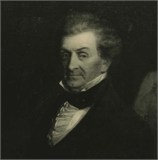

5th Mayor of Detroit
- In office 1829–1829
- Preceded by: John Biddle
- Succeeded by: John R. Williams

3rd Mayor of Detroit
- In office 1826–1826
- Preceded by: Henry Jackson Hunt
- Succeeded by: John Biddle

Personal details
- Born: 1786 Middletown, Pennsylvania
- Died: 1859 (aged 72–73) Detroit, Michigan
- Education: Washington College

Jonathan Kearsley (1786–1859) was an American military officer and politician. He fought in the War of 1812 and was a two-time mayor of Detroit.

== Early life ==
Jonathan Kearsley was born in Middletown, Pennsylvania on August 20, 1786, and graduated from Washington College in Washington, Pennsylvania (now Washington & Jefferson College) in 1811. He was one of the founders of the Union Literary Society at Washington College. He joined the Army the following year as a First Lieutenant in the Second Artillery Corps, eventually reaching the rank of Major. He fought in several battles during the War of 1812, including the Battle of Stoney Creek, Battle of Crysler's Farm, and the Battle of Chippawa (following the Capture of Fort Erie). In the latter battle, he was wounded, and one of his legs was amputated. The operation was performed incorrectly and he suffered pain for the rest of his life from it.

In 1815, Kearsley married Margaret Hetich. The couple had three children: Edmund Roberts (1816), Rebekah H (1817), and Martha I. (1819); Margaret died in 1821. He later married Rachel Valentine.

== Life in Detroit ==
He held the office of Collector of Revenue Taxes in Virginia from 1817 until 1819, when he moved to Detroit and was appointed Receiver of Public Monies, a title which he held for thirty years. He lived on the corner of Jefferson Avenue and Randolph Street in Detroit.

He served as mayor of Detroit two separate times, first appointed by the council to fill the unexpired term of Henry Jackson Hunt in 1826, and then being elected in 1829. He also served on the Board of Trustees of the University of Michigan from 1827 to 1837, and again on its re-organized Board of Regents from 1838 until 1852. He died in 1859 and is buried in Elmwood Cemetery in Detroit.

Kearsley Creek, a tributary of the Flint River, Kearsley Community Schools, and a major street in Flint, Michigan are named after him, as was the short-lived (1839–43) Kearsley Township, Michigan.

Political offices
Preceded by Henry Jackson Hunt	Mayor of Detroit; 1826	Succeeded by John Biddle
Preceded by John Biddle	Mayor of Detroit; 1829	Succeeded by John R. Williams
