= Indian Art of the United States (exhibition) =

1941 exhibition at the Museum of Modern Art

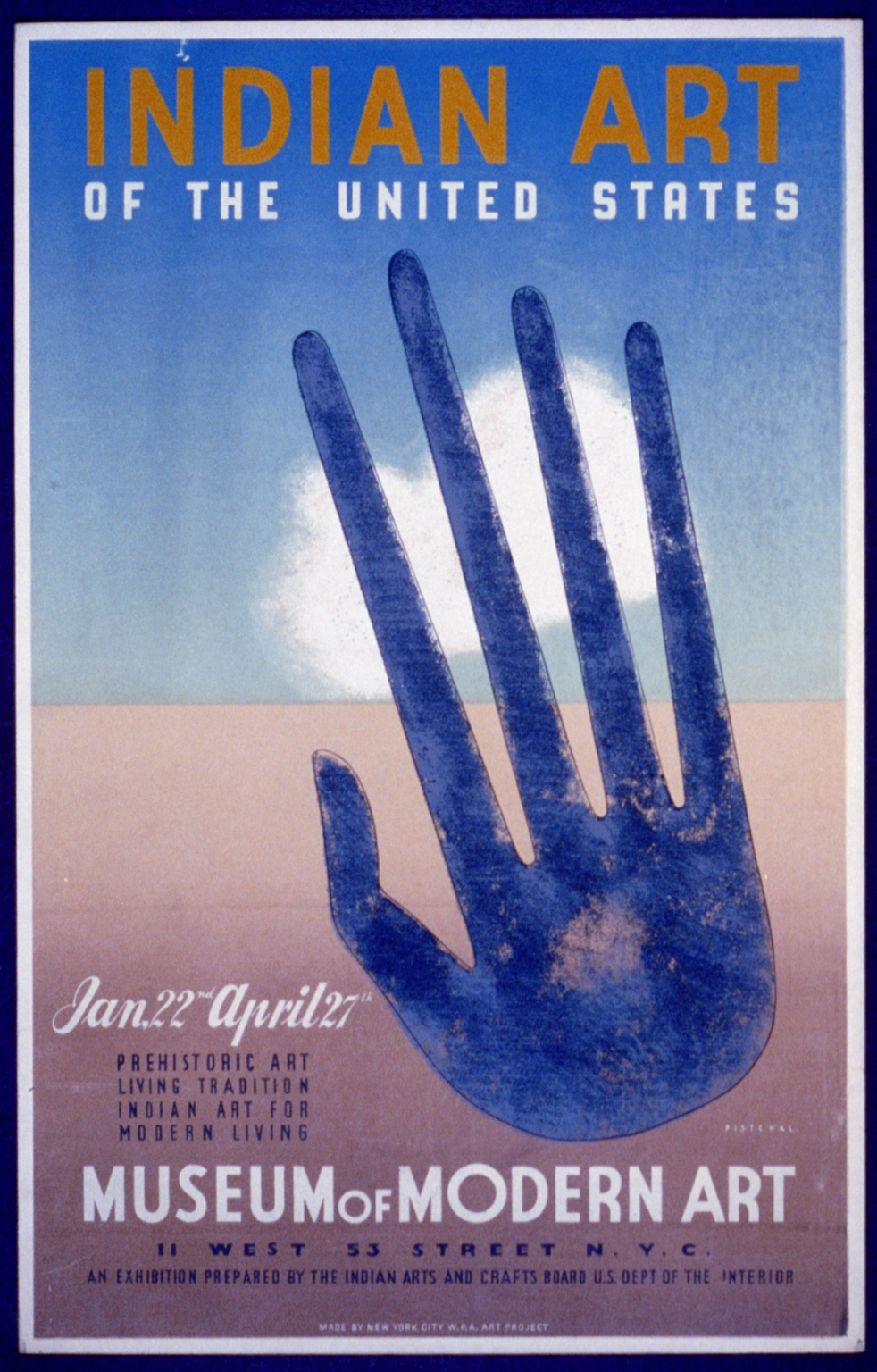
Exhibition poster, design attributed to Pistchal

Indian Art of the United States was an exhibition of Native American art mounted at the 1939 Golden Gate Exposition in San Francisco that traveled to the Museum of Modern Art in 1941. Curated by Rene d'Harnoncourt, then director of the Indian Arts and Crafts Board, this exhibition "filled the entire gallery space of the Museum of Modern Art with Indian works ... and constituted the first full-scale exhibition of Indian art in a major American art museum." A catalogue for the exhibition was published by MomA and was co-written by D'Harnoncourt and Frederic Huntington Douglas, then curator of Indian art at the Denver Art Museum. Douglas was also director of educational activities for the exhibition during its presentation at the 1939 San Francisco Golden Gate Exposition.

Janet Berlo, scholar of Native American art, called this exhibition a "museological landmark, both for its imprimatur it gave to Native art, and for its cutting edge modern installation techniques, in which Native art was elegantly presented."

== Details of the exhibition ==
According to the original press release, the exhibition included "approximately one thousand items" and spanned 20,000 years of American Indian art.

As noted by the authors of "American Indian Art: The Collecting Experience," "The MoMA show, which attempted to give Indian art its due and erase its association with mere technical achievement or cheap curios, was divided into three parts. One gallery featured pre-historic art. A second showed art of "living Indian cultures," and a third focused on the contribution of Indian art to the contemporary American scene."

The authors also noted that the last section "was based on the same patriotic sentiment that had been prevalent a decade earlier, but was reinforced at this time by the national introspection brought on by the European war. The public was interested in all things that were "truly American" and d'Harnoncourt wrote that theme into his presentation. He spoke of the work as "folk" rather than 'primitive art.'"

Art historian Bill Anthes writes that "at the museum entrance, mounted at street level and flush with MoMA's modernist facade, the curators installed a thirty-foot contemporary totem pole carved in 1939 by artist John Wallace). Inside, the exhibition was divided into three sections, "Prehistoric," "Living Traditions," and "Indian Art for Modern Living," which occupied, respectively, the third, second, and first floors of MOMA."

Works by modern Native American artists, Fred Kabotie (Hopi), Harrison Begay (Diné), and Oscar Howe (Dakota) were installed on the first floor of MoMA.

The exhibition architect was Henry Klumb. It was supported by "Commissioners of the Indian Arts and Crafts Board: John Collier, Chairman; Ebert K. Burlew, Dr. A. V. Kidder, James W. Young, and Lorenzo Hubbell," as well as "The United States National Museum, Washington, D.C., and the Royal Ontario Museum of Anthropology, Toronto."

More details of the exhibition was described by George C. Valliant in his exhibition review, published in The Art Bulletin, Vol. 23, No. 2 (June 1941), pp. 167–169. Also see the records of the Indian Arts and Crafts Board and the chapter on the show's design in "The Power of Display: A History of Exhibit Installation at the Museum of Modern Art."

== Publications ==
The catalogue of this exhibition was written by Douglas and d'Harnoncourt: Indian Art of the United States (1941). It included 16 color plates, 200 halftones, and was 220 pages. The intent of the catalog was to "present Indian art in an aesthetic context, as art, and to help the public see it in a new way."

First Lady of the United States, Eleanor Roosevelt, wrote the introduction to the catalogue: "At this time, when America is reviewing its cultural resources, this book and the exhibit on which it is based open up to us age-old sources of ideas and forms that have never been fully appreciated. In appraising the Indian's past and present achievements, we realize not only that his heritage constitutes part of the artistic and spiritual wealth of this country, but also that the Indian people of today have a contribution to make towards the America of the future."

"In dealing with Indian art of the United States, we find that its sources reach far beyond our borders, both to the north and to the south. Hemispheric inter-change of ideas is as old as man on this continent. Long before Columbus, tribes now settled in Arizona brought traditions to this country that were formed in Alaska and Canada; Indian traders from the foot of the Rocky Mountains exchanged goods and ideas with the great civilizations two thousand miles south of the Rio Grande. Related thoughts and forms that are truly of America are found from the Andes to the Mississippi Valley."

"We acknowledge here a cultural debt not only to the Indians of the United States but to the Indians of both Americas."

== Lenders to the exhibition ==
- Mr. William Henry Claflin Jr., Belmont, Mass.
- Mr. Miguel Covarrubias
- Mrs. William Denman, San Francisco, Calif.
- Mr. Rene d'Harnoncourt, Washington, DC
- Mrs. Charles Dietrich, Santa Fe, New Mexico
- Mr. and Mrs. Kenneth B. Disher, Newton Highlands, Mass.
- Mr. Frederic Huntington Douglas, Denver, Colorado
- Mr. Charles de Young Elkus, San Francisco, Calif.
- Mrs. O. L. N. Foster, Denver, Colorado
- Mrs. Harold L. Ickes, Washington, DC
- Dr. Ralph Linton, New York, New York
- Mrs. Audrey McMahon, New York, New York
- Mr. Earl Morris, Boulder, Colorado
- Dr. Herbert Spinden, New York, New York
- Mrs. W. M. Tallant, Manatee, Florida
- Miss Mary Cabot Wheelwright, Santa Fe, New Mexico
- Miss Amelia Elizabeth White, Santa Fe, New Mexico

As well as "many museums and institutions throughout the country."

== Opening reception ==
The exhibition opening on January 22, 1941 was attended by first lady of the United States, Eleanore Roosevelt and various Native artists, including Fred Kabotie.

== Lasting impact on the American Indian art field ==
Art historian, W. Jackson Rushing III devotes an entire chapter of his book, Native American Art and the New York Avante-Garde, to this exhibition and its impact on the field of American Indian arts, calling it "a watershed event in the history of Euro-American proprietary interest in Native American art in the twentieth century."

According to the authors of Primitivism and Twentieth-century Art: A Documentary History, "This exhibition played an important role in changing the public perception of Native American art and had a profound impact on many of the artists who would later be associated with Abstract Expressionism."
