= Rene d'Harnoncourt =

American art curator

René d'Harnoncourt (May 17, 1901 – August 13, 1968) was an Austrian-born American art curator. He was director of the Museum of Modern Art, New York, from 1949 to 1967.

== Background ==
Count Rene d'Harnoncourt was born on May 17, 1901, in Vienna, Austria of Austrian, Czech, and French descent. He was the son of Count Hubert d'Harnoncourt and his wife, the former Julie Mittrowsky. Although he showed an interest in art as a child, he received a technical education. After his family suffered severe financial losses, he moved to Paris in 1924, and went to Mexico in 1926. D'Harnoncourt initially eked out a minimal living as a commercial artist, but quickly acquired a reputation for his knowledgeable advice to American antique collectors.

== Career ==
In 1927, d’Harnoncourt went to work for Frederick W. Davis, who operated one of the most important antiquities and folk art shops in Mexico City. Davis was among the first to collect, display and sell the work of the emerging Mexican artists such as Diego Rivera, José Clemente Orozco, and Rufino Tamayo; others who frequented the shop included Miguel Covarrubias and Jean Charlot. D'Harnoncourt assisted in buying and selling antiques and contemporary works and also organized displays and exhibits in the showroom.

In 1929 and 1930, d'Harnoncourt organized an exhibition of Mexican fine and applied arts at the Metropolitan Museum of Art in New York that then traveled to other American cities. D'Harnoncourt left Davis's shop in 1933 and moved to the United States. That year, he married Sarah Carr (1903-2001) and became host of the radio program Art in America. Among many others, Margaret Lefranc was a guest speaker several times during 1934–1935, educating listeners on American and European art. He briefly taught at Sarah Lawrence College. In 1936, d'Harnoncourt became the general manager of the Indian Arts and Crafts Board (IACB), a New Deal agency created to revive Native American arts and crafts. To promote Native American craftwork, d'Harnoncourt, along with Frederic Huntington Douglas, developed an exhibit of Native American arts and crafts for the 1939 Golden Gate International Exposition in San Francisco. Its success led to an even larger show at New York's Museum of Modern Art, the influential Indian Art of the United States exhibition that opened in January 1941.

In 1944, the Museum of Modern Art appointed D'Harnoncourt to be vice president in charge of foreign activities. He proved to be an expert exhibit installer and notable collector. In 1949, the museum named him director, a position he would hold until 1967. He was responsible for a series of significant exhibitions over the course of his tenure as director, including Lipchitz (1954), Rodin (1963), and Picasso (1967). D'Harnoncourt was also an advisor to Nelson Rockefeller. In 1965, he was appointed to a commission to choose modern art works for the Governor Nelson A. Rockefeller Empire State Plaza Art Collection in Albany, New York. He was a tireless advocate of modern art.

== Death and legacy ==
D'Harnoncourt retired from the position of director in 1967. He was killed on New Suffolk, Long Island by a drunk driver roughly a year later.

D'Harnoncourt's only child, Anne Julie d'Harnoncourt (1943–2008), served as director and eventually CEO of the Philadelphia Museum of Art from 1982 until her death.

== Notes ==
- Hellman, Geoffrey T., "Profiles: Imperturbable Noble," New Yorker 35 (7 May 1960).
- Lynes, Russell, Good Old Modern: An Intimate Portrait of the Museum of Modern Art, Athenaeum, New York 1973 pages 264–283.
- Schrader, Robert Fay, The Indian Arts & Crafts Board: An Aspect of New Deal Indian Policy, University of New Mexico Press, Albuquerque, 1983, pages 124–128.

== Publications ==
- 1931: The Hole in the Wall, Alfred A Knopf, ASIN B002N61RLK
- 1931: Mexicana,: A book of pictures, Alfred A Knopf, ASIN B00085UVA6
- 1933: Beast, Bird and Fish: An Animal Alphabet, Alfred A. Knopf, ASIN B00085PXD6
- 1946: ARTS OF THE SOUTH SEAS, The Museum of Modern Art/ Simon and Schuster, ASIN B000IVZTDY
- 1954: Ancient Arts of the Andies, The Museum of Modern Art, New York, ASIN B000TR8SJO
- 1959: The New American Painting, As Shown in Eight European Countries 19581–959, The Museum of Modern Art, ASIN B000GWXUEA
- 1964: The Museum of Modern Art: A Pictorial Chronicle, Art in America, ASIN B005O2GWOC

Cultural offices
Preceded by Alfred H. Barr, Jr. 1944-1949 - job was handled by the chairman of the museum's Coordination Committee and Director of Curatorial Department	Directors of the Museum of Modern Art; 1949-1968	Succeeded by Bates Lowry
