= Henry Jackson Hunt (politician) =

American politician

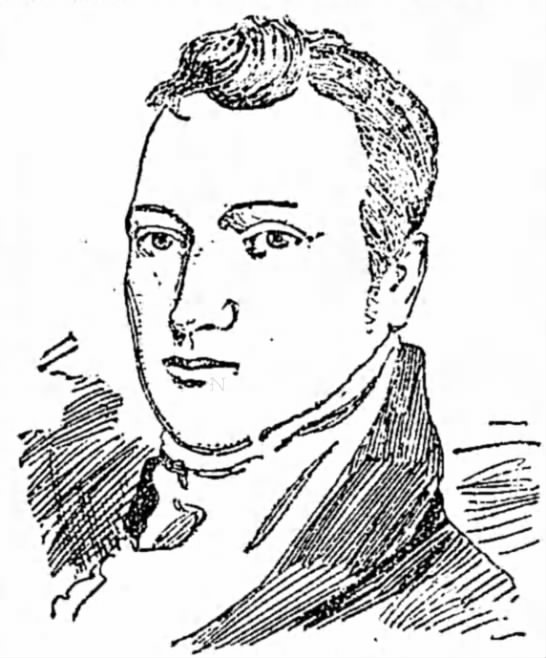

2nd Mayor of Detroit, second charter
- In office 1826–1826
- Preceded by: John R. Williams
- Succeeded by: Jonathan Kearsley

Personal details
- Born: 1786 Watertown, New York, US
- Died: September 15, 1826 (aged 39–40) Detroit, Michigan, US
- Spouse: Ann MacIntosh

Henry Jackson Hunt (frequently called "Henry I. Hunt") was a politician and businessman from Detroit, Michigan.

Henry Jackson Hunt was born in Watertown, New York, in 1786, the first son of American Revolutionary War colonel Thomas Hunt. He arrived in Detroit around 1800 and went into the mercantile and real estate business, in some cases in partnership with Lewis Cass. In 1811, he married Ann MacIntosh, daughter of Angus MacIntosh, a well-to-do fur trader and "Earl of Moy." The couple had no children. The younger Henry Jackson Hunt went on to become a brigadier general in the American Civil War.

The elder Henry Jackson Hunt held various political offices in the city, including Colonel of the militia (1800- 1815), County Court Judge (1815), City Assessor (1817), Trustee of the University of Michigan (1821), and in 1826 Mayor of Detroit. Hunt died while in office, on September 15, 1826.

Political offices
Preceded by John R. Williams	Mayor of Detroit; 1826	Succeeded by Jonathan Kearsley
