= Thomas Hunt (soldier) =

American military officer

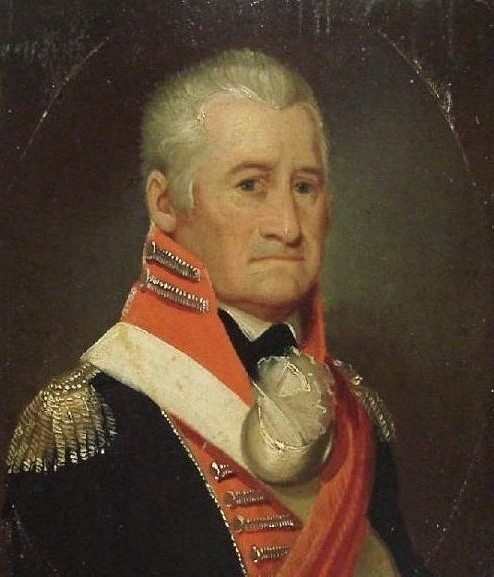
Portrait of Thomas Hunt

Thomas Hunt (1754—1808) was an American military officer who served in the Continental Army during the American Revolutionary War and later served in the United States Army where he rose to the rank of colonel and served until his death.

== Biography ==
Hunt was born in Watertown, Massachusetts in September 1754 to John Hunt and Ruth Fessenden Hunt. He was a sergeant in Captain Craft's company of Minute Men when it was activated on April 19, 1775 in the alarm which led to the Battle of Lexington and the Battle of Concord.

In May he was commissioned an ensign in Bond's Regiment and served in the Siege of Boston and fought at the Battle of Bunker Hill. In January 1776 he was commissioned ensign and adjutant of the 25th Continental Regiment. He was promoted to brigade major on October 20, 1776.

On February 1, 1777 he was commissioned as a captain-lieutenant in Jackson's Additional Continental Regiment commanded by Colonel Henry Jackson. He was promoted to captain on March 1, 1779. He was wounded at the Battle of Stony Point on July 16, 1779. The regiment was re-designated as the 16th Massachusetts Regiment on July 23, 1780.

He was transferred to the 9th Massachusetts Regiment on January 1, 1781 and was wounded in action for a second time at the Siege of Yorktown on October 14, 1781. He was transferred to the 3rd Massachusetts Regiment on January 1, 1783 and then served in the Jackson's Continental Regiment when it was formed in November 1783 as the only remaining unit of the Continental Army. He was discharged when the regiment was disbanded on June 20, 1784.

Captain Hunt was admitted as an original member of The Society of the Cincinnati in the state of Massachusetts when it was established in 1783.

He was commissioned in the United States Army as a captain in the 2nd Infantry Regiment on March 4, 1791 and was one of the few survivors of St. Clair's Defeat later that year. The 2nd Infantry was re-designated as the 2nd Sub-legion in 1792. He was promoted to major on February 18, 1793 and fought with the unit at the Battle of Fallen Timbers in 1794.

He was reassigned to the 1st Infantry on November 1, 1792 and was promoted to lieutenant colonel on April 1, 1802. He was promoted to colonel and given command of the regiment on April 11, 1803 and served in that position until his death at Fort Bellefontaine in Missouri on August 18, 1808.

Colonel Hunt was originally buried at Fort Bellefontaine but his remains were eventually moved to Jefferson Barracks National Cemetery near St. Louis, Missouri.

== Family ==
He was married to Eunice Wellington Hunt (1772-1809). They had eleven children: sons Henry Jackson, Thomas Jr., George, Samuel Wellington, William Brown, John Elliott, and Charles Cotesworth Picnkney Hunt, and daughters Ruth Fessenden, Abigail, Mary LeBaron, and Eliza Hunt. Henry Jackson Hunt served as the second mayor of Detroit. Ruth Hunt married Abraham Edwards, a leading politician in Michigan Territory, and Abigail Hunt married Captain Josiah Snelling during the Siege of Detroitin the War of 1812. Snelling later rose to the rank of Colonel and became both the commander and namesake of Fort Snelling.

Hunt's grandson was Brevet Major General Henry Jackson Hunt, a career Army officer who served in the Mexican War and commanded the Union artillery at the Battle of Gettysburg.
