= Frederick W. Davis =

Frederick W. Davis (April 17, 1878 – March 7, 1961) operated an antiquities and folk art shop in Mexico City. Davis was an early collector and dealer in pre-Columbian and Mexican folk art and his shop was a place where Mexican Modern artists who were interested in pre-Columbian and folk art, often met.

Davis was born and raised in Illinois. He came to Mexico about 1910 and worked for the Sonora News Company selling newspapers, guidebooks, and souvenirs on the Southern Pacific Railway line south from Nogales, Arizona. Davis, who was interested in folk art and pre-Columbian art of Mexico became the manager of the Sonora Company's arts and crafts showroom in Mexico City. During the Mexican Revolution (1910-1920), many Mexican antiques came on the market. After 1920, as stability returned and Americans became interested in Mexico, Davis's shop attracted collectors and other visitors. Artists of the emerging “Mexican school” were interested in both historical and contemporary folk art, so they also gravitated to Davis's shop. Davis was among the first to collect, display and sell their work. He exhibited work by Diego Rivera, José Clemente Orozco, and Rufino Tamayo; others who came to the shop included Miguel Covarrubias and Jean Charlot. Davis also displayed work by Americans including George Biddle, Caroline Durieux, and William Spratling.

In 1927, Davis hired Rene d'Harnoncourt as his assistant. D'Harnoncourt worked with Davis until 1933, helping in the purchase and sale of art objects and organizing displays and exhibits in the showroom.

Davis was also a noted silversmith and produced numerous pieces of Mexican jewelry.

Davis was gay, but few accounts of his life mention this fact.

In 1933, Davis left the Sonora News Company and became head of the department of antiques and fine crafts in Frank Sanborn's Mexico City store. He continued supporting Mexican artists and craftsmen by displaying and selling their work.

== Sources and further reading ==
- Morrill, Penny C., and Berk, Mexican Silver: 20th Century Handwrought Jewelry & Metalwork, Schiffer, Atglen PA 1994, pages 22–29. This essay is the best summary of Davis's career. ISBN 0-88740-610-6
- Oles, James, editor, South of the Border: Mexico in the American Imagination, 1914-1947, Smithsonian Institution Press, Washington DE 1993, pages 123-127; ISBN 1-56098-294-2
- Delpar, Helen, The Enormous Vogue of Things Mexican: Cultural Relations between the United States and Mexico, 1920-1935, University of Alabama Press, Tuscaloosa 1992, pages 5–6, 65-66; ISBN 0-8173-0582-3
- Davis, Mary L., and Pack, Greta, Mexican Jewelry, University of Texas Press, Austin 1963, pages 150-167.
- Fergusson, Erna Mexico Revisited, Alfred A Knopf, New York 1955, pages 305-313.
