= Evergreen Conference District =

Historic district in Colorado, United States

Coordinates: 39.637°N 105.313°W

- U.S. National Register of Historic Places
- U.S. Historic district
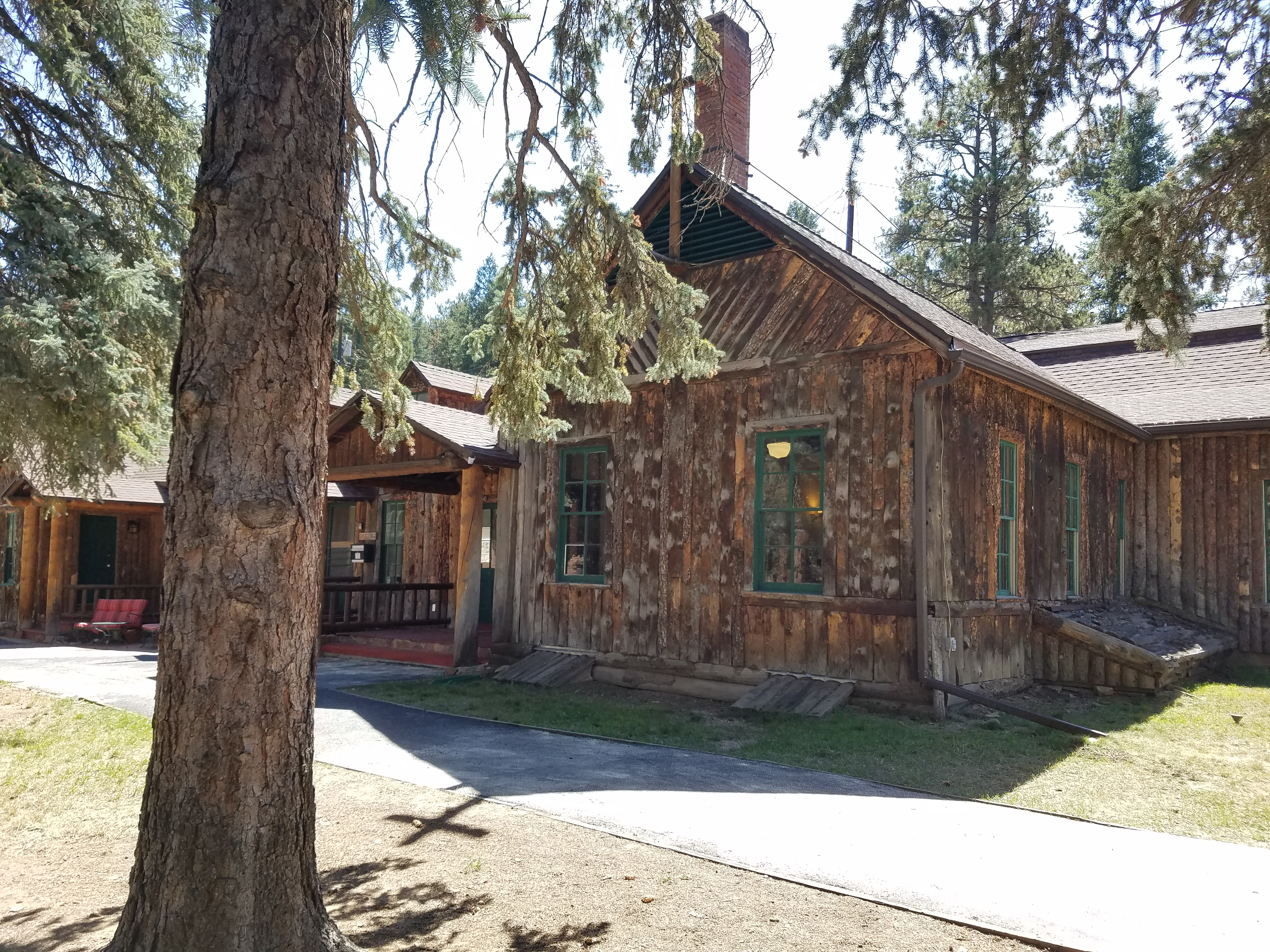
- St. John's Episcopal Church in the Evergreen Conference District

- Location within Colorado
- Location: CO 74, Evergreen, Colorado
- Area: 7 acres (2.8 ha)
- Architect: Jock Spence, et al.
- Architectural style: Shingle Style
- NRHP reference No.: 79000611
- Added to NRHP: May 1, 1979

Evergreen Conference District is a music conference center in Jefferson County, Colorado, near Evergreen. It was listed as a historic district on the National Register of Historic Places on May 1, 1979. The district is located at Highway 74 along Bear Creek.

== Overview ==
The seven-acre conference center is owned by the Evergreen Music Conference, the Sisters of St. Mary's, and the Episcopal Church of the Transfiguration. The oldest continuing music center in the United States, in operation since 1907, has 23 buildings that include the Stone Library, Meeting House, St. Raphael's, and the Bell Tower.

According to History Colorado it is significant for its:

- appearance of early 20th century Evergreen and architectural features,
- connection with Canon Charles Winfield Douglas, an expert on the plainsong mass, and
- association with music, education, religion, and social/humanitarian activity

== History ==
The land on which the district resides had been Ute, Arapaho, and Cheyenne hunting grounds. Traders and fur trappers passed through the land by 1821 and prospectors entered the area during the gold rush beginning in 1858. Bergen Park was established in 1859 when Thomas Cunningham Bergen built a log cabin and named his property. In 1877 Evergreen became its own place, unique from Bergen Park, in 1877 when Amos Post opened a trading post, followed by a general store, on what is now Evergreen's main street. He married Sarah Bergan, Thomas' daughter. The area was first called Evergreen when D.P. Wilmot expressed his admiration of the firs, spruce, and pines on the land he acquired about 1875 in Buffalo Park. Ranchers, loggers and farmers established themselves along Bear Creek. City dwellers established summer retreats in the mountainous region. Denver Mountain Parks between Morrison and Golden was established in 1991, which brought more people to the area during the summer.

In the 1880s a log bunkhouse was constructed for the use of lumbermen. Robert H. Stewart converted it into a hotel by 1872. He added eight guest cottages and called his property Sprucedale Resort. The first church meetings were held in the area in 1872.

Mary Neosho Williams, widow of Civil War General Thomas Williams, created a retreat center beginning in 1893 that ultimately evolved into the Evergreen Conference Center when she began holding Episcopal church services in tents. She purchased Stewart Hotel, which was transformed into St. Mark's in the Wilderness church, later Mission of the Transfiguration. Her daughter, Dr. Josepha Williams, also purchased land around the Evergreen area and received the former Stewart Hotel through her mother's will. She donated land and buildings for the creation of the center.

For recuperative reasons, Canon Charles Winfred Douglas, who was married to Josepha Williams, came to Evergreen for its summer retreats and music camps beginning in 1897. He led musical events, which increased the popularity of the center. He was priest of the retreat's church for more than 40 years.

The Episcopal church bought the resort upon Stewart's death and had John "Jock" Spence build some additional buildings and remodeled some of the existing buildings. The family of Canon Charles Winfield Douglas, an expert on the Plain-Song Mass, and Mary Neosho Williams (wife of General Thomas Williams) donated land and buildings for the district. Buildings from Frederick J. Bancroft's 2,500-acre ranch were also donated to the Evergreen Conference District in 1923.
