= Hiwan Golf Club =

Golf course in Evergreen, Colorado

- Interactive map of Hiwan Golf Club
- 39.671377°N 105.34916°W

Club information
- Location: Evergreen, Colorado
- Established: 1962
- Type: Private
- Tota holes: 18
- Tournaments: Colorado Open (1964-1991)
- Website: http://www.hiwan.com/
- Designed by: Press Maxwell
- Par: 70
- Length: 7,097 yards (6,489 m)

Hiwan Golf Club is an 18-hole golf course located in Evergreen, Colorado.

The golf course is 7,097 yards from the back tees and is a par 70. The fairways are lined with ponderosa pines and Douglas firs and Bergen Peak provides background for nearly every hole. The greens at Hiwan are difficult with oscillations in elevation and steep drops. There are two water holes at Hiwan; the par-4 Number 7 is 450 yards long with a large pond protecting the green and the par-3 Number 12 is the most picturesque hole with a series of waterfalls and three sculpted bunkers. There is also a large practice facility that operates in the summer with a driving range, chipping green and a spacious putting green.

It has a half-size Olympic sized pool, a water slide, 5 tennis courts, and locker rooms. The clubhouse was designed in the 1960s and has two restaurants: The Grill and the Hiwan Room. It also has a library, a pro shop and an exercise room with treadmill, elliptical, weights, and a weight machine.

In the winter, with nearly 120 annual inches of snow, the course serves as a cross-country ski area with three varying trails.
