= John R. Williams =

American politician (1782–1854)

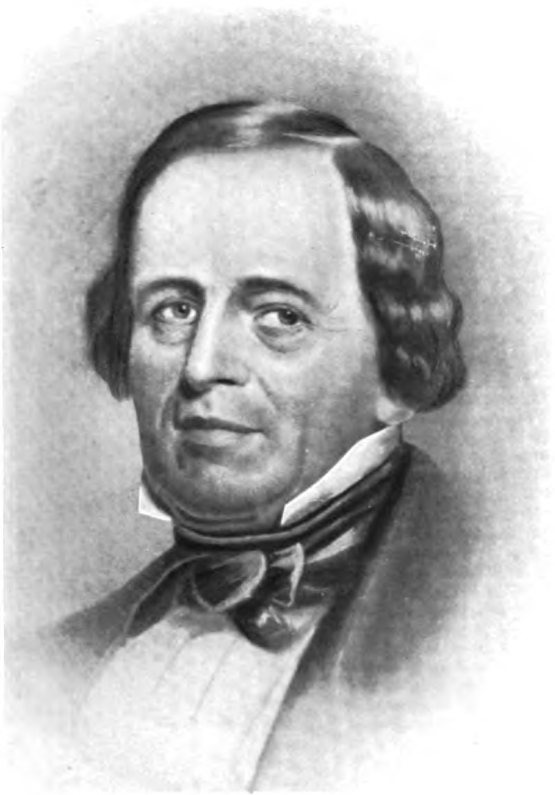

1st Mayor of Detroit, second charter
- In office 1824–1825
- Preceded by: New Title
- Succeeded by: Henry Jackson Hunt
- In office 1830–1830
- Preceded by: Jonathan Kearsley
- Succeeded by: Marshall Chapin
- In office 1844–1847
- Preceded by: Zina Pitcher
- Succeeded by: James A. Van Dyke

Personal details
- Born: May 4, 1782 Detroit, Quebec, British America
- Died: October 20, 1854 (aged 72) Detroit, Michigan, U.S.

John R. Williams (May 4, 1782 – October 20, 1854) was an American soldier, merchant, and politician who is best known for serving as the first mayor of Detroit, Michigan, after the city's reincorporation. In total, he served as Detroit's mayor for five other terms. He also was a brigadier general in the United States Army during the Black Hawk War. He was an early benefactor of the University of Michigan and served as one of its first trustees.

== Early life and education ==
Born in Detroit, he was baptized as John Williams (he later adopted the "R" in his name to distinguish himself from another John Williams who was living in Detroit at the time). His parents were Thomas Williams and Cecile Campeau, of Detroit's Campau family. His father, who had been active in civic and political affairs, died before December 12, 1785, at which time Joseph Campeau (which he generally spelled Campau) leased a house to Cecile (widow of Thomas Williams) that was located north of the Detroit River and adjacent to Joseph Campau's property. His mother married Jaques Leson in 1790 and lived in what is now St. Clair County, Michigan. Cecile died on June 24, 1805, and was buried in the St. Anne's church cemetery. Raised in his mother's French Canadian community, he spoke and wrote fluently in both French and English.

== Personal life ==
Williams married Mary Mott, one of his cousins, in 1804. She was the daughter of Gershom Mott, who served during the Revolutionary War, and Elizabeth Williams, who was the sister of Thomas Williams from Albany. The couple had ten children together. One of them, Union General Thomas Williams, was killed in action during the Civil War at the Battle of Baton Rouge in 1862.

== Career ==
=== Military and business career ===
Williams served in the Territorial Militia from 1796 to 1799 at Fort Marsac in Tennessee. Upon leaving the army, he returned to Detroit and joined his uncle, Joseph Campau, in his successful mercantile business. During the War of 1812, Williams again served in the militia, this time as the captain of an artillery company.

=== Political life ===
After the end of the war, Williams was appointed Associate Justice of the County Court for Michigan in 1815. He went on to serve as a County Commissioner and Adjutant General of the Territory, and at his death was the senior Major General of the state militia. In 1824, Williams wrote the City Charter and served as the first official mayor of the City of Detroit. He was also elected and served as the fourth and thirteenth mayor in 1830 and 1844–1846, respectively. Besides serving as mayor, Williams was a landowner, merchant, and bank president during his lifetime. He served as one of the first trustees of the University of Michigan, was president of the Detroit Board of Education, and was a delegate to the first Michigan Constitutional Convention. In 1831, Willams and Joseph Campau started the Democratic Free Press newspaper, which became the Detroit Free Press.

Mary died on January 18, 1830. Williams died at the age of seventy-two on October 20, 1854. He is interred at Elmwood Cemetery in Detroit.

== Legacy ==
Today, a street in metropolitan Detroit bears his name. "John R" Street was named while John R. Williams was still living, which is atypical to the way most roads obtain their name. In fact, Williams gave the road its name himself.

== See also ==
- List of mayors of Detroit

Political offices
New office	Mayor of Detroit; 1824–1825	Succeeded by Henry Jackson Hunt
Preceded by Jonathan Kearsley	Mayor of Detroit; 1830	Succeeded by Marshall Chapin
Preceded by Zina Pitcher	Mayor of Detroit; 1844–1847	Succeeded by James A. Van Dyke
