= Thomas Williams (pioneer) =

Settler in Detroit, Michigan

Thomas Williams (died November 30, 1785), originally from Albany, New York, settled in Detroit, Michigan, in 1765. Williams was a merchant, landowner, and was active in civic and political affairs. Goods were transported to Detroit from Albany via canoe, which could take a number of months for a round-trip.

Williams petitioned for equitable opportunities to engage in trade at Fort Niagara and Detroit. In his role as justice of the peace, he was charged to uphold the law and punish those who were deemed to have broken the law. As notary, he executed legal documents for the settlement. He was also town crier and took the 1782 census. He married Cecile Campeau from the prominent Campau family that had settled in Michigan in 1700s. Their son, John R. Williams, was the first mayor of Detroit under the second charter.

== Early life ==
Williams was born in Albany, New York, where his ancestors settled in 1690. He served in the New York militia as an officer. Williams settled in Detroit in 1765. (Note: Burton states that Williams settled in Detroit during the Revolutionary War (1775-1783), but he was involved in trade and had signed petitions by 1766.)

== Career ==
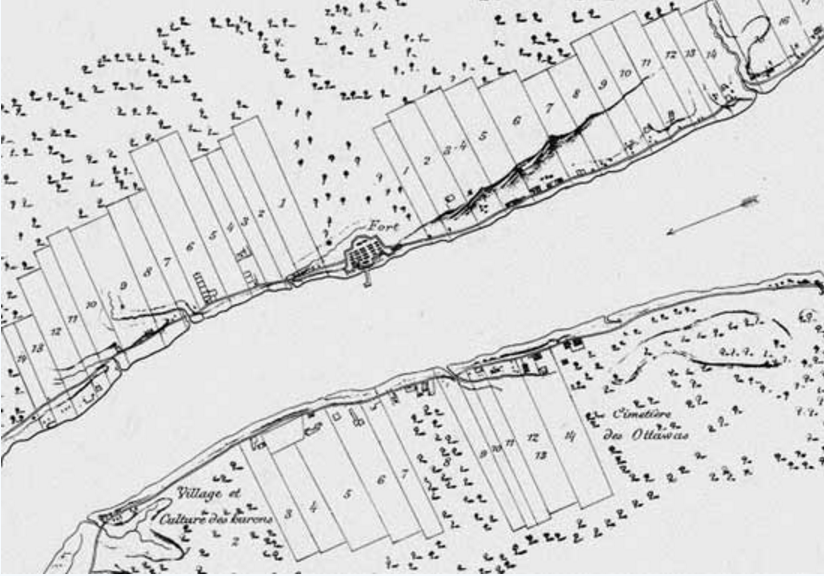
The 1796 map illustrates ribbon farms flanking Fort Detroit (center, above Detroit River) and across the river at what is now Windsor, Canada. The ribbon farm concept originated with Antoine de la Mothe Cadillac's founding of the fort, first called Fort Pontchartrain du Détroit, in July 1701. (See also the original map that covers a wider area, including Belle Isle Park)

Williams was a trader and licensed merchant, who brought goods to Detroit from Albany via canoe. The round-trip could take many months.

Williams signed a number of petitions against British regulation of the sale goods at posts. The political climate was difficult between the British, who had taken rule of Detroit in 1760 and the French, with whom they were still at war in 1762. Native American forces under the direction of Pontiac attacked the British in May 1763 in what was called the Siege of Fort Detroit. Some traders coming to Fort Detroit were killed or captured. Civil unrest continued, particularly regarding the restriction of trading to the posts by the British and a monopoly that William Rutherford held at Fort Niagara. Williams signed a number of petitions against the regulations in 1766 and 1767. In 1766, he was one of the merchants allowed to trade at Fort Niagara. In 1768, he made the round-trip with George Meldrum from Schenectady. His partners included John Casety and, at least until 1776, William Edgar. Native Americans, on their way to Fort Niagara, were often met by people on the lake who sold them their wares, which drove down business at the fort. The British rules also favored the French who were given the fur trade, allowed to winter with Native Americans and trade in the process, and got around rules for trading rum by selling on credit. Many of the traders in the region that signed the petitions were from Albany, many of the Albany Dutch.

Williams was also active in civic and political affairs. Richard B. Lernhout, the military commandant, appointed Williams as a justice of the peace and notary and/or judge in Detroit under British rule. He served as justice of the peace from 1778 to 1784. As justice of the peace, his duties were to upload local statutes and ordinances, issue warrants, punish and/or imprison those who broke the statutes and ordinances, and ensure the quiet rule of Detroit. He was to execute legal documents in his role as notary. Williams voted in Detroit's first election that was held in 1768 to elect a judge and justice. He was one of Detroit's town criers who passed on the news of the day by speaking to a crowd of people or by ringing a bell while walking through the streets and calling out the news.

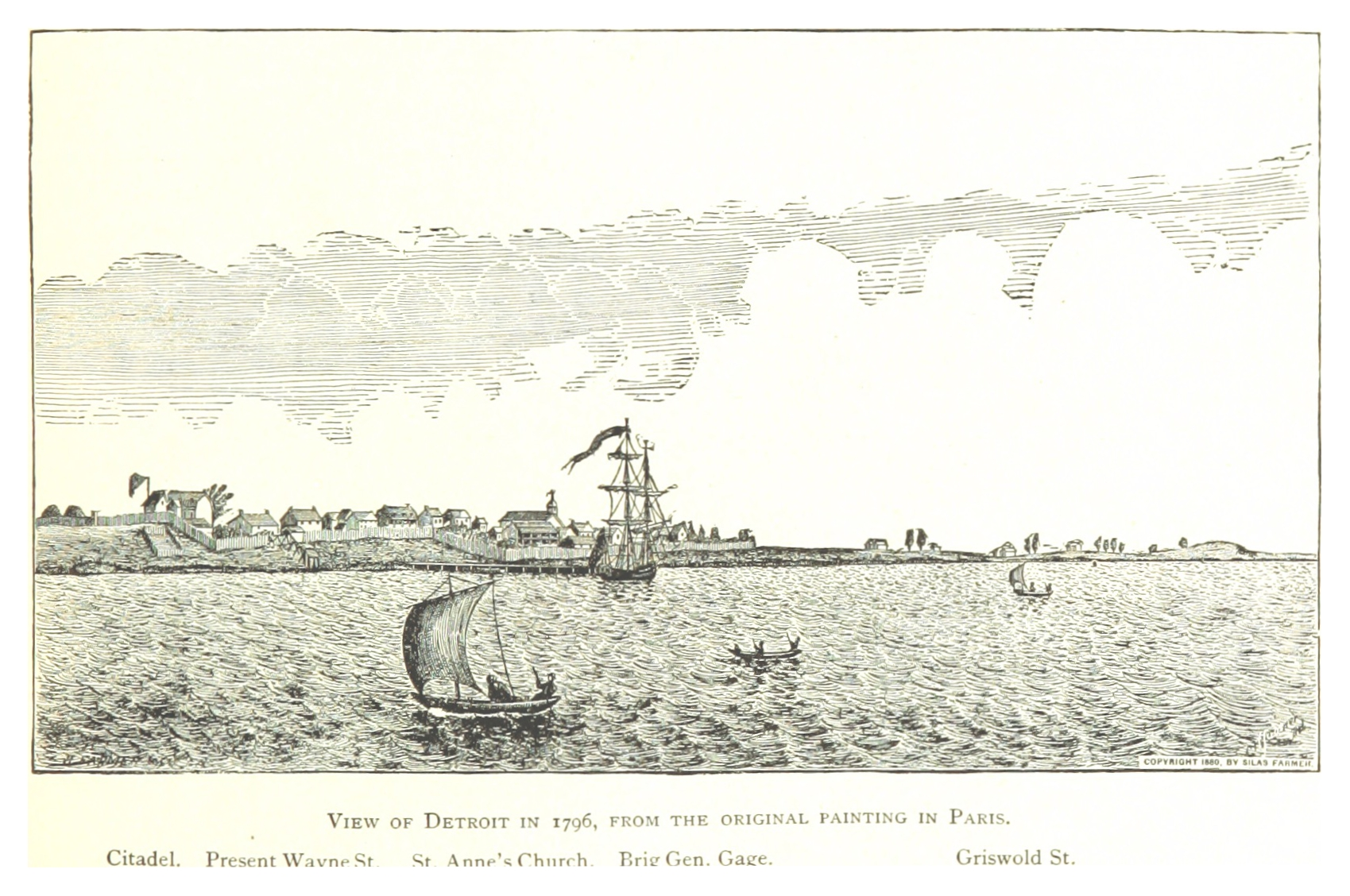
View of Detroit in 1796. Landmarks from left to right: Citadel, Wayne Street, St. Anne's Church, Brig. Gen. Gage, and Griswold Street

Williams performed the census for Detroit in 1782 and calculated that there were 2,191 people compared to 1,367 in 1773. The totals do not include Native Americans resident in the city nor the soldiers and others connected to the garrison. Clarence M. Burton attributes the growth to people moving to the area to avoid the war. With the number of people in the garrison and those detained as prisoners of war and refugees, Burton estimates that there likely more than 3,000 people in Detroit in 1782.

== Personal life ==
Williams married Marie Cecile (commonly called Cecile or Cecelia) Chapeau. The marriage was performed by A.S. DePeyster, commandant of Fort Detroit on May 7, 1781. It was one of Detroit's early Protestant marriages. Cecile was born September 12, 1764. They were married by the commandant because they did not wish to be married by a Catholic priest. Their marriage certificate stated that the couple's relationship would be "conformable by the rule of the Church of England." Cecile was from a prominent family. Her father was Jacques Chapeau and her brothers were Barnabas, Denis, Joseph, Louis, Nicolas and Toussaint Chapeau. Joseph was the state's first millionaire. His mother's family had a French heritage and had been in Michigan since 1710.

They had three children: Catherine, Elizabeth, and John R. Williams. Elizabeth taught in a Catholic school that she co-founded with three other young women under the auspices of Gabriel Richard, a Detroit priest. She lived a single, chaste lifestyle, like a nun. (Note: Burton states that Elizabeth was born August 2, 1786 and was the daughter of Thomas and Cecile. Thomas died before December 12, 1785 when Cecile was named as his widow on a lease.) In 1809, Catherine married Jean Baptiste Peltier with whom she had two children. John R. was the first mayor of Detroit. He married his cousin, Mary Mott Williams, in 1804.

Williams lived on Woodbridge Street in the 9th Ward in Detroit and owned a lot of land in the area. During the Revolutionary War, William's property in Albany was confiscated. He or his family later had the property returned to them.

He died of the measles on November 30, 1785. On December 12 of the same year, Cecile leased a house from Joseph Campeau that was north of the Detroit River and adjacent to Joseph Campeau's property. At the time of his death, much of his property was lost; there was just some property in Albany and a 600-acre farm on the Huron River of Lake St. Clair. Although these were significant holdings for the time, there was a large loss of his property, perhaps due to his wife's lavish lifestyle or the carelessness of Casety, his partner. Cecile and her children lived on the St. Clair property after Williams' death.

In July 1790, Cecile married Jaques Leson (also spelled Loson and Lauson) and they lived in what is now St. Clair County, Michigan. Cecile died on June 24, 1805, and was buried in the St. Anne's church cemetery.

== Bibliography ==
- Clarence Monroe Burton; William Stocking; Gordon K. Miller (1922). The City of Detroit, Michigan, 1701-1922. S. J. Clarke publishing Company. p. 170.
- Walter Scott Dunn (2001). The New Imperial Economy: The British Army and the American Frontier, 1764-1768. Greenwood Publishing Group. ISBN 978-0-275-97180-9.
- Walter Scott Dunn (2005). People of the American Frontier: The Coming of the American Revolution. Greenwood Publishing Group. ISBN 978-0-275-98181-5.
