= Evergreen, Colorado =

Census-designated place in Jefferson County, Colorado, United States

- Census-designated place
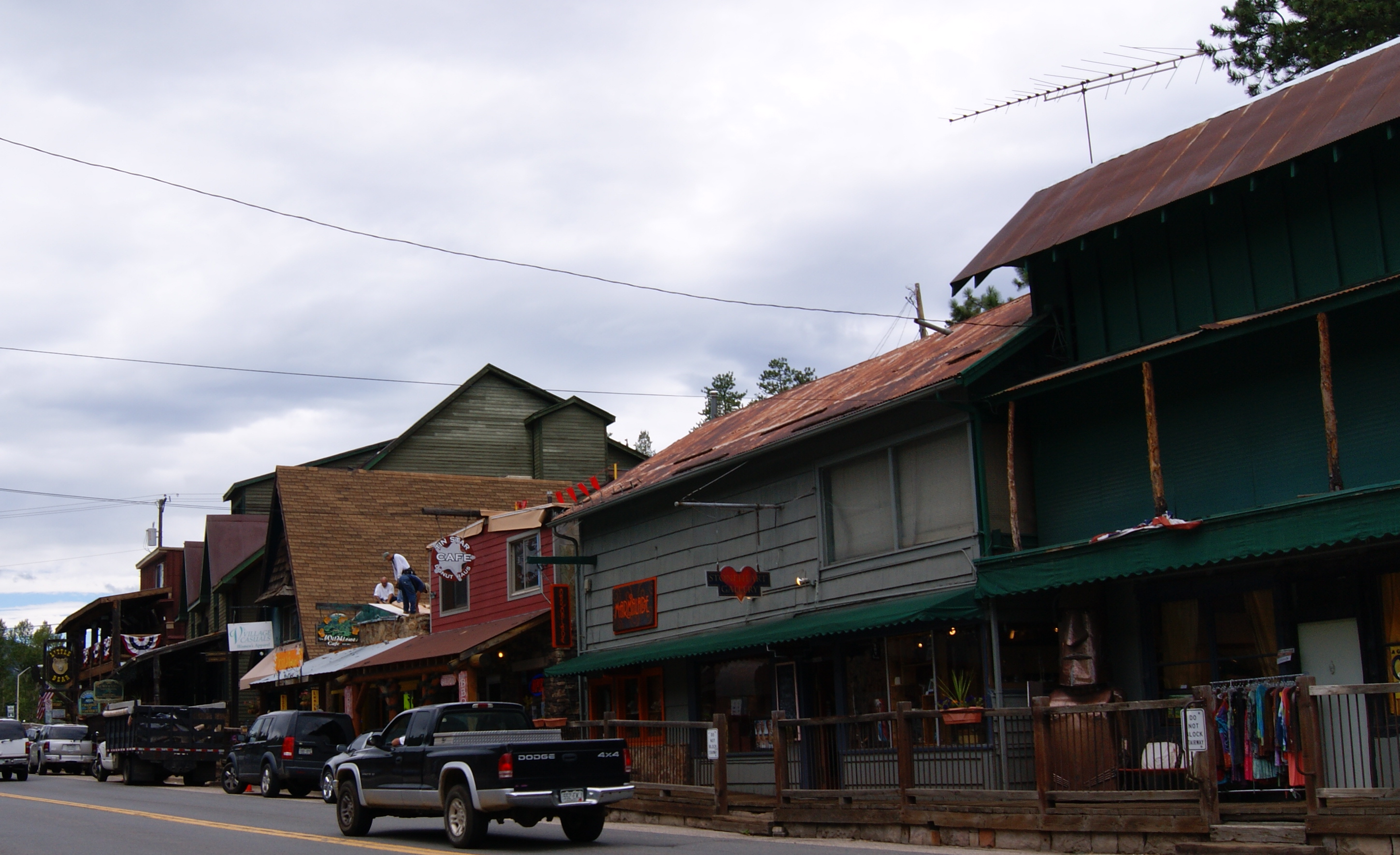
- Downtown Evergreen.

- Location of the Evergreen CDP in Jefferson County, Colorado
- Coordinates: 39°36′50″N 105°21′10″W
- Country: United States
- State: Colorado
- County: Jefferson
- Settled: 1859

Government
  - Type: unincorporated community
  - Body: Jefferson County

Area
  - Total: 11.605 sq mi (30.056 km^{2})
  - Land: 11.522 sq mi (29.843 km^{2})
  - Water: 0.082 sq mi (0.213 km^{2})
- Elevation: 7,162 ft (2,183 m)

Population (2020)
  - Total: 9,307
  - Density: 807.7/sq mi (311.9/km^{2})
- Time zone: UTC−07:00 (MST)
  - Summer (DST): UTC−06:00 (MDT)
- ZIP code: 80439, 80437
- Area codes: 303/720/983
- GNIS CDP ID: 2408097
- FIPS code: 08-25390
- Website: Evergreen Metro District

Evergreen is an unincorporated community, a post office, and a census-designated place (CDP) located in and governed by Jefferson County, Colorado, United States. The CDP is a part of the Denver-Aurora-Centennial, CO Metropolitan Statistical Area and the Front Range Urban Corridor. The Evergreen post office has the ZIP Codes 80439 and 80437 (for post office boxes). At the 2020 census, the population of the Evergreen CDP was 9,307. The Evergreen Metropolitan District provides services.

== History ==
The Evergreen area was first settled in 1859 in what was then the Territory of Kansas. The community was named for evergreen trees surrounding the town. The Colorado Blue Spruce Monument is located in the town, in honor of the Colorado state tree. The Evergreen, Colorado Territory, post office opened on July 17, 1876.

Evergreen is predominately a bedroom community, in that most people living there commute to Denver for work.

On September 10, 2025, Evergreen High School was the location of a shooting in which a gunman wounded two students before committing suicide.

== Geography ==
Evergreen is located in western Jefferson County in the Front Range foothills, 19 miles (31 km) west of Denver.

At the 2020 United States Census, the Evergreen CDP had an area of 7,427 acres (30.056 km^{2}), including 53 acres (0.213 km^{2}) of water, most of which being the Evergreen Reservoir.

=== Climate ===
According to the Köppen Climate Classification system, Evergreen has an humid continental, with mild summers and wet all year, abbreviated "Dfb" on climate maps.

Climate data for Evergreen, Colorado, 1991–2020 normals, extremes 1961–present
Month	Jan	Feb	Mar	Apr	May	Jun	Jul	Aug	Sep	Oct	Nov	Dec	Year
Record high °F (°C)	74 (23)	71 (22)	78 (26)	82 (28)	92 (33)	97 (36)	96 (36)	96 (36)	92 (33)	85 (29)	77 (25)	71 (22)	97 (36)
Mean maximum °F (°C)	63.5 (17.5)	62.7 (17.1)	69.4 (20.8)	74.5 (23.6)	81.1 (27.3)	89.3 (31.8)	91.5 (33.1)	88.9 (31.6)	86.3 (30.2)	78.8 (26.0)	69.8 (21.0)	63.5 (17.5)	92.6 (33.7)
Mean daily maximum °F (°C)	44.4 (6.9)	44.4 (6.9)	51.0 (10.6)	55.6 (13.1)	64.0 (17.8)	75.6 (24.2)	81.2 (27.3)	79.1 (26.2)	72.5 (22.5)	61.1 (16.2)	51.1 (10.6)	44.0 (6.7)	60.3 (15.7)
Daily mean °F (°C)	28.4 (−2.0)	28.9 (−1.7)	35.9 (2.2)	41.2 (5.1)	49.7 (9.8)	59.3 (15.2)	65.1 (18.4)	63.2 (17.3)	56.0 (13.3)	44.9 (7.2)	35.6 (2.0)	28.3 (−2.1)	44.7 (7.1)
Mean daily minimum °F (°C)	12.5 (−10.8)	13.4 (−10.3)	20.9 (−6.2)	26.7 (−2.9)	35.5 (1.9)	43.1 (6.2)	49.0 (9.4)	47.2 (8.4)	39.5 (4.2)	28.7 (−1.8)	20.2 (−6.6)	12.6 (−10.8)	29.1 (−1.6)
Mean minimum °F (°C)	−7.1 (−21.7)	−6.9 (−21.6)	1.4 (−17.0)	11.7 (−11.3)	23.1 (−4.9)	33.2 (0.7)	41.3 (5.2)	38.8 (3.8)	27.6 (−2.4)	12.6 (−10.8)	1.6 (−16.9)	−7.0 (−21.7)	−12.8 (−24.9)
Record low °F (°C)	−38 (−39)	−30 (−34)	−18 (−28)	−9 (−23)	10 (−12)	27 (−3)	26 (−3)	29 (−2)	8 (−13)	−5 (−21)	−15 (−26)	−29 (−34)	−38 (−39)
Average precipitation inches (mm)	0.63 (16)	0.86 (22)	1.76 (45)	2.37 (60)	2.49 (63)	1.73 (44)	2.20 (56)	2.30 (58)	1.55 (39)	1.21 (31)	0.81 (21)	0.71 (18)	18.62 (473)
Average snowfall inches (cm)	8.8 (22)	11.4 (29)	17.0 (43)	14.9 (38)	2.7 (6.9)	0.0 (0.0)	0.0 (0.0)	0.0 (0.0)	1.1 (2.8)	6.5 (17)	10.4 (26)	8.0 (20)	80.8 (205)
Average precipitation days (≥ 0.01 in)	4.9	5.7	6.9	8.1	9.7	9.0	11.7	12.0	7.5	5.7	4.8	5.0	91.0
Average snowy days (≥ 0.1 in)	4.6	5.4	5.6	4.9	1.5	0.0	0.0	0.0	0.4	2.5	4.0	4.8	33.7
Source 1: NOAA
Source 2: National Weather Service

== Demographics ==
The United States Census Bureau initially defined the Evergreen CDP for the 1970 United States census.

Evergreen CDP, Colorado
Year	Pop.	±%
1970	2,321	—
1980	6,376	+174.7%
1990	7,582	+18.9%
2000	9,216	+21.6%
2010	9,038	−1.9%
2020	9,307	+3.0%
Source: United States Census Bureau

=== 2020 census ===
As of the 2020 census, Evergreen had a population of 9,307. The median age was 47.1 years. 21.5% of residents were under the age of 18 and 20.8% of residents were 65 years of age or older. For every 100 females there were 98.2 males, and for every 100 females age 18 and over there were 96.8 males age 18 and over.

89.1% of residents lived in urban areas, while 10.9% lived in rural areas.

There were 3,744 households in Evergreen, of which 30.2% had children under the age of 18 living in them. Of all households, 62.8% were married-couple households, 13.2% were households with a male householder and no spouse or partner present, and 19.3% were households with a female householder and no spouse or partner present. About 21.3% of all households were made up of individuals and 10.4% had someone living alone who was 65 years of age or older.

There were 4,071 housing units, of which 8.0% were vacant. The homeowner vacancy rate was 1.4% and the rental vacancy rate was 6.7%.

Racial composition as of the 2020 census
Race	Number	Percent
White	8,444	90.7%
Black or African American	18	0.2%
American Indian and Alaska Native	47	0.5%
Asian	86	0.9%
Native Hawaiian and Other Pacific Islander	2	0.0%
Some other race	117	1.3%
Two or more races	593	6.4%
Hispanic or Latino (of any race)	430	4.6%

== Law and government ==
Since Evergreen is an unincorporated area, services are provided by multiple agencies. The county maintains the roads (less State Highway 74), oversees planning and zoning, provides primary and secondary education through its school district and provides law enforcement through its sheriff's office. Evergreen Fire/Rescue provides fire protection and emergency medical response service. Water and sewer services operate under the administration of the Evergreen Metropolitan District.

== Transportation ==
The two major roads in Evergreen are State Highway 74 and County Highway 73. Highway 74 runs south from I-70 through Bergen Park and northern Evergreen to downtown, then turns east and follows Bear Creek Canyon to its end at State Highway 8 near Red Rocks Park. Highway 73 runs south from downtown Evergreen to connect with U.S. Highway 285 in Conifer.

Bus service in Evergreen is offered by Denver Regional Transportation District. TheRide regional routes E and Z run to downtown Denver, and there is a "Call-n-Ride" curb-to-curb transportation service in town.

== Sites of interest ==
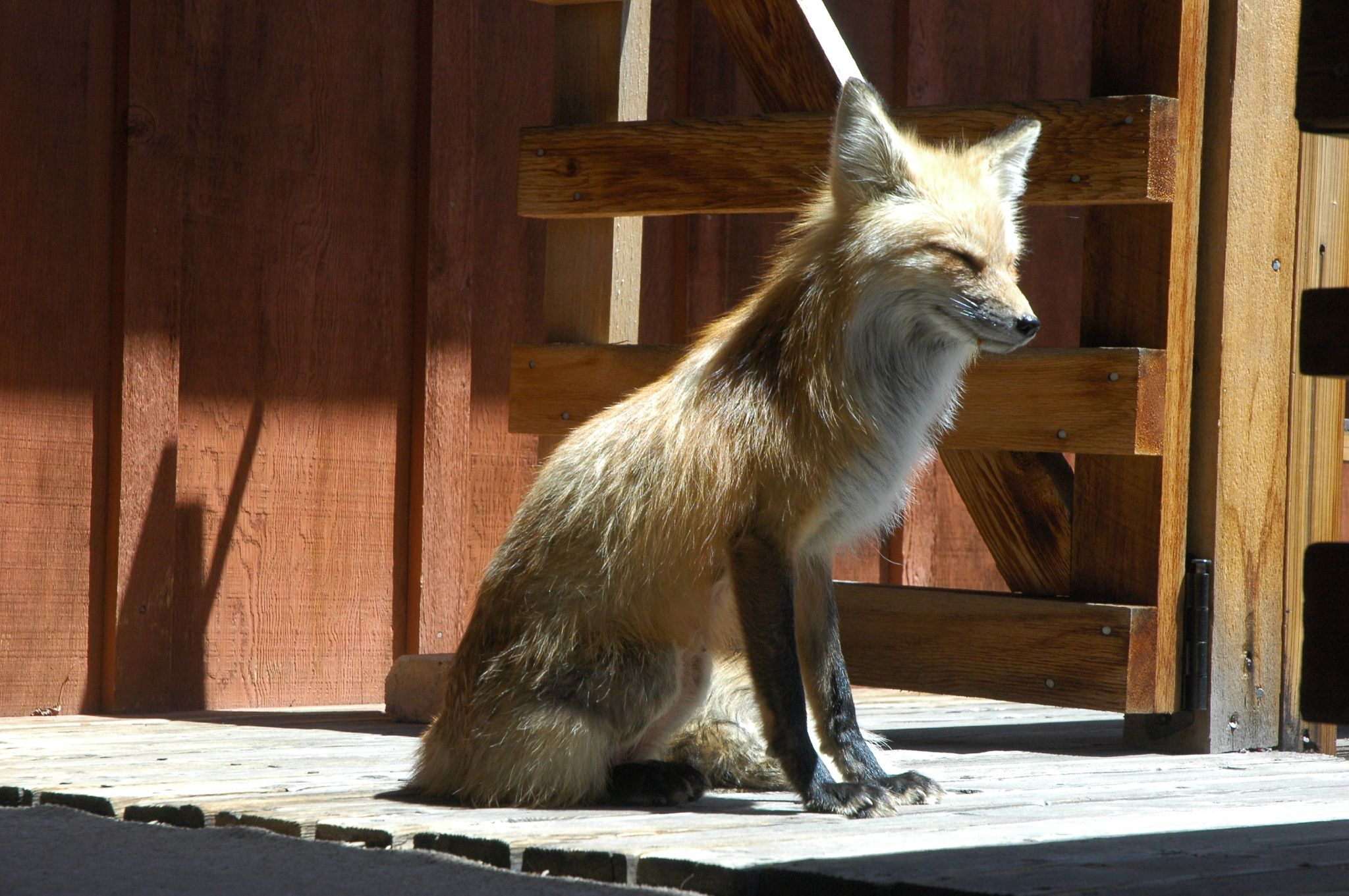
A red fox on the porch of an Evergreen home.

Evergreen Lake, a popular recreation area, was created by damming Bear Creek in 1927. It sits above downtown Evergreen, which includes a mix of historic buildings and local businesses.

In the winter, ice skating is offered at Evergreen Lake. The skating season usually runs from mid-to-late December (approximately Christmas) to late March depending upon ice thickness and weather. Evergreen Lake is the venue of the annual Skate the Lake celebration that takes place on New Year's Eve and the Evergreen Pond Hockey Championship which usually takes place in the first weekend of January.

Registered Historic Places in Evergreen include:

- Bergen Park
- Dedisse Park
- Evergreen Conference District
- Everhardt Ranch
- Fillius Park
- Hiwan Homestead
- Humphrey House
- O'Fallon Park
- Pence Park

=== Major parks ===
Evergreen Lake House in the summer

Evergreen is surrounded by thousands of acres of land in the Denver Mountain Parks and Jefferson County Open Space park systems. The Denver Mountain Parks in the area are Bergen Park, Corwina Park, Dedisse Park, Dillon Park, Fillius Park, O'Fallon Park and Pence Park in Indian Hills. The Jefferson County Open Space Parks are Alderfer/Three Sisters, Elk Meadow, Lair o' the Bear, and Mount Falcon Park in Indian Hills. Hiwan Golf Club, a country club located just east of Bergen Park, is Evergreen's only country club. Popular both in the summer and the winter, Evergreen Lake and its Lake House are recreational focal points for the region.

== Education ==
Evergreen CDP is within the Jefferson County Public Schools. Schools in the Evergreen CDP include:

- Bergen Valley Elementary School and Wilmot Elementary School
- Evergreen Middle School
- Evergreen High School

Charter schools include:

- Rocky Mountain Academy of Evergreen

Some other areas with Evergreen addresses to the south fall into the area for Conifer High School. Most students in the Evergreen area go to Evergreen Middle School. There are four elementary schools in the Evergreen area; Bergen Meadow, Bergen Valley, Wilmot, and Marshdale Elementary.

Residents with Evergreen addresses west of the Clear Creek County line are served by Clear Creek Schools with students attending King-Murphy Elementary, Clear Creek Middle School, and Clear Creek High School.

Private schools in Evergreen include Evergreen Academy, Evergreen Country Day School, Grace Christian School, and Montessori School Of Evergreen.

Charter schools in Evergreen include Rocky Mountain Academy of Evergreen. It serves students K–8th grade.

Jefferson Country school district is an open enrollment district. As long as there is sufficient space, parents can enroll a child in any Jefferson County school.

== Notable people ==
- Jeffrey Ashby, astronaut graduated from Evergreen High School in 1972
- Berkley Breathed, cartoonist, author, director, and screenwriter
- Diane Mott Davidson, author
- Nate Dern, author and comedian
- Griffin Dorsey, soccer player
- Kelly Sims Gallagher, international affairs scholar
- Joanne Greenberg, author
- Scott Hamilton, Olympic gold medal figure skater
- Gary Hart, U.S. senator and diplomat
- John Hinckley Jr., shot president Ronald Reagan, lived in Evergreen
- Noah Hoffman, Olympic cross country skier
- Kevin Kouzmanoff, MLB player graduated from Evergreen High School in 1999
- Willie Nelson, singer and songwriter owned a ranch in Evergreen for several years
- Jake Norton, Accomplished high-altitude mountaineer and guide, UN Ambassador
- Trey Parker, South Park co-creator graduated from Evergreen High School in 1988
- Jake Roper, Internet personality
- Peter Scanavino, actor
- Eric Stough, Animator and producer, Inspiration of Butters Stotch
- Phillip Yancey, American author who writes primarily about spiritual issues

== See also ==
- Front Range Urban Corridor
