= John Parish (disambiguation) =

John Parish is a British musician and producer.

John Parish may also refer to:

- John Parish (footballer) (1875–1944), Australian rules footballer
- John Carl Parish (1881–1939), American historian
- John K. Parish (1848–1932), American jurist and politician
- John Cook Parish (fl. 1926 – c. 2003), notable of the Boy Scouts of America
- John Felton Parish (1933–1982), American mass murderer, perpetrator of the 1982 Grand Prairie warehouse shootings

== See also ==
- John Parrish (disambiguation)
- John Parish Robertson (1792–1843), Scottish merchant
