= John Biddle (politician) =

American military officer and politician (1792–1859)

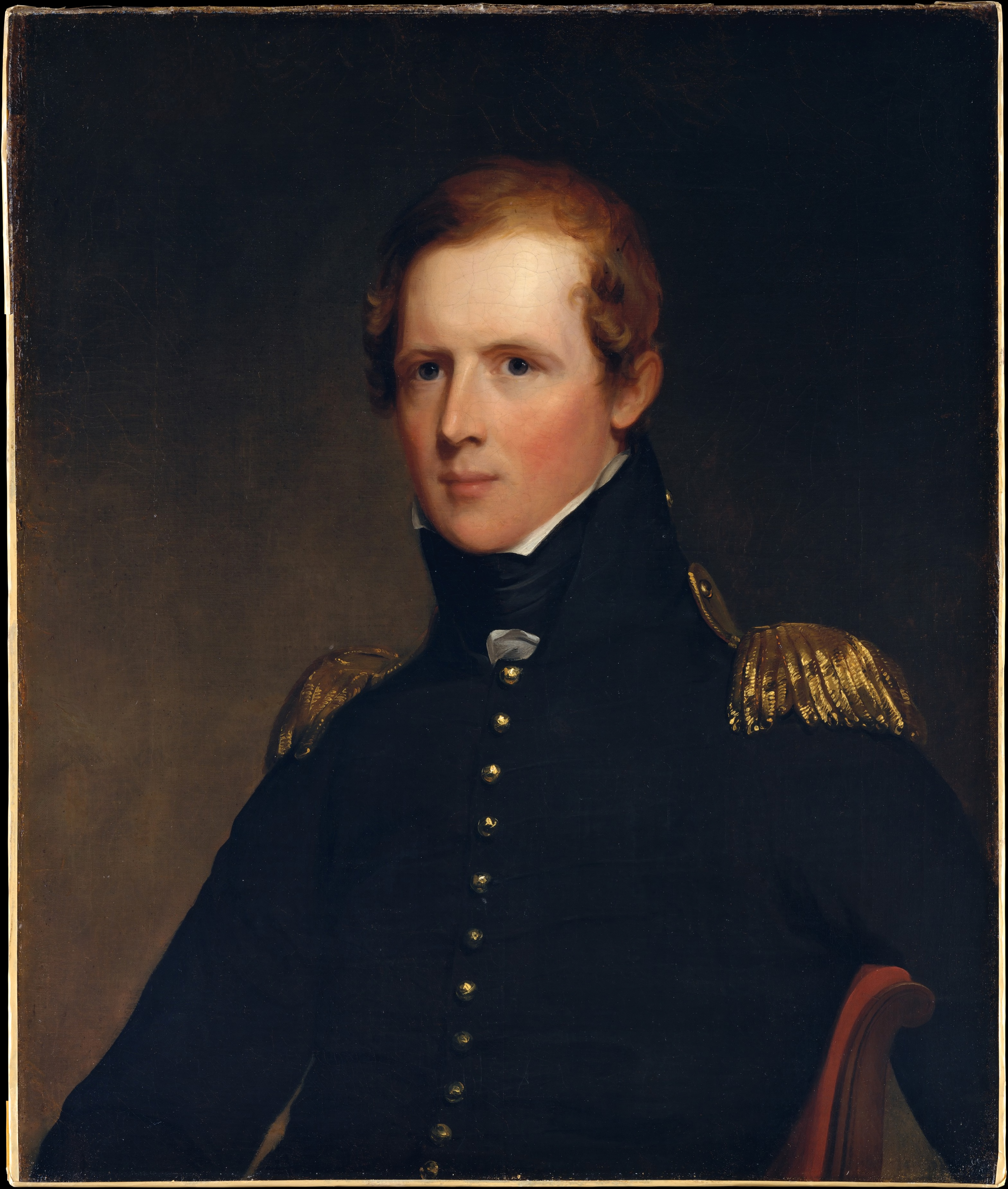
- 1818 portrait

Member of the U.S. House of Representatives from Michigan Territory's At-large district
- In office March 4, 1829 – February 21, 1831 (Delegate)
- Preceded by: Austin Eli Wing
- Succeeded by: Austin Eli Wing

4th Mayor of Detroit, Michigan
- In office 1827–1828
- Preceded by: Jonathan Kearsley
- Succeeded by: Jonathan Kearsley

Personal details
- Born: March 2, 1792 Philadelphia, Pennsylvania, US
- Died: August 25, 1859 (aged 67) White Sulphur Springs, West Virginia, US
- Spouse: Eliza Falconer Bradish
- Children: 4
- Parent(s): Charles Biddle; Hannah Shephard
- Relatives: See Biddle family
- Education: Princeton College

Military service
- Allegiance: United States
- Branch/service: United States Army
- Years of service: 1812–1821
- Rank: Major
- Battles/wars: War of 1812

John Biddle (March 2, 1792 – August 25, 1859) was an American military officer, politician, and businessman. He served as a delegate to the United States Congress from the Michigan Territory, as the speaker of the Michigan House of Representatives, and as mayor of Detroit.

== Early life ==
Part of the prominent Pennsylvania Biddle family, John Biddle was born in Philadelphia, Pennsylvania, in 1792, the son of Hannah Shephard and Charles Biddle, former Vice President of Pennsylvania, and nephew of Commodore Nicholas Biddle. He attended the common schools before entering and graduating from Princeton College.

== Career ==
At the outbreak of the War of 1812, Biddle enlisted in the U.S. Army and was appointed a second lieutenant in the Third Artillery on July 6, 1812, and promoted to first lieutenant March 13, 1813. He was attached to the staff of General Winfield Scott on the Niagara Frontier for most of the war. He became captain in the Forty-second Infantry October 1, 1813, served as assistant inspector general with the rank of major from June 19, 1817, to June 1, 1821, and commanded Fort Shelby in Detroit for some time.

After leaving the military, Biddle was appointed paymaster and Indian agent at Green Bay, Wisconsin, in 1821 and 1822. He was register of the land at Detroit in Michigan Territory, 1823–1837; commissioner for determining the ancient land claims at Detroit, Mackinaw, Sault Ste. Marie, Green Bay, and Prairie du Chien.

=== Politics and civic leadership ===
Biddle served as mayor of Detroit in 1827 and 1828. He was elected a delegate from the Territory of Michigan to the Twenty-first Congress and served from March 4, 1829, until his resignation on February 21, 1831. He was president of the convention that framed the State constitution for Michigan in 1835, even though his Whig Party was in the minority. He ran unsuccessfully as the Whig candidate for election to the United States Senate and later for Governor of Michigan. Biddle was a member of the Michigan State House of Representatives in 1841, where he represented Wayne County. He served as speaker of the state House, following the resignation of Philo C. Fuller in April 1841. He was a Trustee of the University of Michigan.

Biddle was president of the Michigan Central Railroad. He also served as the first president of Farmers’ and Mechanics’ Bank, and was a bank director from 1829 through 1838. He was also active in the civic life of Detroit, being elected vice president of the Detroit Athenaeum, active in the Association for Promoting Female Education in the City of Detroit, and vice president (1828–1837) and president (1837) of the Historical Society of Michigan.

== Personal life ==
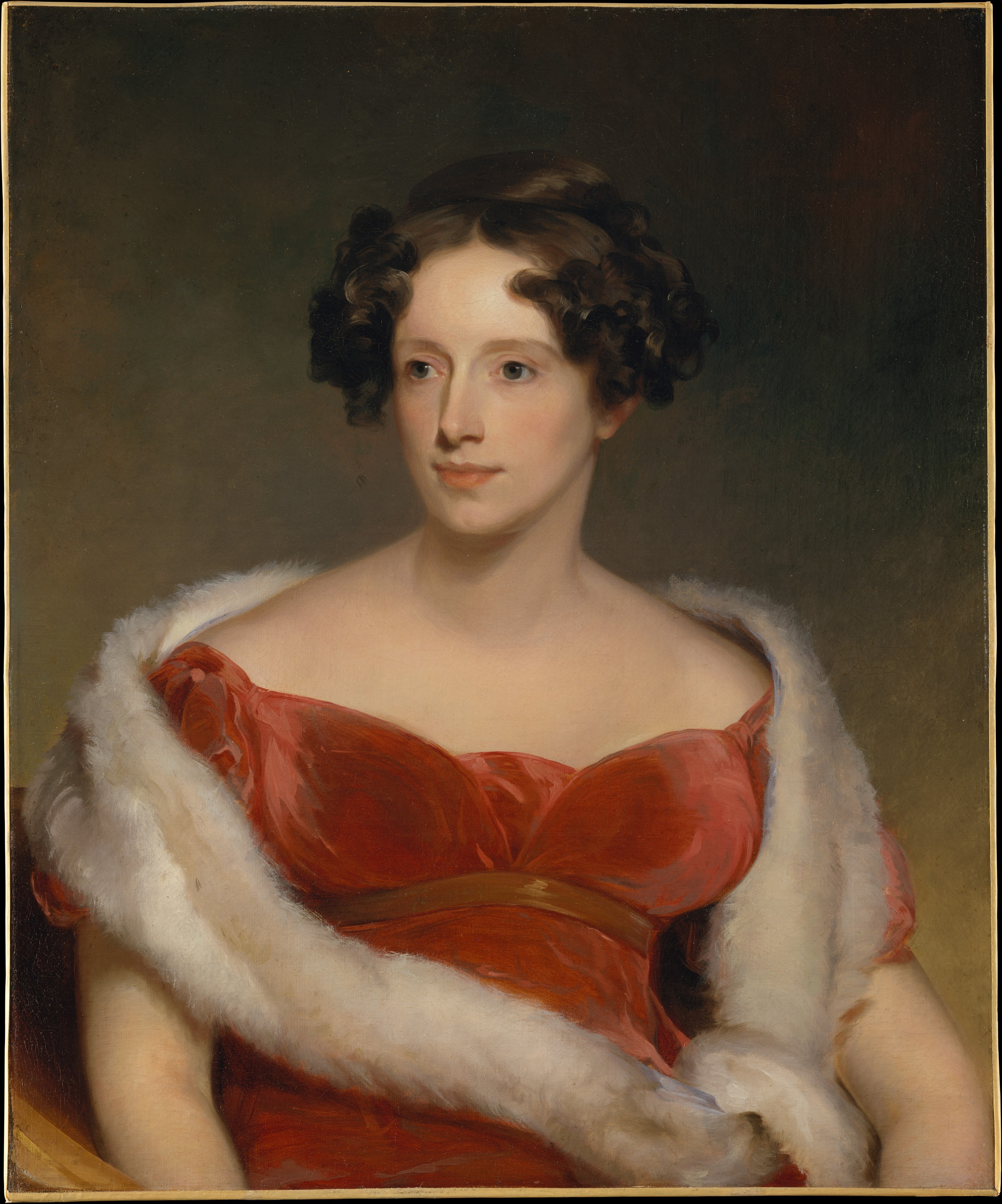
Portrait of Biddle's wife, Eliza Falconer Bradish, by Thomas Sully, 1818

On January 21, 1819, he married Eliza Falconer Bradish, the daughter of James Bradish and Margaretta Thompson of New York. The couple had four children that lived to adulthood:

- Margaretta Falconer Biddle (1825–1913), who married Andrew Porter (1820–1872), a Civil War general
- William Shepard Biddle (1830–1901), who married Susan Dayton Ogden (1831–1878), daughter of Elias B. D. Ogden, a New Jersey Supreme Court Justice
- Major James Biddle (1833–1905)
- Edward John Biddle (1836–1892)

In 1859, Biddle went to White Sulphur Springs in what is now West Virginia, for the summer, and died there. He is interred in Elmwood Cemetery, Detroit, Michigan.

=== Wyandotte ===
In 1818, Biddle acquired 1,800 acres (7.3 km^{2}) of land south of Detroit. He constructed a summer estate on the land, completed in 1835. Biddle named his estate "Wyandotte" after the Native American people who had once lived there. Biddle's home stood where the George P. MacNichol House now sits. Biddle and his family retired to the Wyandotte estate in 1836. However, Biddle was uninterested in farming the estate, and spent much time on his estate near St. Louis, Michigan. In 1853, he sold the Wyandotte estate to Eber Brock Ward of Eureka Iron & Steel Works, who developed the area into the city of Wyandotte, Michigan. Jefferson Avenue, which stretches from New Baltimore to East Rockwood, is named Biddle Avenue through Wyandotte. After selling the Wyandotte estate, Biddle and his wife returned to Philadelphia, and later the couple spent much time in Paris.

=== Descendants ===
His grandson (William Shepard Biddle's son), also named John Biddle, became Superintendent of the United States Military Academy.

Party political offices
First	Whig nominee for Governor of Michigan; 1835	Succeeded by Charles Christopher Trowbridge
Political offices
Preceded by Jonathan Kearsley	Mayor of Detroit, Michigan; 1827–1828	Succeeded by Jonathan Kearsley
U.S. House of Representatives
Preceded by Austin Eli Wing	Delegate to the U.S. House of Representatives from Michigan Territory; 1829–1831 (5th of 8)	Succeeded by Austin Eli Wing
