= Austin Eli Wing =

American politician

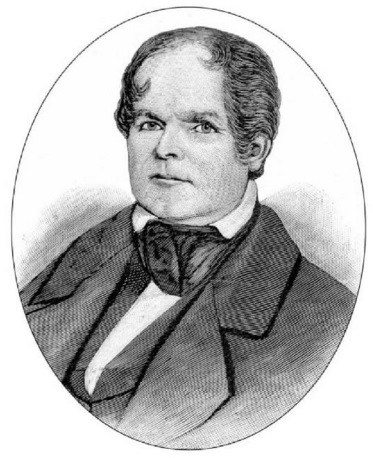
- Wing, circa 1830

Delegate to the U.S. House of Representatives from Michigan Territory's at-large district
- In office March 4, 1831 – March 3, 1833
- Preceded by: John Biddle
- Succeeded by: Lucius Lyon
- In office March 4, 1825 – March 3, 1829
- Preceded by: Gabriel Richard
- Succeeded by: John Biddle

Personal details
- Born: February 3, 1792 Conway, Massachusetts, U.S.
- Died: August 27, 1849 (aged 57) Cleveland, Ohio, U.S.
- Party: Anti-Jacksonian
- Education: Williams College

Austin Eli Wing (February 3, 1792 – August 27, 1849) was a politician in Michigan, serving as delegate to the U.S. Congress from Michigan Territory before it became the state of Michigan. Later he was elected to Congress, serving from 1825 to 1829, and from 1831 to 1833. After serving in the state house, he also served in various appointed positions.

== Life ==
Wing was born in Conway, Massachusetts, and in early youth moved with his parents to Marietta, Ohio. He attended common schools and the academy at Chillicothe and Ohio University. He graduated from Williams College, Williamstown, Massachusetts, in 1814.

He moved to Detroit, Michigan, where he became a National Republican and was elected as a delegate to the Nineteenth and Twentieth Congresses, serving from March 4, 1825, to March 3, 1829. He moved to Monroe, where he was elected to the Twenty-second Congress, serving from March 4, 1831, to March 3, 1833.

His initial election in 1826 was very close and contested in the House, and though the Elections Committee overruled state officials on some of their decisions, they still found that Wing had won the election.

Wing joined the Whig Party after its formation and became a member of the Michigan House of Representatives in 1842. He served as a member of the board of regents of the University of Michigan from 1845 until 1849. He was appointed as United States Marshal for the district of Michigan on February 24, 1846, and served until 1849.

Austin Eli Wing died in Cleveland, Ohio. He was interred in Woodland Cemetery in Monroe, Michigan.

U.S. House of Representatives
Preceded by Gabriel Richard	Delegate to the U.S. House of Representatives from Michigan Territory; 1825–1829	Succeeded by John Biddle
Preceded by John Biddle	Delegate to the U.S. House of Representatives from Michigan Territory; 1831–1833	Succeeded by Lucius Lyon
