= Great Fire of 1805 =

Fire that destroyed most of Detroit, Michigan, U.S.

- Flag of Detroit, depicting the fire (center left) and displaying the motto Speramus meliora; resurget cineribus ('We hope for better things; it will rise from the ashes')
- Date: June 11, 1805
- Location: Detroit, Michigan Territory, United States
- Type: Fire

The Great Fire of 1805 occurred on June 11, 1805, in Detroit, which was then part of the Michigan Territory of the United States. The fire destroyed the remaining vestiges of the old Fort Ponchartrain and a vast number of buildings in its vicinity. Fort Lernoult and a warehouse on the river were the only structures in Detroit that survived the conflagration.

St. Anne's Church was also completely destroyed. Father Gabriel Richard used the only remaining warehouse to hold services for the next four years until a new church was built.

The motto of the city of Detroit, Speramus meliora; resurget cineribus ('We hope for better things; it will rise from the ashes'), was written by Father Gabriel Richard after the fire.

== Development of the fire ==
The fire started on the morning of June 11, 1805. It is presumed that it started in or in the immediate vicinity of the stables of John Harvey (17??–1825), a local baker. One of the first buildings that were set alight was a nearby barn, from which the flames were able to easily spread to other flammable wooden structures. The city at the time was nowhere near its current size, being the home to only about 600 people, thus the settlement lacked adequate firefighting equipment, mainly relying on bucket brigades.

While there were no casualties from the disaster, the whole city was razed to the ground, leaving only Fort Lernoult, an old British fort on a hill above the city, and a warehouse near the river.

== Cause of the fire ==
No official cause was ever determined. However it was heavily rumored that John Harvey, while in his stable, accidentally knocked hot ashes from his pipe. As the day was hot and windy, the ashes were blown into a pile of hay, starting the fire.

== Aftermath ==
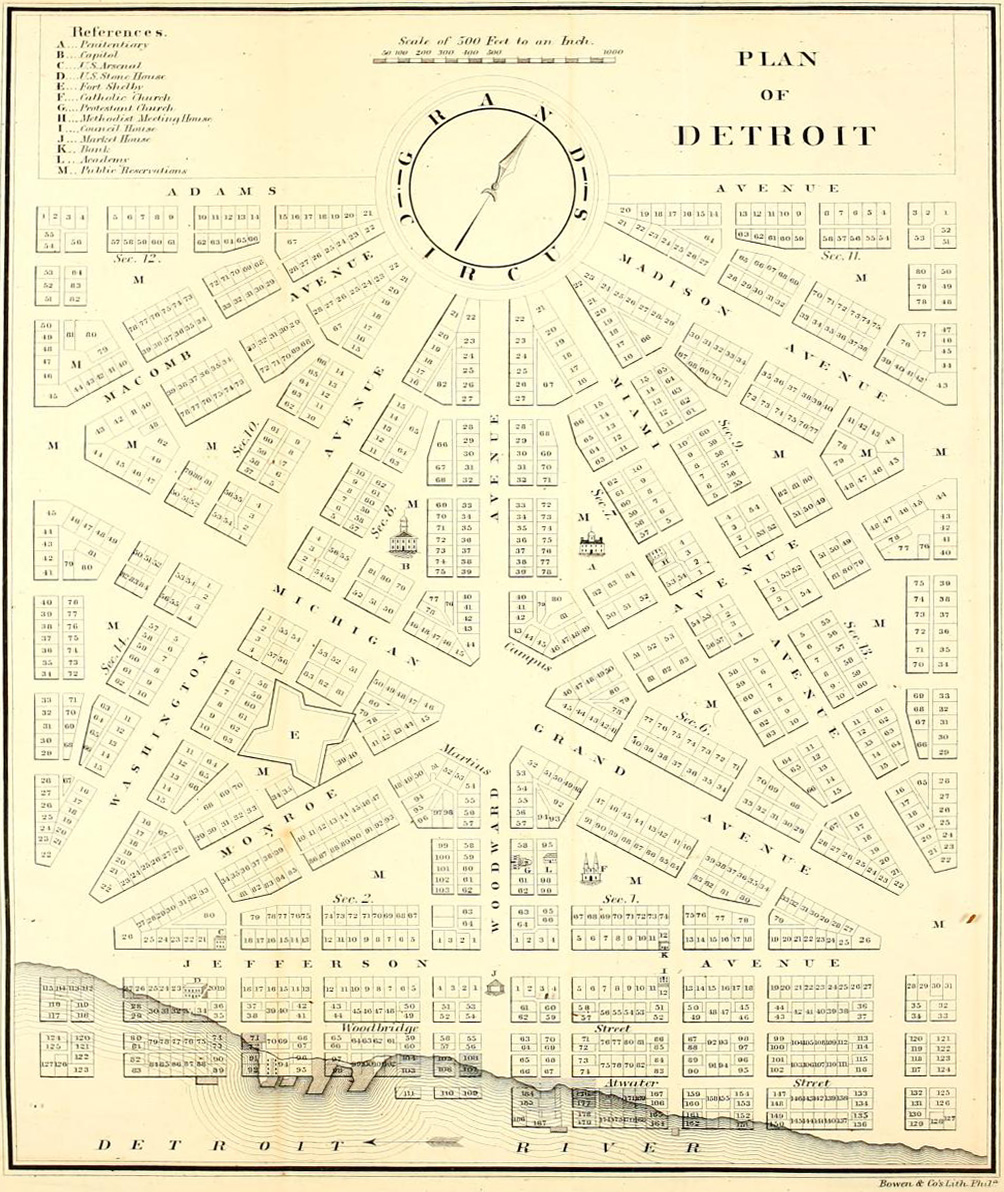

After the fire, territorial judge Augustus Woodward argued that the city was badly planned, and thus should not be rebuilt the same way. He proposed a street plan based on Paris and subsequently Washington D.C., featuring hexagon-based layout with diagonal streets radiating from the city's center. The hexagon-based proposal of Woodward proved to be too complex, however parts of his plan can be seen in the city to this day in the form of Gratiot, Michigan and Grand River Avenue.
