= Michigan Territory's at-large congressional district =

United States congressional district

- Obsolete district
- Created: 1819, as a non-voting delegate was granted by Congress
- Eliminated: 1837, as a result of statehood
- Years active: 1819–1837

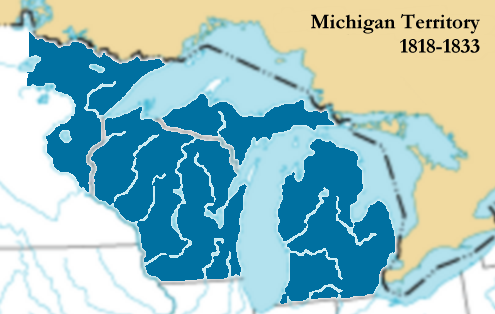
Michigan Territory between 1818 and 1833. Showing extent of the at-large congressional district for the majority of time prior to Michigan's statehood.

Michigan Territory's at-large congressional district is an obsolete congressional district that encompassed the area of the Michigan Territory prior to admitting Michigan to the Union. The territory was established on June 30, 1805, from Indiana Territory. In 1819, the territory was given the authority to elect a congressional delegate until statehood in 1837.

== List of delegates representing the district ==
Delegate	Party	Term	Cong ress	Electoral history
William Woodbridge (Detroit)	Democratic-Republican	October 28, 1819 – August 9, 1820	16th	Elected October 28, 1819 and seated March 2, 1820. Resigned due to family illness.
Vacant		August 9, 1820 – November 20, 1820	16th	
Solomon Sibley (Detroit)	Federalist	November 20, 1820 – March 3, 1823	16th 17th	Elected to finish Woodbridge's term. Re-elected in 1821. Retired.
Gabriel Richard (Detroit)	Independent	March 4, 1823 – March 3, 1825	18th	Elected in 1823. Lost re-election.
Austin Eli Wing (Detroit)	Anti-Jacksonian	March 4, 1825 – March 3, 1829	19th 20th	Elected in 1824. Re– elected in 1826. Retired.
John Biddle (Detroit)	Jacksonian	March 4, 1829 – February 21, 1831	21st	Elected in 1828. Retired and resigned before next term.
Vacant		February 21, 1831 – March 3, 1831	21st	
Austin Eli Wing (Monroe)	Anti-Jacksonian	March 4, 1831 – March 3, 1833	22nd	Elected in 1830. Retired.
Lucius Lyon (Bronson)	Jacksonian	March 4, 1833 – March 3, 1835	23rd	Elected in 1832. Retired.
George Wallace Jones (Sinsinawa Mound)	Jacksonian	March 4, 1835 – June 15, 1836	24th	Elected in 1834. Seated as the delegate from Wisconsin Territory in December 1836. Deciding a contested election in December 1838, the House Committee on Elections determined that his service as delegate from Michigan Territory ended June 15, 1836.

== See also ==
- Northwest Territory's at-large congressional district
- Illinois Territory's at-large congressional district
- Indiana Territory's at-large congressional district
- Wisconsin Territory's at-large congressional district
- Minnesota Territory's at-large congressional district
