= Pacific Historical Review =

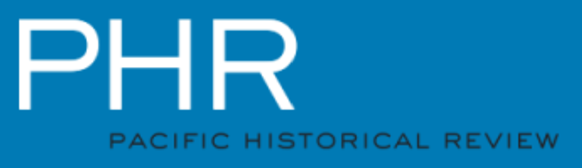
- Discipline: History
- Language: English
- Edited by: Marc Simon Rodriguez

Publication details
- History: 1932-present
- Publisher: University of California Press on behalf of The Pacific Coast Branch, American Historical Association (United States)
- Frequency: Quarterly

Standard abbreviations
- ISO 4: Pac. Hist. Rev.

Indexing
- ISSN: 0030-8684 (print); 1533-8584 (web)
- JSTOR: 00308684
- OCLC no.: 1645286

Links
- Journal homepage

The Pacific Historical Review is the official publication of the Pacific Coast Branch of the American Historical Association. It is a quarterly academic journal published by University of California Press. It was established in 1932 under founding editor-in-chief John Carl Parish. The journal covers the history of American expansion to the Pacific and beyond, as well as the post-frontier developments of the 20th-century American West. Every issue also features an extensive section devoted to book reviews plus frequent review essays. The current editor is Marc Simon Rodriguez (Portland State University). Past editors included John C. Parrish (1932—1936), Louis Knott Koontz (1936—1947), John Caughey (1947—1968), Norris Hundley, Jr. (1968—1996), David A. Johnson, Carl Abbott, and Susan Wladaver-Morgan (1997—2014).
