= Wisconsin Territory's at-large congressional district =

Coordinates: 44°45′N 90°00′W

- Obsolete district
- Created: 1836, as a non-voting delegate was granted by Congress
- Eliminated: 1849, after statehood was achieved
- Years active: 1836–1849

Wisconsin Territory had a non-voting delegate to the United States House of Representatives.

== List of delegates representing the district ==
Delegate	Party	Years	Cong ress	Electoral history
District established July 3, 1836
Vacant		July 3, 1836 – January 26, 1837	24th	
George Wallace Jones (Sinsinawa Mound)	Jacksonian	January 26, 1837 – March 3, 1837	24th 25th	Redistricted from the Michigan Territory and re-elected in 1836. Election invalidated.
George Wallace Jones (Sinsinawa Mound)	Democratic	March 4, 1837 – January 14, 1839	24th 25th	Redistricted from the Michigan Territory and re-elected in 1836. Election invalidated.
James D. Doty (Ashton)	Democratic	January 14, 1839 – March 3, 1841	25th 26th	Elected in 1838. Retired.
Henry Dodge (Dodgeville)	Democratic	March 4, 1841 – March 3, 1845	27th 28th	Elected in 1840. Re-elected in 1842. Retired to become Governor of Wisconsin Territory.
Morgan L. Martin (Green Bay)	Democratic	March 4, 1845 – March 3, 1847	29th	Elected in 1844. Lost re-election.
John H. Tweedy (Milwaukee)	Whig	March 4, 1847 – May 28, 1848	30th	Elected in 1846. Resigned.
Vacant		May 29, 1848 – October 29, 1848	30th	
Henry H. Sibley (Mendota)	Democratic	October 30, 1848 – March 3, 1849	30th	Elected to finish Tweedy's term. Redistricted to the Minnesota Territory.
District dissolved March 3, 1849

The district was eliminated with the creation of the Minnesota Territory on March 2, 1849, as Wisconsin was admitted into the union as a state. However, Henry Sibley continued to serve out his term as the Delegate from the Territory of Wisconsin until March 3, 1849, making the district's effective elimination on March 3, 1849, the conclusion of the Congress.

Three congressional districts were established when Wisconsin was granted statehood, and it remains the only U.S. state to never have been represented by an at-large congressional district as a state.

== See also ==
- Wisconsin's congressional districts
- Northwest Territory's at-large congressional district
- Illinois Territory's at-large congressional district
- Michigan Territory's at-large congressional district
- List of United States congressional districts
