= Lucius Lyon =

American politician (1800–1851)

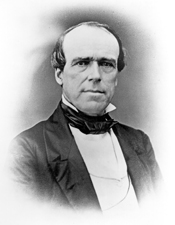

Member of the U.S. House of Representatives from Michigan's 2nd district
- In office March 4, 1843 – March 3, 1845
- Preceded by: Constituency established
- Succeeded by: John S. Chipman

United States Senator from Michigan
- In office January 26, 1837 – March 3, 1839
- Preceded by: Himself (Shadow Senator)
- Succeeded by: Augustus S. Porter

United States Shadow Senator from the Michigan Territory
- In office November 10, 1835 – January 26, 1837
- Preceded by: Seat established
- Succeeded by: Himself (U.S. Senator)

Delegate to the U.S. House of Representatives from Michigan Territory's at-large district
- In office March 4, 1833 – March 3, 1835
- Preceded by: Austin Eli Wing
- Succeeded by: George Jones

Personal details
- Born: February 26, 1800 Shelburne, Vermont, U.S.
- Died: September 24, 1851 (aged 51) Detroit, Michigan, U.S.
- Party: Democratic

Lucius Lyon (February 26, 1800 – September 24, 1851) was a U.S. statesman from the state of Michigan. Along with Louis Campau, Lucius Lyon is remembered as one of the founding fathers of Grand Rapids, Michigan, the state's second-largest city. A Democrat, he served as a Delegate to the U.S. House from Michigan Territory (1833–1835), a U.S. Senator from Michigan (1837–1839), and a member of the U.S. House of Representatives from Michigan's second congressional district (1843–1845).

== Early life ==
Lyon was born in Shelburne, Vermont, on February 26, 1800, a son of Asa Lyon and Sarah (Atwater) Lyon. He received a common school education in Shelburne and then worked with his father on the family farm. At age 18, Lyon began attendance at academies in Shelburne and Burlington, and he taught school in between academy terms. He studied engineering and surveying with John Johnson of Burlington, and moved to Detroit, Michigan Territory, in 1821. Lyon initially worked in Michigan as a teacher, then took up surveying, and was eventually appointed Deputy Surveyor General of Michigan Territory.

== Early career ==
During the summers of the mid-1820s, Lyon surveyed areas that are now parts of Michigan, Illinois, Wisconsin, and Iowa. In the winters, he often visited family in Vermont and studied scientific subjects including geology at Middlebury College. These studies enabled him to develop superior knowledge of Michigan Territory, including land and lakes, flora and fauna, and natural resources. In 1829, he was commissioned to rebuild the Fort Gratiot Lighthouse at the entrance to the St. Clair River from Lake Huron. In the 1830s, he surveyed a portion of what would become the boundary between Illinois and Wisconsin. Lyon placed the initial point of the Fourth Principal Meridian on December 10, 1831. He also participated in the survey parties which established the baseline and meridian used to define townships in Wisconsin. His field notebooks recorded considerable detail about the land he surveyed, providing a rich source of information for later researchers.

When Michigan applied for statehood in the 1830s, action was delayed in Congress because Ohio objected to surrendering the Toledo Strip, which resulted in a conflict known as the Toledo War. Lyon's detailed knowledge of Michigan's geography enabled him to make a persuasive argument to residents of Michigan that accepting the Upper Peninsula in lieu of the Toledo Strip was an equitable solution. The compromise caused Ohio to withdraw its objections to Michigan statehood, and Michigan joined the Union in 1837.

== Continued career ==
Lyon was elected as a non-voting Delegate to the U.S. Congress for the Michigan Territory, serving from 1833 to 1835. On December 11, 1833, he presented a formal petition to Congress requesting Michigan's admission into the Union. Congress delayed consideration of statehood, in part due to a dispute with Ohio over the Toledo Strip and also in part due to opposition from southern states to admit another free state.

From May 11 to June 24, 1835, he was a member of the convention that drafted the first Michigan Constitution, which voters adopted in October, 1835. In November 1835, Lyon was elected as U.S. Senator. However Michigan's delegation to Congress was seated as "spectators", pending Michigan's admission as a state. Upon Michigan's admission as a state on January 26, 1837, Lyon served as a full U.S. Senator until 1839.

On March 28, 1836, Lyon was a witness to the Treaty of Washington of 1836, in which the Ottawa and Chippewa nations of Indians ceded much of the land in the northern portion of the Lower Peninsula of Michigan. He was also witness to a separate treaty on May 9, 1836, with the Chippewa in which additional land was ceded.

He did not run for reelection in 1839 and moved to Grand Rapids, Michigan. He was a member of the Board of Regents of the University of Michigan from 1837 to 1839, and was appointed Indian commissioner at La Pointe, Wisconsin, in 1839. He was elected as a Democrat from the newly formed 2nd district in Michigan to the 28th Congress, serving one term from March 4, 1843, to March 3, 1845. He was the first person to represent Michigan in both the U.S. Senate and U.S. House. In both houses of Congress he served on the Committee on Public Lands. He did not run for reelection to the U.S. House in 1844.

== Later career ==
After leaving Congress, Lyon was appointed by President James K. Polk as U.S. Surveyor General for Ohio, Indiana, and Michigan. He moved the office for this post from Cincinnati, Ohio, to Detroit, Michigan, and served from 1845 to 1850.

Lyon was also a major financial backer of Hiram Moore, an inventor and a founder of the village of Climax, Michigan. Moore reportedly invented a working farm machine in the 1830s and 1840s that "combined" the functions of a threshing machine and a reaper, decades before combines were commonly available. Moore's designs were allegedly copied by Cyrus McCormick and despite many years of legal wrangling, Moore was unsuccessful in pursuing his patent claims.

He also owned a large tract of land in Grand Rapids, Michigan, and engaged in a feud over platting the area with the other major land owner, Louis Campau. Lyon wanted to call it the village of Kent rather than Grand Rapids. Lyon is also remembered in Grand Rapids for attempting to commercialize salt deposits in the city by boring a hole and extracting salt from the brine water below.

Lyon professed the Swedenborgian religious faith and was an active advocate for temperance until he later became affiliated with the Washingtonian movement, which advocated the total abstinence from consuming alcohol.

== Death and burial ==
Lyon never married, and had no children. He died at the Detroit home of his nephew George W. Thayer on September 24, 1851. Lyon was buried at Elmwood Cemetery in Detroit.

== Legacy ==
The Michigan locales South Lyon; Lyon Township, Oakland County; Lyon Township, Roscommon County; Lyon Lake; and Lyons Township are all named after Lyon. Notably, in 1836, Lucius Lyon purchased much of the property in a small village in Ionia County, Michigan, and renamed it Lyons. He platted the village, established the first post office and installed his brother, Truman, as the first postmaster, although he never lived in the village.

Lyon Street and Lyon Square, both located in downtown Grand Rapids, Michigan, are named after him. In 2008, city leaders erected a bronze statue of Lyon's likeness downtown, as part of a "Community Legends" initiative intended to pay tribute to pivotal figures in Grand Rapids history.

U.S. House of Representatives
Preceded by Austin Eli Wing	Delegate to the U.S. House of Representatives from Michigan Territory's at-large congressional district 1833–1835	Succeeded by George Jones
New constituency	Member of the U.S. House of Representatives from Michigan's 2nd congressional district 1843–1845	Succeeded by John S. Chipman
U.S. Senate
New seat	U.S. Shadow Senator (Class 1) from the Michigan Territory; 1835–1837; Served alongside: John Norvell	Succeeded by Himself as U.S. Senator
Preceded by Himself as Shadow Senator	U.S. Senator (Class 1) from Michigan; 1837–1839; Served alongside: John Norvell	Succeeded by Augustus S. Porter
