= Lyon Lake =

Lake in the state of Michigan, United States

- Location within Michigan
- Location: Fredonia Township, Calhoun County, Michigan
- Coordinates: 42°11′19″N 84°58′00″W
- Type: Lake
- Basin countries: United States
- Max. length: 3/4 mi (1.2 km)
- Max. width: 1/4 mi (0.40 km)
- Surface area: 125 acres (51 ha)
- Surface elevation: 938 ft (286 m)

Lyon Lake is a small, natural lake in Fredonia Township, Calhoun County, Michigan. The lake is approximately 3/4 mi (1.2 km) long and 1/4 mi (0.40 km) wide (125 acres (51 ha)). The lake is part of a small cluster of lakes 6 mi (9.7 km) south of the historic village of Marshall, Michigan. The other lakes are Fish Lake, Pine Lake and Long Lake.

Lyon Lake is surrounded by predominantly modest residential homes that are the primary residences of the homeowners. The southern shore of the lake is adjacent to the Marshall Country Club, which is a private golf course.

Lyon Lake is named after Lucius Lyon, who was a prominent land surveyor in the Michigan Territory in the early 1830s and among the most influential men in the process of establishing statehood. Lucius Lyon served Michigan as both U.S. Senator and U.S. House Representative.

== See also ==
- List of lakes in Michigan
