= John Parrish =

John Parrish may refer to:

- John Parrish (baseball) (born 1977), American baseball player
- John W. Parrish (born 1939), American academic

== See also ==
- John Parish (disambiguation)
