= Basilica of Sainte Anne de Détroit =

Historic church in Michigan, United States

- Ste. Anne Roman Catholic Church Complex
- U.S. National Register of Historic Places
- Michigan State Historic Site
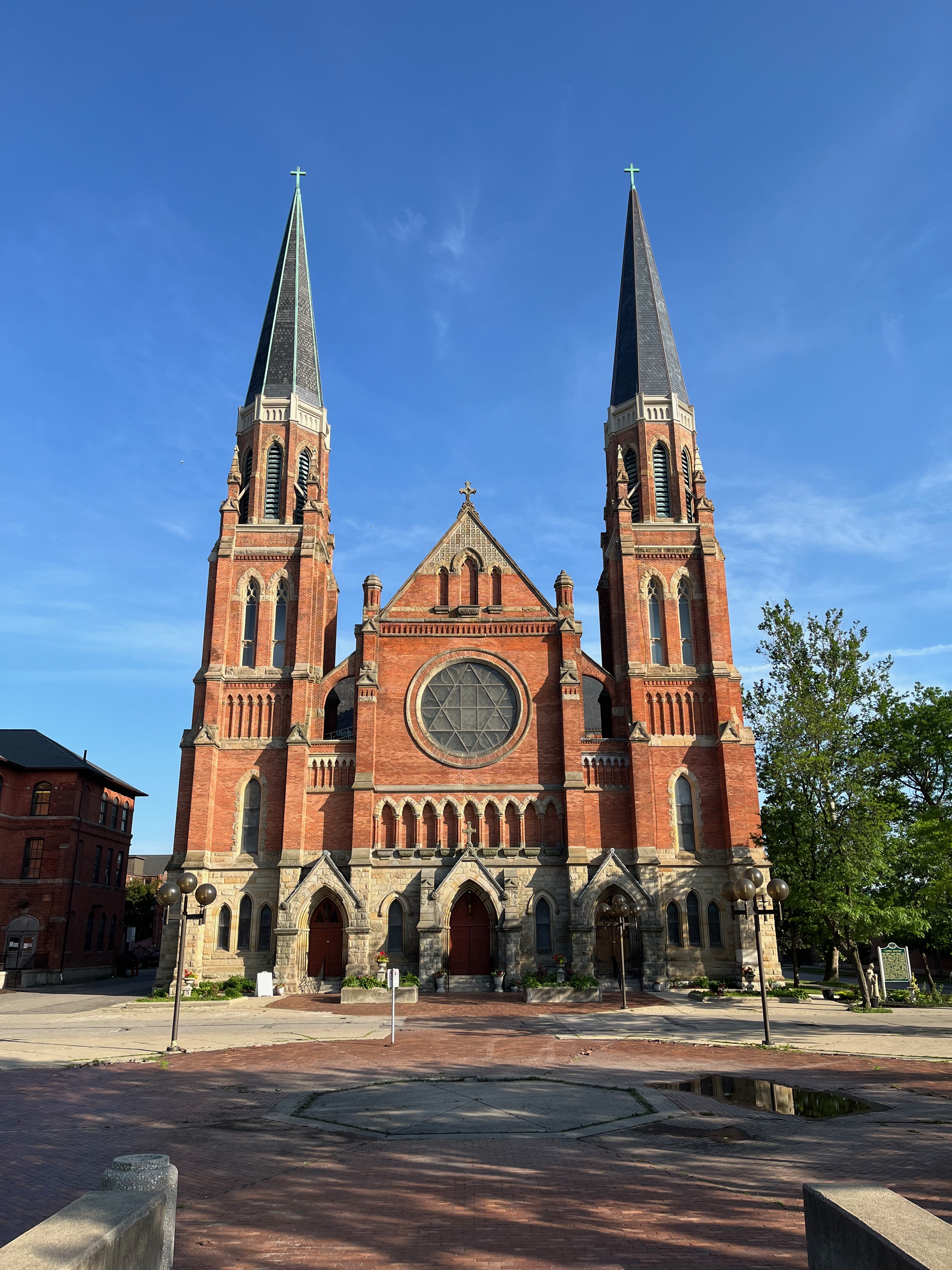
- Basilica of Sainte Anne de Détroit in 2025
- Interactive map
- Location: 1000 St. Anne Street; Detroit, Michigan
- Coordinates: 42°19′15″N 83°04′36″W
- Built: 1886–1887
- Architect: Albert E. French
- Architectural style: Classical Revival, Late Gothic Revival
- NRHP reference No.: 76001040
- Added to NRHP: June 03, 1976

Basilica of Sainte Anne de Détroit (Sainte-Anne-de-Détroit) was founded July 26, 1701 by French colonists in New France, and is the second-oldest continuously operating Roman Catholic parish in the United States. The current Gothic Revival cathedral-styled church, built in 1886, is located at 1000 St. Anne Street in Detroit, Michigan, in the Hubbard-Richard neighborhood, near the Ambassador Bridge, and the Michigan Central Station. At one time it was the seat of a diocese that included French (and later British) territory in Ontario, Canada south of the Detroit River.

Historically, the parish congregation has occupied eight different buildings. It was listed on the National Register of Historic Places in 1976. The main entry to the church faces a grand tree-lined, brick paved plaza. Reflecting demographic changes in the city and region since the 1930s, the present parish is largely Latino in population. On March 1, 2020, Pope Francis elevated the church to a minor basilica, the 86th such designation in the United States and the third in Michigan.

== History ==
Ste. Anne's church was the first building constructed in Fort Pontchartrain du Détroit. The vicinity developed as the city of Detroit. Cadillac and a party of French colonists arrived at the bank of the Detroit River on July 24, 1701. They began construction of a church on July 26, 1701, the feast day of Saint Anne (sainte Anne). The parish was founded and named by the settlers in honor of the patron of France, Saint Anne, mother of Mary and grandmother of Jesus. Nicholas Constantine del Halle, a Franciscan, and François Vaillant, a Jesuit, were the two priests who accompanied the group. Vaillant returned east to Quebec in the fall.

Local Native Americans set the church on fire in 1703; this destroyed part of the fort including the church, the rectory, and the baptismal records. A new church building was built in 1704. The oldest surviving church records date to this time, with the first record on February 2, 1704, being the baptism of a child born to Cadillac. Father del Halle was kidnapped by local Native Americans, likely the historic Ojibwe of the area. After his release, as he walked back to the fort, he was shot and killed by an Indian. His remains were buried under the altar of Ste. Anne's; they have been moved four times since to the succeeding new church buildings.

Father Chérubin Deniau was assigned to the parish and began work on a larger church in 1708. This church was outside the fort's palisade. It was burned in 1714 by settlers during a Fox attack, as they feared it would offer cover to the attackers. The parish did not have a church building for many years after this.

One may have been built by Father Bonaventure Liénard, who was priest here for more than three decades, between 1722 and 1754. Father Simple Bocquet is known to have begun construction of a new church building in 1755, within a year after he arrived. Bocquet served here for nearly 30 years; in 1763 Detroit was part of the French territory east of the Mississippi River ceded to British rule after the latter's victory in the Seven Years' War. After the American Revolutionary War and establishment of independence, the territory came under United States rule in the early 1800s. An Anglican wedding was recorded in the parish records during this period.

Father Gabriel Richard was called to Ste. Anne's in 1796. He helped start the school that eventually developed as the University of Michigan, started primary schools for white boys and girls as well as for Indians, and was elected as a territorial representative to the U.S. Congress. He helped initiate a road-building project that connected Detroit and Chicago. He also brought the first printing press to Detroit and started The Observer, the Michigan Territory's first newspaper. After his death in 1832, Father Richard was interred under the altar of Ste. Anne's.

In 1805, most of Detroit, including the church, was destroyed in an accidental fire. A new church building was not begun until 1818, and it was not completed until 1828. This church was built at a new location outside the grounds of the old fort but still near the Detroit River, which travelers and traders used. In 1833, Ste. Anne's was designated as the cathedral for the new Roman Catholic diocese of Detroit it served in this role until 1848. That year coadjutor bishop Peter Paul Lefevre moved the bishop's throne to St. Peter's Cathedral, today's Saints Peter and Paul Church. Around that time, the old St-Anne's parish registers were stolen. Because of this priceless loss, parish registers are no longer allowed to be freely and easily accessed by the public. Because the registers contain precious information about the founders and history of Detroit and Michigan, researchers have worked to make copies available through digital reproduction in the public domain.

In 1817, many of the remains in the old cemetery were moved to the churchyard of the new Ste. Anne's. In the 1860s, many were moved again to Mount Elliott Cemetery, including the remains of Colonel Jean François Hamtramck. In the 1860s, the 1818 church building was demolished. Furnishings and even the cornerstone were split between the new Ste. Anne's and the new parish of St. Joachim, named after Ste. Anne's husband.

== Architecture ==
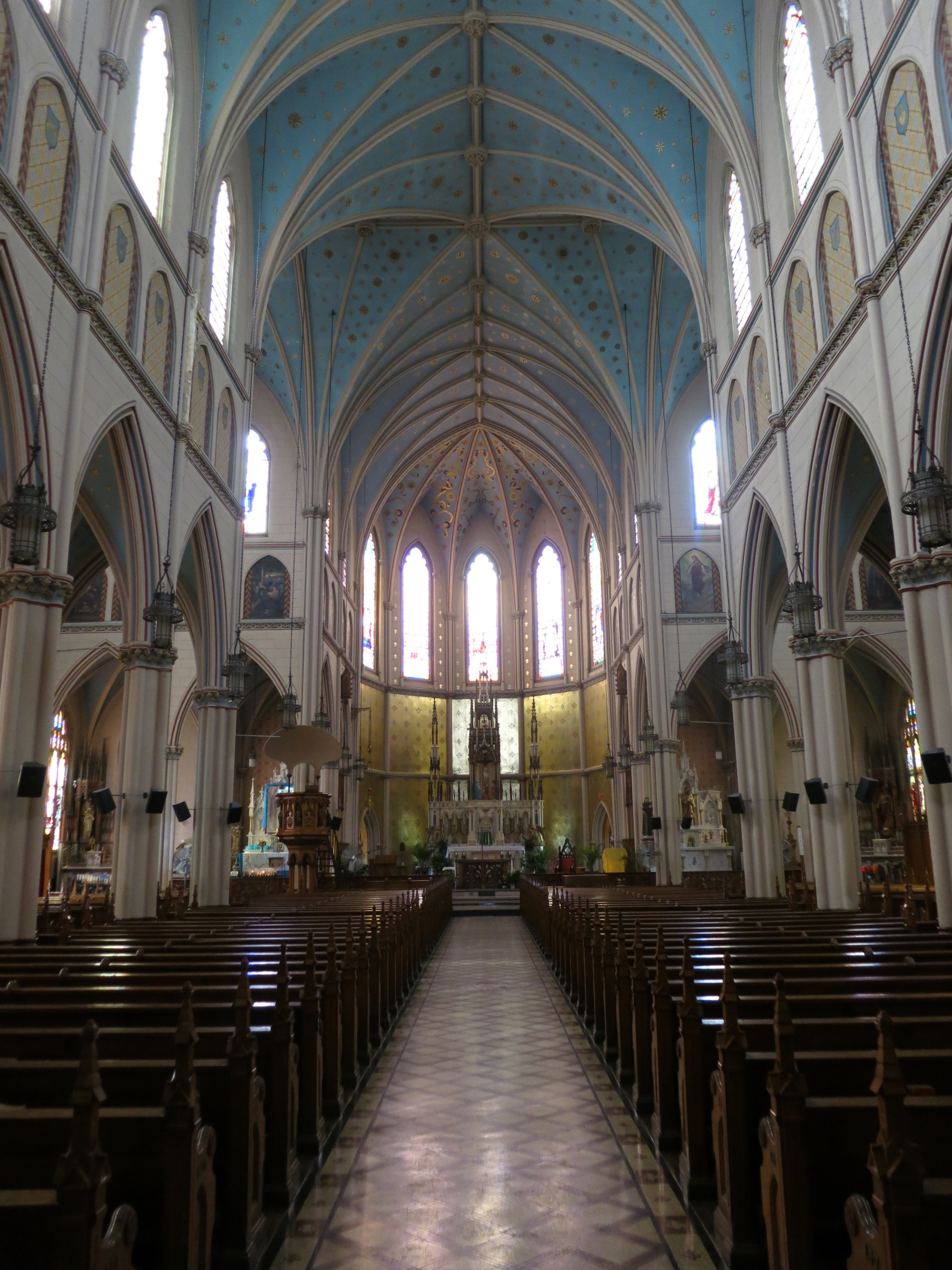
The church nave

The church design has been attributed to architect Leon Cocquard (27 September 1860 – 26 April 1923), who at the time was draftsman for Albert E. French (3 March 1848, Prince Edward Island – 1 November 1927), and whose success led to further ecclesiastical commissions in the French Gothic style. Parish records, Detroit building permit number 23, and the final report for the Ste. Anne historic district list Albert E. French as the architect of ultimate responsibility for Ste. Anne de Détroit Catholic Church (1886–1887). French designed the church in the Gothic Revival style with flying buttresses, expressing the French history of the parish and territory. The church faces a landscaped grand brick plaza, and the main entrance on the north facade includes four gargoyles. Ste. Anne's displays the oldest stained glass in the city of Detroit. Ste. Anne's is listed on the National Register of Historic Places.

The 1818 church altar and Father Richard's remains are installed in a side chapel of the present church. Other elements from the 1818 church include the communion rail, a statue of Ste. Anne, and the church bell.

Both Ste. Anne and St. Joachim parishes continued French traditions. By the 1920s, increased immigration from the 19th century and other demographic changes resulted in Ste. Anne's having a predominately ethnic Irish-American congregation. Since the late 1930s, its population has become primarily Hispanic. At that time, most Hispanic parishioners were immigrants from Mexico and Puerto Rico. The first sermon in Spanish was given in 1940; the last sermon in French in 1942. A Spanish-speaking priest was assigned in 1946. The parish remains largely Hispanic, more recently bolstered by immigration from Central and South American nations.

== See also ==
- List of Catholic cathedrals in the United States
- List of cathedrals in the United States
- Ste. Anne's Parish Complex Historic District
