= 1835 Michigan gubernatorial election =

- October 5, 1835
- Turnout: 29.32%
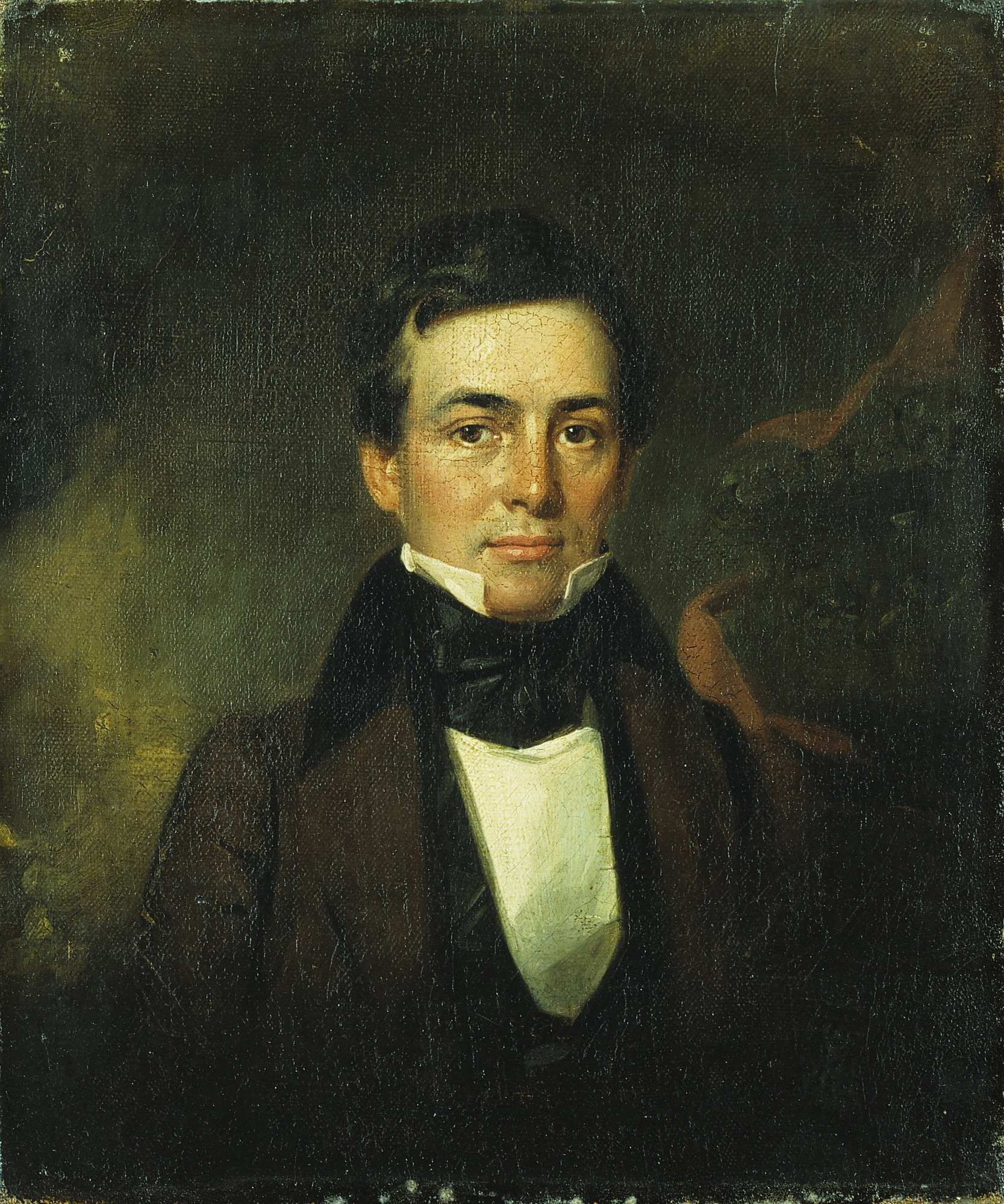

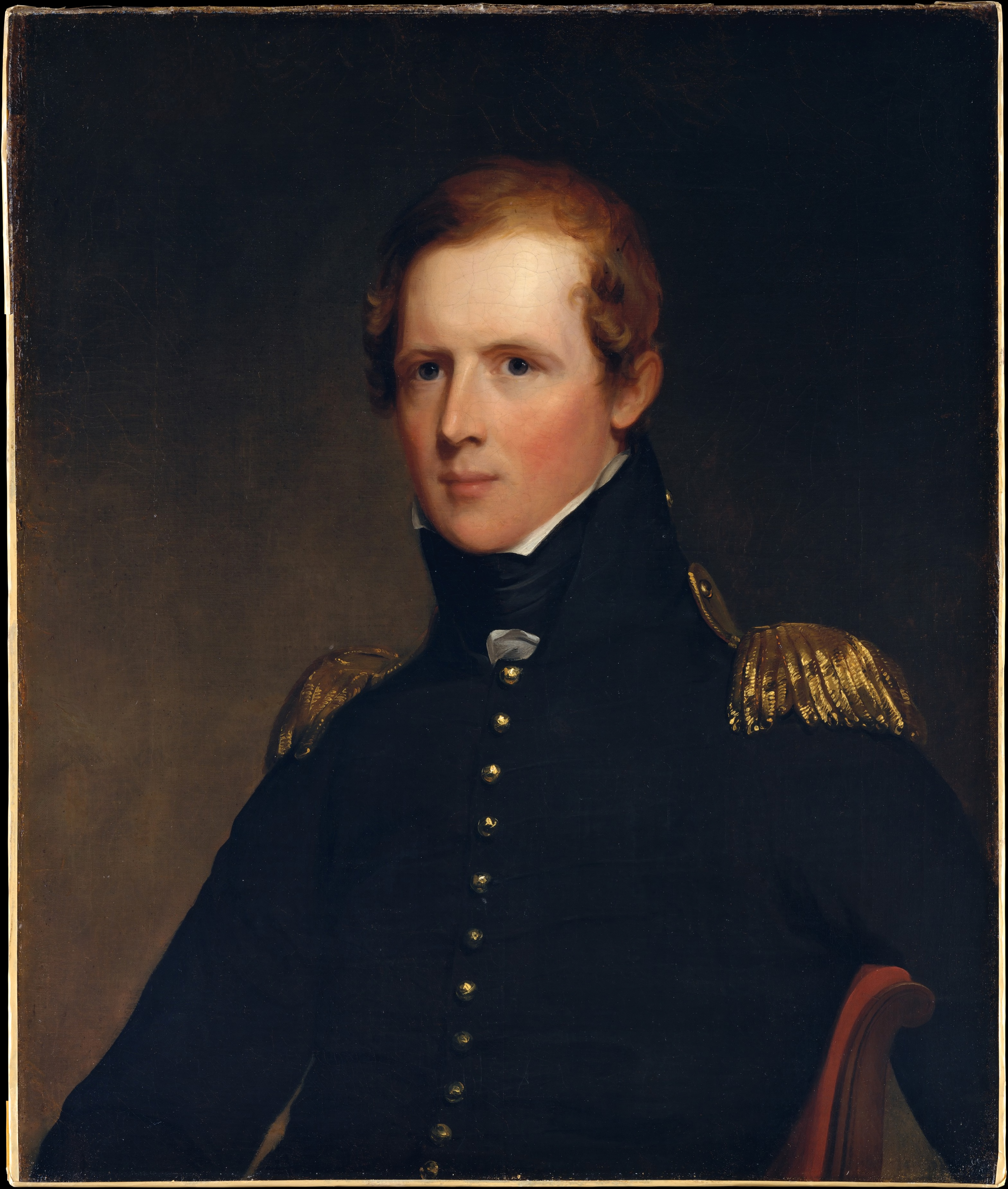
Nominee	Stevens T. Mason	John Biddle
Party	Democratic	Whig
Popular vote	8,461	814
Percentage	90.31%	8.69%
- County results Mason: 60–70% 80–90% 90–100% No Data/Votes
Governor before election
John S. Horner
as Territorial Governor
Elected Governor
Stevens T. Mason
Democratic

The 1835 Michigan gubernatorial election was held on October 5, 1835. Democratic nominee Stevens T. Mason defeated Whig nominee John Biddle with 90.31% of the vote. This was the first state election for the Governor of Michigan; in addition to electing a governor (and lieutenant governor), Michigan also elected a prospective congressman and approved a state constitution. However, due to an ongoing territorial dispute with Ohio, Michigan's admission to the Union was delayed until January 26, 1837.

== General election ==
=== Candidates ===
Major party candidates

- Stevens T. Mason, Democratic
- John Biddle, Whig

=== Results ===
1835 Michigan gubernatorial election
Party	Candidate	Votes	%
Democratic	Stevens T. Mason	8,461	90.31%
Whig	John Biddle	814	8.69%
	Scattering	94	1.00%
Majority		7,647	81.62%
Total votes		9,369	100.00%
Democratic hold			

==== Results by county ====
County	Stevens T. Mason Democratic		John Biddle Whig		Scattering Write-in		Margin		Total votes cast
County	#	%	#	%	#	%	#	%	Total votes cast
Allegan	67	100.00%	0	0.00%	0	0.00%	67	100.00%	67
Berrien	308	99.35%	0	0.00%	2	0.65%	306	98.71%	310
Branch	77	100.00%	0	0.00%	0	0.00%	77	100.00%	77
Calhoun	241	96.79%	0	0.00%	8	3.21%	233	93.57%	249
Cass	356	83.96%	64	15.09%	4	0.94%	292	68.87%	424
Chippewa	53	100.00%	0	0.00%	0	0.00%	53	100.00%	53
Clinton (Note: Includes Kent, Ionia, and Ottawa counties.)	1,026	98.37%	2	0.19%	15	1.44%	1,011	96.93%	1,043
Hillsdale	105	93.75%	7	6.25%	0	0.00%	98	87.50%	112
Jackson	274	95.47%	6	2.09%	7	2.44%	267	93.03%	287
Kalamazoo	431	94.10%	24	5.24%	3	0.66%	407	88.86%	458
Lapeer	89	87.25%	13	12.75%	0	0.00%	76	74.51%	102
Lenawee	456	94.21%	14	2.89%	14	2.89%	442	91.32%	484
Mackinac	112	100.00%	0	0.00%	0	0.00%	112	100.00%	112
Macomb	455	91.55%	41	8.25%	1	0.20%	414	83.30%	497
Monroe	432	99.54%	1	0.23%	1	0.23%	431	99.31%	434
Oakland	942	63.69%	536	36.24%	1	0.07%	406	27.45%	1,479
Saginaw	100	100.00%	0	0.00%	0	0.00%	100	100.00%	100
St. Clair	166	95.95%	4	2.31%	3	1.73%	162	93.64%	173
St. Joseph	207	96.28%	1	0.47%	7	3.26%	200	93.02%	215
Washtenaw	1,074	100.00%	0	0.00%	0	0.00%	1,074	100.00%	1,074
Wayne	1,490	92.03%	101	6.24%	28	1.73%	1,389	85.79%	1,619
Total	8,461	90.31%	814	8.69%	94	1.00%	7,647	81.62%	9,369
