= George Wallace Jones =

United States Minister to New Granada from 1859 to 1861

George Jones
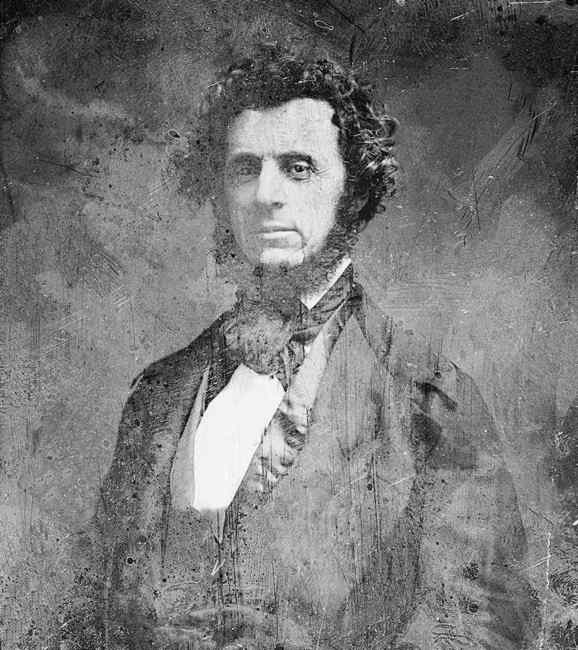

United States Minister to New Granada
- In office August 29, 1859 – November 4, 1861
- President: James Buchanan; Abraham Lincoln
- Preceded by: James B. Bowlin
- Succeeded by: Allan Burton (Colombia)

United States Senator from Iowa
- In office December 7, 1848 – March 3, 1859
- Preceded by: Seat established
- Succeeded by: James W. Grimes

Delegate to the U.S. House of Representatives from the Wisconsin Territory's at-large district
- In office December 5, 1836 – January 3, 1839
- Preceded by: Constituency established
- Succeeded by: James D. Doty

Delegate to the U.S. House of Representatives from the Michigan Territory's at-large district
- In office March 4, 1835 – June 15, 1836
- Preceded by: Lucius Lyon
- Succeeded by: Constituency abolished

Personal details
- Born: April 12, 1804 Vincennes, Indiana, U.S.
- Died: July 22, 1896 (aged 92) Dubuque, Iowa, U.S.
- Party: Jacksonian (Before 1837); Democratic (1837–1896)
- Education: Transylvania University (BA)

George Wallace Jones (April 12, 1804 – July 22, 1896) was an American frontiersman, entrepreneur, attorney, and judge, was among the first two United States senators to represent the state of Iowa after it was admitted to the Union in 1846. A Democrat who was elected before the birth of the Republican Party, Jones served over ten years in the Senate, from December 7, 1848, to March 3, 1859. During the American Civil War, he was arrested by Federal authorities and briefly jailed on suspicion of having pro-Confederate sympathies.

== Early life ==
Jones was born in Vincennes, Indiana. He was the son of John Rice Jones, who became active in efforts directed toward the introduction of slavery to the country north of the Ohio River. When George was six years old, his father moved the family to Missouri Territory, recently acquired from France as part of the Louisiana Purchase. As a child he served as a drummer for a volunteer company in the War of 1812. He later moved to Kentucky where he attended Transylvania University in 1825, and returned to Missouri to study law with his brother. After he was admitted to the bar and had practiced law for a short time, he went to work at Sinsinawa Mound, then in Michigan Territory, where he mined lead and worked and a storekeeper. He returned to Missouri, where he courted and married seventeen-year-old Josephine Gregiore in 1829. In 1831 Jones returned to Sinsinawa with his wife, seven slaves and several French laborers, to resume lead mining.

In 1832, Jones fought the Sauk and Meskwaki in the Black Hawk War, in which his brother-in-law Felix St. Vrain was killed. Jones was a judge in the local county court.

== Delegate to Congress from territories ==
Jones was a delegate to the U.S. House of Representatives from both Michigan Territory and Wisconsin Territory. Uncertainty over precisely when his terms began and ended led to a contested election that was settled by the House, in favor of his opponent, in 1839.

=== Election and service as delegate ===
Jones was elected to represent Michigan Territory as its at-large delegate in the 24th Congress. Part of the territory was in the process of becoming the state of Michigan, and already had a de facto state government in place, so Jones helped push forward legislation to create a new Territory of Wisconsin comprising what remained of Michigan Territory. That legislation became law on April 20, 1836, and Wisconsin Territory came into existence on July 4 of that year.

An election was held in October 1836 to choose the new territory's Congressional delegate, and Jones won. He took his seat at the opening of the next session of Congress on December 5, 1836, as the delegate from the Territory of Wisconsin. In that position he successfully persuaded voting members to support the designation of areas of Wisconsin Territory west of the Mississippi River as Iowa Territory. In February 1838, he served as second to Jonathan Cilley, a Congressman from Maine, in his duel with William J. Graves, a Congressman from Kentucky, in which Cilley was fatally wounded. The outpouring of anger over four Congressmen being involved in a fatal duel led to a House committee recommending censure for Jones and expulsion for Graves, but no such action was taken before the end of the session.

=== Contested election ===
In September 1838, Jones lost an election to James Duane Doty to serve as the Wisconsin Territory's delegate to Congress. Jones went to Washington to take his seat for the session beginning that December, reasoning that his term through January 26, 1837, had been as the delegate from Michigan Territory, and thus he was entitled to a full two-year term beginning March 4, 1837, as the delegate from Wisconsin Territory. He believed Doty should not be seated until his own term expired on March 4, 1839. At the opening of the session, Isaac Crary of Michigan moved that Doty, also in attendance, be seated, and the matter was referred to the Committee on Elections. The committee determined that Michigan Territory had ceased to exist on June 15, 1836, and thus Jones had ceased to be its delegate at the same time, notwithstanding that Crary had not been seated as the new state of Michigan's representative until January 27, 1837, the day after statehood was officially granted. The committee reported in favor of Doty on December 21, and on January 3, 1839, the full House voted to seat Doty. Joshua Giddings of Ohio attempted to deny Jones payment for his travel to Washington and the month of salary he had claimed, but the full House voted to honor his claim in spite of its determination that he was not entitled to the seat.

=== Other territorial offices ===
President Martin Van Buren appointed him as Surveyor-General of the Wisconsin and Iowa Territories, where he served (most likely in Dubuque, in Iowa Territory) from early 1840 until the end of the Van Buren administration in 1841. In 1845, following the election of another Democrat, James K. Polk, as president, he was reappointed Surveyor-General of Iowa Territory, one year before the southeastern eastern area of Iowa Territory became the State of Iowa.

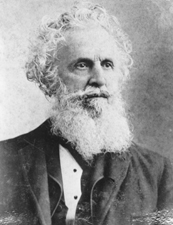
George W. Jones in his elder years

== U.S. Senate ==
Jones represented Iowa in the United States Senate from December 7, 1848, to March 3, 1859. For its first two years, the Iowa General Assembly failed to choose Iowa's first U.S. Senators, due to a three-way split that prevented any candidate from earning the required number of 30 legislators' votes. However, after the 1848 elections gave the Democratic Party a greater share of Iowa legislators, Jones became a candidate for one of the two seats, and after four ballots won the Democratic caucuses' nomination for one of the two seats. He won the election and then, by drawing lots, received the seat with the longer term (to expire in four years). He won re-election (to a full six-year term) in 1852, after winning renomination by the Democratic Party by a single vote.

Jones was Chairman of the Committee on Engrossed Bills, the Committee on Pensions, and the Committee on Enrolled Bills. He served two terms before failing to be renominated. Jones had become increasingly unpopular in Iowa, even among those in his own party, because he often voted with southern Senators on slavery-related issues. As a senator, Jones was described by his biographer as a "Democrat in politics and a southerner by instinct." He claimed to oppose slavery (despite his own slaveholding past) but insisted that Congress had no right to forbid it or criticize it where states chose to allow it. Thus, he supported the Kansas–Nebraska Act. That stance, while unremarkable at the time, ultimately rendered him incapable of re-election in a state whose antislavery, anticompromise faction became dominant midway in Jones' second term, as the new Republican Party. After his term ended, no Iowa Democrat would win election to the U.S. Senate until the 1920s. His ten years in the Senate were not matched by any Iowa Democrat until 1950, after Guy M. Gillette was elected a third time.

== Later life ==
In 1858, the Democratic Party in Iowa, like those in other northern states, was bitterly divided over the support that its own president, James Buchanan, gave for the adoption by Kansas Territory and Congress of the pro-slavery Lecompton Constitution. Jones had voted to approve the Lecompton Constitution in the Senate. When anti-slavery Iowa Democrats passed a resolution at their 1858 state convention repudiating the party's previous support for the Lecompton Constitution, Jones and others in the party's "old guard" walked out.

In 1859, President Buchanan appointed Jones as Minister Resident of the United States to New Granada (encompassing modern Colombia and Panama), requiring his relocation to Bogotá.

His service in Bogotá ended just as the Civil War broke out, as the Abraham Lincoln administration succeeded the Buchanan administration. Jones' two sons joined the Confederate Army. Upon returning to the United States in 1861, Jones was arrested by order of Secretary of State William H. Seward on the charge of disloyalty, based upon correspondence with his friend, Confederate President Jefferson Davis. He was never indicted or placed on trial. Jones was held for 34 days, until he was released by order of President Lincoln.

Jones then began a long retirement in Dubuque. In 1892, he was granted a pension by special act of Congress for his services in the Black Hawk War. On his ninetieth birthday in 1894, Governor Frank D. Jackson and the Iowa General Assembly gave Jones a public reception in recognition of his valuable services in the formative periods of the Territory and State. He died at his daughter's home in Dubuque on July 22, 1896.

Jones County, Iowa and Jones County, South Dakota were named in his honor. In 1912, the State Historical Society of Iowa published the biography George Wallace Jones, by John Carl Parish.

== Notes ==
U.S. House of Representatives
Preceded by Lucius Lyon	Delegate to the U.S. House of Representatives from the Michigan Territory's at-large congressional district 1835–1836	Constituency abolished
New constituency	Delegate to the U.S. House of Representatives from the Wisconsin Territory's at-large congressional district 1836–1839	Succeeded by James D. Doty
U.S. Senate
New seat	U.S. Senator (Class 2) from Iowa; 1848–1859; Served alongside: Augustus C. Dodge, James Harlan	Succeeded by James W. Grimes
Diplomatic posts
Preceded by James B. Bowlin	United States Minister to New Granada; 1859–1861	Succeeded by Allan Burton as U.S. Minister to Colombia
