= Gabriel Richard =

American priest and politician (1767–1832)

The Reverend Gabriel Richard de Saintes P.S.S.
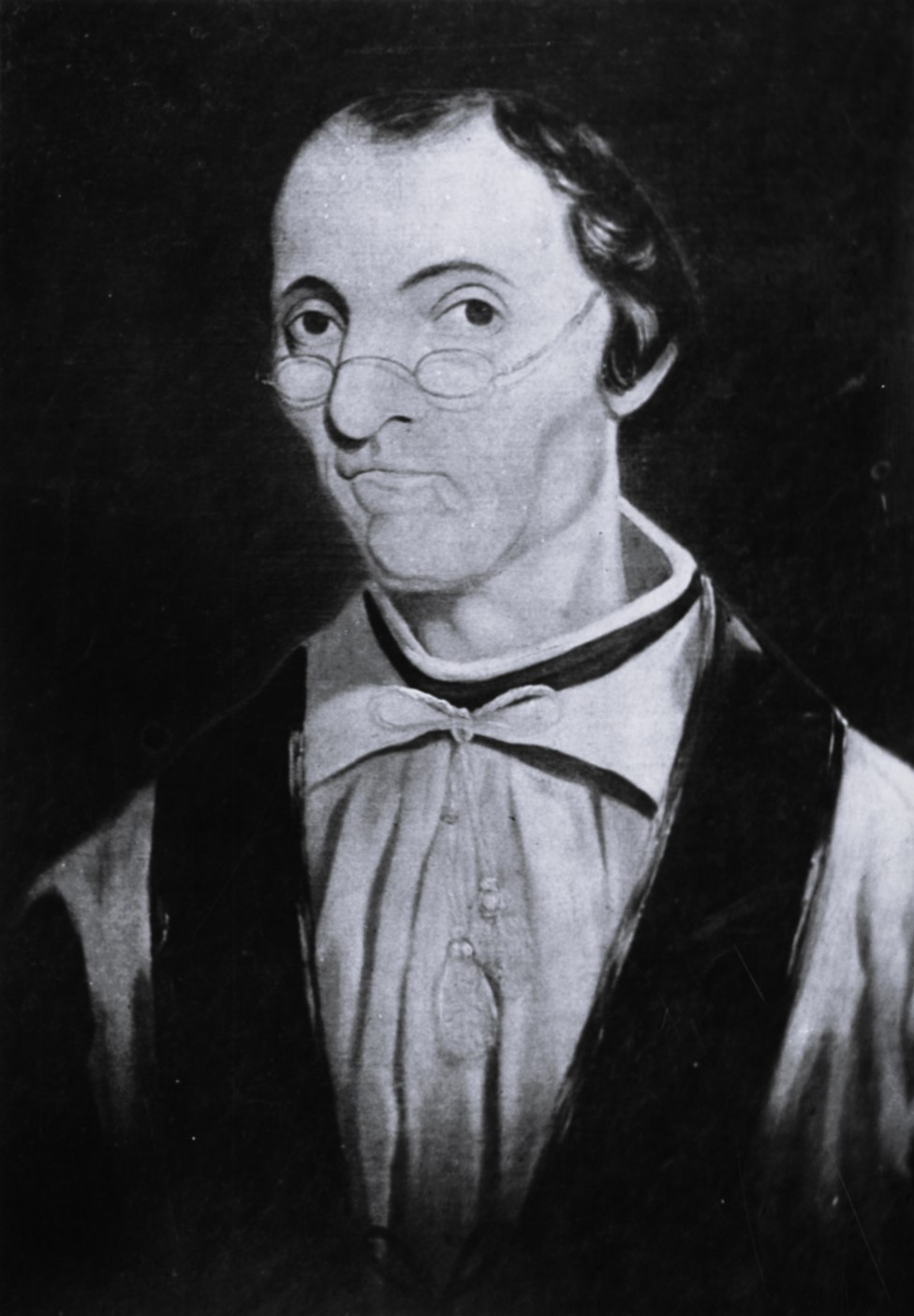

Delegate to the U.S. House of Representatives from Michigan Territory's at-large district
- In office March 4, 1823 – March 4, 1825
- Preceded by: Solomon Sibley
- Succeeded by: Austin Eli Wing

Personal details
- Born: Gabriel Jacques Richard; October 15, 1767 La Ville de Saintes, Kingdom of France
- Died: September 13, 1832 (aged 64) Detroit, Michigan
- Education: Seminary of Angers
- Occupation: Priest, missionary, educator, civic leader
- Known for: Founding the Catholepistemiad (or the University of Michigania), Coined Detroit’s Motto

Gabriel Richard P.S.S. (/rɪˈʃɑːrd/ rish-ARD; October 15, 1767 – September 13, 1832) was a French Catholic priest and a professed member of the Society of the Priests of Saint Sulpice. He ministered to the French Catholics in the parish of Sainte-Anne-de-Détroit, as well as Protestants and Native Americans living in Southeast Michigan. The calls for him to be named as a saint began in 2020.

Richard was born in La Ville de Saintes, France, in 1767 and studied at the Seminary of Angers. He was ordained as a Sulpician priest in 1790. During the French Revolution, he refused to swear the oath to the secular French Republic and fled to the United States, transitorily settling in Baltimore. Later, Bishop John Carroll assigned him to do missionary work in the Northwest Territory.

Richard arrived in Detroit in 1798 as an assistant pastor at Sainte Anne's Church, where he quickly became known for converting the hearts of the Native Americans when he went about preaching. He was a strong proponent of perpetual adoration of the Eucharist. In 1802, he became the rector of Sainte Anne's Church. During his tenure, he not only oversaw the seminary and French Christian schools in the region but also commenced new schools for both boys and girls and built a library for the church.

Following the Great Fire of 1805, Richard helped create a new layout for Detroit and, since 1806, proposed the establishment of the Catholepistemiad, known today as the University of Michigan, on several occasions. He became the founding vice president of the university in 1817 and later served on its board of trustees. In 1823, he became the first Roman Catholic priest to be elected to the U.S. House of Representatives as a delegate from the Michigan Territory for the 18th Congress. He died in 1832 during the second cholera pandemic while caring for patients.

Though Richard lived in the late 18th century through the early 19th century, well after the actual founding of Detroit, he was often celebrated as one of the four honorary founders of the city, alongside Antoine Cadillac, Jacques Marquette and the Sieur de La Salle. The motto Richard wrote in the aftermath of the fire of 1805, Speramus meliora; resurget cineribus ("We hope for better things; it will arise from the ashes") is inscribed on the seal of the city.

== Early life ==
Born in La Ville de Saintes on October 15, 1767, Gabriel Richard was the third of six children born to François Richard and Marie Geneviève Bossuet. At age 11, Richard entered the collège in Saintes to receive an elementary education.

=== Seminary of Angers and the Sulpicians ===
Richard enrolled in the Seminary of Angers in 1784.

The seminary stood near the cathedral in Angers and comprised two buildings: one, the major seminary for students in theology, and the other, the minor seminary for students in philosophy. Its foundation is credited to M. Ignace de la Dauversière de Champy, who is related to Jérôme le Royer de la Dauversière, the principal founder of the Société Notre-Dame de Montréal and the visionary behind the settlement of Ville-Marie (Montreal). In 1650, Champy was sent by the Jesuits of La Fleche to join the society of priests at Saint-Sulpice to be trained under Jean-Jacques Olier. After his training, Champy was sent to Angers to lead the seminary.

Richard entered the minor seminary first, where he learned logic, metaphysics, ethics, mathematics, and physics. Richard began his theological studies in the major seminary in 1786. In June 1789, he informed his parents that he was preparing to defend a thesis in theology, which would make him eligible for the bachelor's degree.

Richard joined the Society of Saint-Sulpice in 1789 and became a priest. He was ordained on October 15, 1790.

=== French Revolution ===
During the French Revolution, which began in the spring of 1792, revolutionary militants demanded that priests declare their allegiance to the secular French Republic. Richard refused to swear the oath and on April 2, he sailed from Le Havre on the ship named Reine des Coeurs (Queen of Hearts) for the United States. More than 200 priests were killed by revolutionary forces four months later.

He emigrated to Baltimore, Maryland. He taught mathematics at St. Mary's Seminary in Baltimore, until being assigned by Bishop Carroll to do missionary work to the Indians in the Northwest Territory. He was first stationed in what is now Kaskaskia, Illinois, and later in Detroit, Michigan.

== Missionary ==
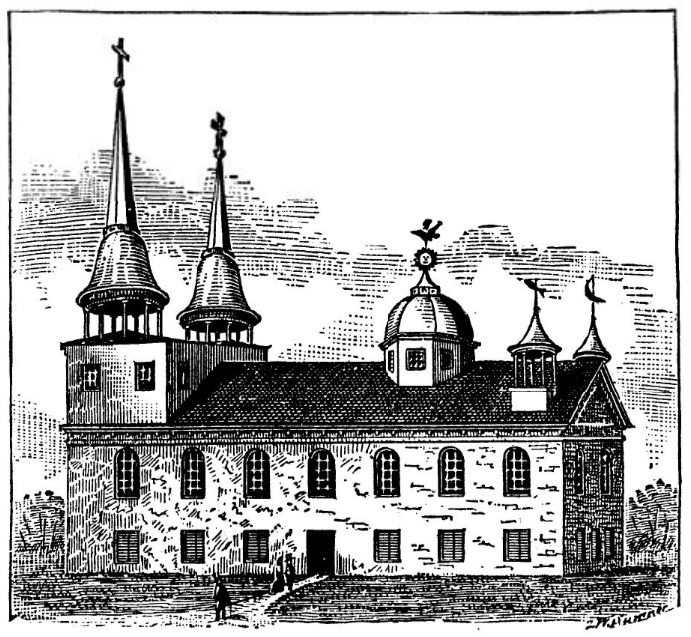
Ste. Anne's "Stone Church", built in 1818

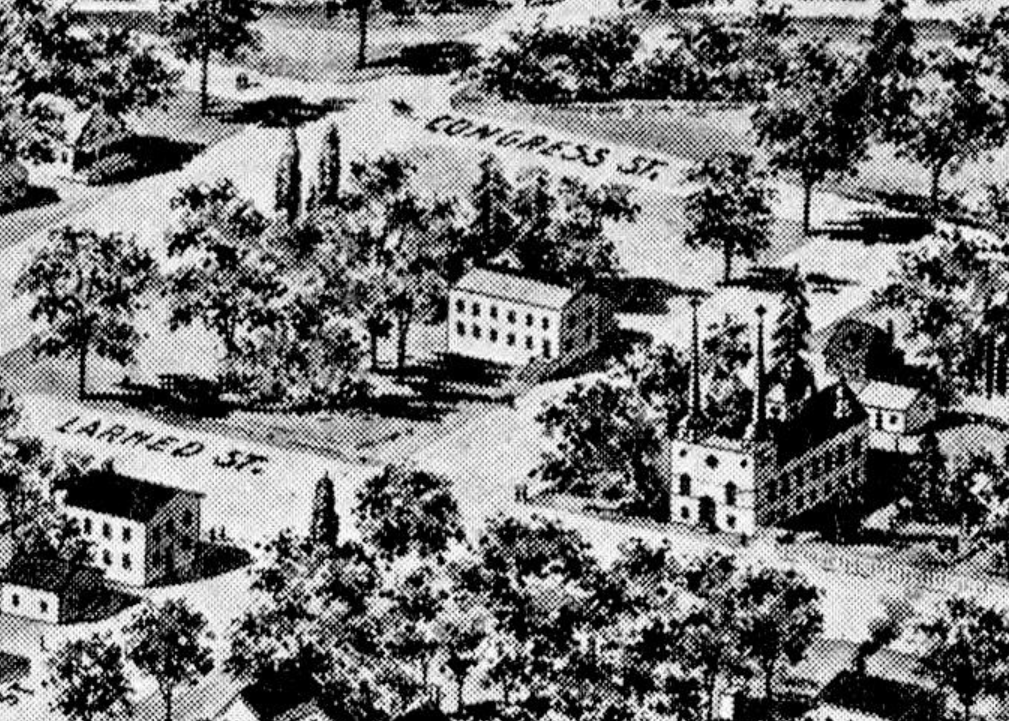
The Catholepistemiad's schoolhouse (center) on an 1818 map of Detroit. The schoolhouse fronts Bates Street, directly across from Ste. Anne's "Stone Church" (middle of the lower right).

Richard arrived in Detroit on the Feast of Corpus Christi, which was on June 7, 1798, to be the assistant pastor at Basilica of Sainte Anne de Détroit (Sainte Anne's Church). Michael Levadoux was the pastor. Many of the people in Detroit, both Catholics and Protestants, were of French ancestry. He acquired the name Le Bon Pere (the good father), regardless of their religion.

He traveled to distant communities. South of Detroit, he met with Catholics along Maumee Bay, and along the Raisin, Huron, Ecorse, and Rouge River areas. To the north, he ministered to those along the St. Clair and Black Rivers. And he visited Catholics along Anchor Bay, Swan Creek, L'Anse Creuse Bay on Lake St. Clair, and the Clinton River. He established the third oldest parish in Michigan along the Clinton River when he established a log chapel called St. Peter's of Mt. Clemens in 1799. The same year, he traveled north to visit the Odawa at L'Arbre Croche. Soon after, a smallpox epidemic spread through the Great Lakes region. More than one half of L'Arbre Croche settlement's residents died. The Odawa believed deaths were retributions, either because Richard's religion was evil or that the Great Spirit was angered by the possibility of the natives accepting Catholicism.

In 1801, Bishop Pierre Denaut arrived in Detroit from Quebec. He administered the Sacrament of Confirmation to 536 parishioners, of those all but 10 were of French heritage.

Richard became the pastor of the church in 1802. He gave sermons on Sundays for the church parishioners, and at some point began providing sermons for Protestants and Native Americans. With his assistant pastor, Father Jean Dilhet, he ran separate schools for girls and boys beginning in 1804 and established a library for the church. He trained four people to be teachers and provided education to local Native Americans. He also had looms delivered and taught members of the church to weave.

A fire leveled the city on June 11, 1805, including Sainte Anne's Church. This is when Gabriel Richard wrote the city of Detroit's motto: Speramus meliora; resurget cineribus; In English: "We hope for better things; it will arise from the ashes." The words are printed on the seal of the City of Detroit. Richard organized the shipment of food aid to the city from neighboring ribbon farms on both sides of the Detroit River to alleviate a food crisis following the loss of the city's supply of livestock and grain. He arranged for funding from Washington, D.C., and, with other leaders, created a new city plan for the streets in Detroit, including Jefferson and Michigan Avenues.

Following the fire of 1805, Richard addressed a memorial to the territorial governor and judges on October 18, 1808. In this memorial, he proposed the establishment of an "institution for higher learning", and suggested that a lottery might be used to support the academies he headed. In 1817, the Territorial government, at the instigation of Fr. Richard and Judge Augustus B. Woodward and with the support of President Thomas Jefferson, passed "an Act to establish the Catholepistemiad, or University of Michigania" within the Territory of Michigan. He was the university's founding vice-president, and later served on its board of trustee.

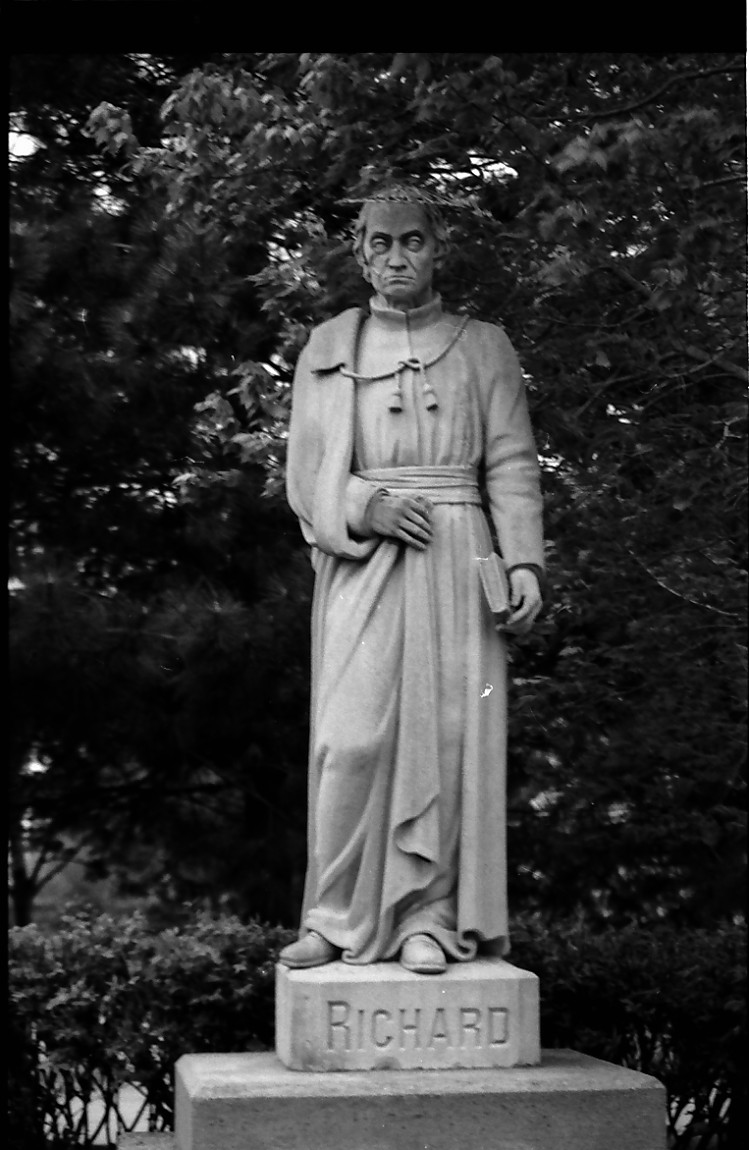
A "larger than life" sandstone statue of Fr. Gabriel Richard from the old Detroit City Hall Building

Richard commenced the first printing press in Detroit and published a periodical in the French language entitled Essais du Michigan, as well as The Michigan Essay, or Impartial Observer, in 1809. He also printed books with the press, including reprints of books. He is said to have printed The Child's Spelling Book. He had a personal library of 240 books on history, literature, theology, philosophy, law, and science. He also had a book of the Gospel of St. John that was printed in Mohawk and English.

Richard ministered among the Indians of the region and was generally admired by them. During the War of 1812, Richard was imprisoned by the British for refusing to swear an oath of allegiance after their capture of Detroit, saying, "I have taken an oath to support the Constitution of the United States and I cannot take another. Do with me as you please." He was released when the Shawnee chief Tecumseh, despite his hatred for the Americans, refused to fight for the British while Richard was imprisoned. The Americans won the war in 1815.

In the Treaty of Fort Meigs, signed in 1817, the Indigenous nations ceded their remaining lands within the Ohio territory to the United States. In exchange, the Catholic members of the Chippewa, Ottawa, and Potawatomy tribes specifically requested that six sections of land be reserved for the rector of St. Ann's Church for religious purposes and for the "college at Detroit," which is known today as the University of Michigan, where Richard was a founder, to support the education of their children.

Richard was elected as a nonvoting delegate of the Michigan Territory to the U.S. House of Representatives for the 18th Congress, and was the first Catholic priest to be elected to that body, serving a single term from March 4, 1823, to March 3, 1825. He secured the first federal appropriation for the Territorial Road across Michigan's lower peninsula; it was developed as Michigan Avenue, connecting Detroit with Chicago. He was an unsuccessful candidate for reelection in 1824 to the Nineteenth Congress.

== Death ==
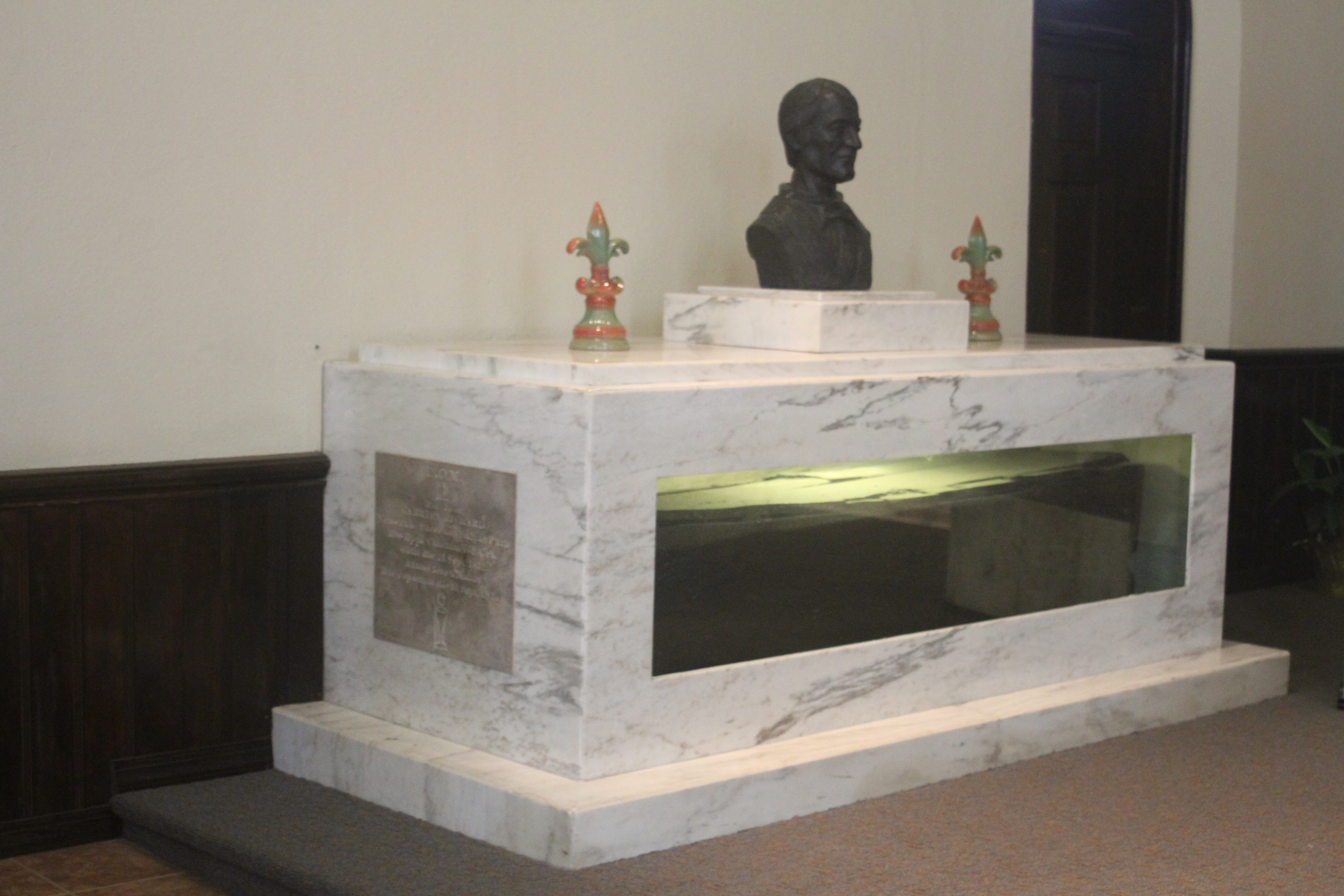
The tomb of Father Gabriel Richard resides now in the Basilica's Fr. Gabriel Richard Chapel

On September 13, 1832, after caring patients during an cholera epidemic, Gabriel Richard died in Detroit. He was buried in a crypt in the chapel of Sainte Anne's and was later moved to the Fr. Gabriel Richard Chapel where his coffin is on full display. His library was among the collection of the Sacred Heart Seminary beginning in 1925 and were presented to the University of Michigan in 1951.

In 1937, The Michigan Catholic said that Richard had a

remarkable career that has made him one of the outstanding pioneer priests of America. The history of the Catholic Church in Michigan for the next thirty years was practically identified with the life and labors of this tall, gaunt priest and citizen who literally wore himself out in the service of his community.

== Legacy ==
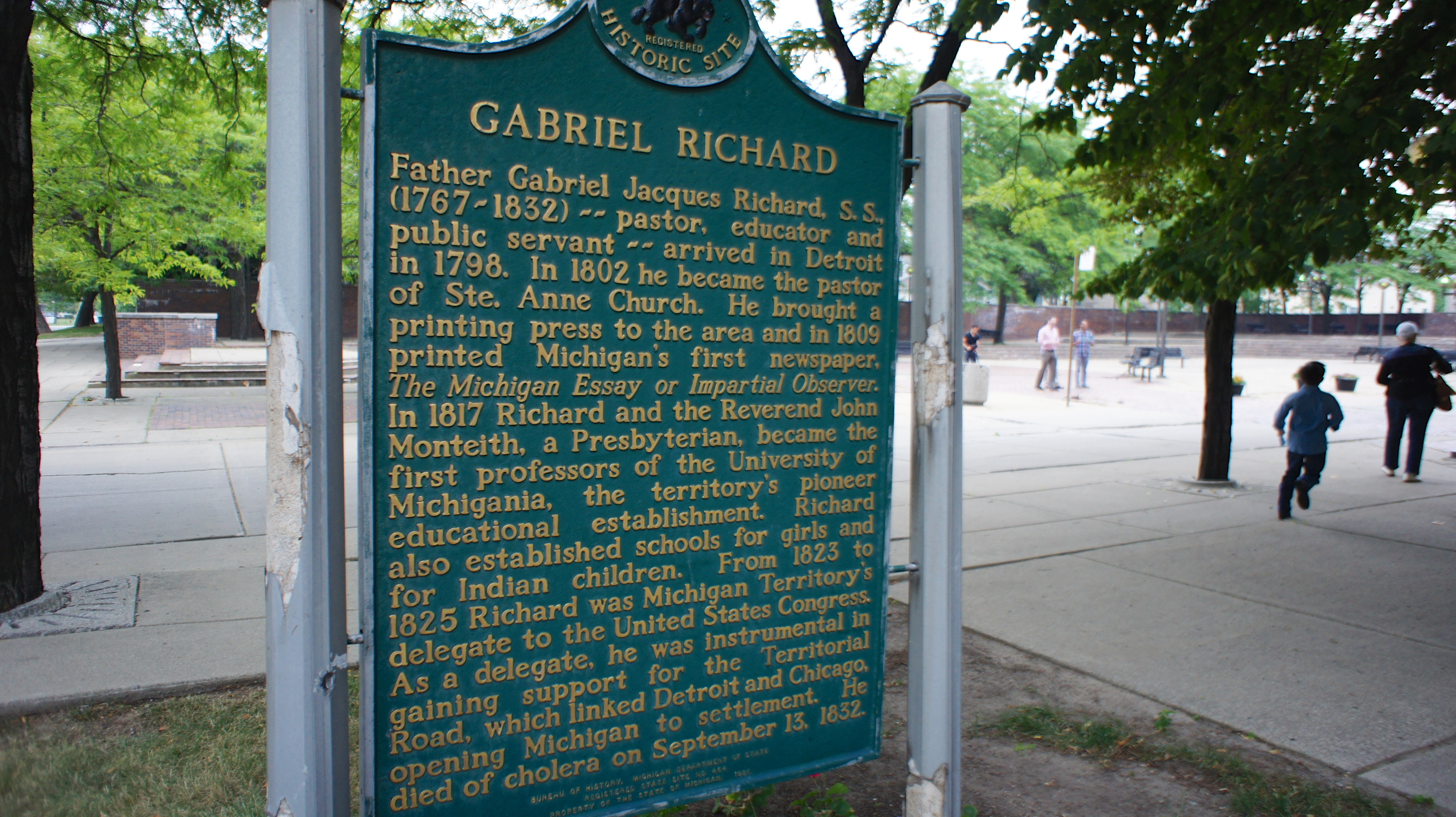
State of Michigan Historical Marker summarizing the life of Father Gabriel Richard. Located outside Basilica of Sainte Anne de Détroit

- A bronze bust of Richard by Frank Varga marks his tomb within Sainte Anne Church.
- A State of Michigan Historical Marker commemorates Richard outside Sainte Anne Church in Detroit.
- A statue of Richard resides on the Detroit City Hall's exterior. It was made by Julius Melchers.
- A statue of Richard is located at Mullen Park at Wayne State University.
- A statue of Richard is located at Gabriel Richard Park at East Jefferson and East Grand Boulevard.
- A State of Michigan Historical Marker commemorates Richard in Jonesville, Michigan for his negotiation for federal funds for the Sauk Trail, also called the Territorial Road.
- The motto that he first penned, Speramus meliora; resurget cineribus, continues to be the official motto of the City of Detroit.

There are at least four schools near Detroit named after Richard:

- Gabriel Richard Catholic High School in Riverview, Michigan
- Father Gabriel Richard High School in Ann Arbor, Michigan
- Gabriel Richard Elementary School in Detroit
- Père Gabriel Richard Elementary School in Grosse Pointe Farms, Michigan.

== Canonization ==
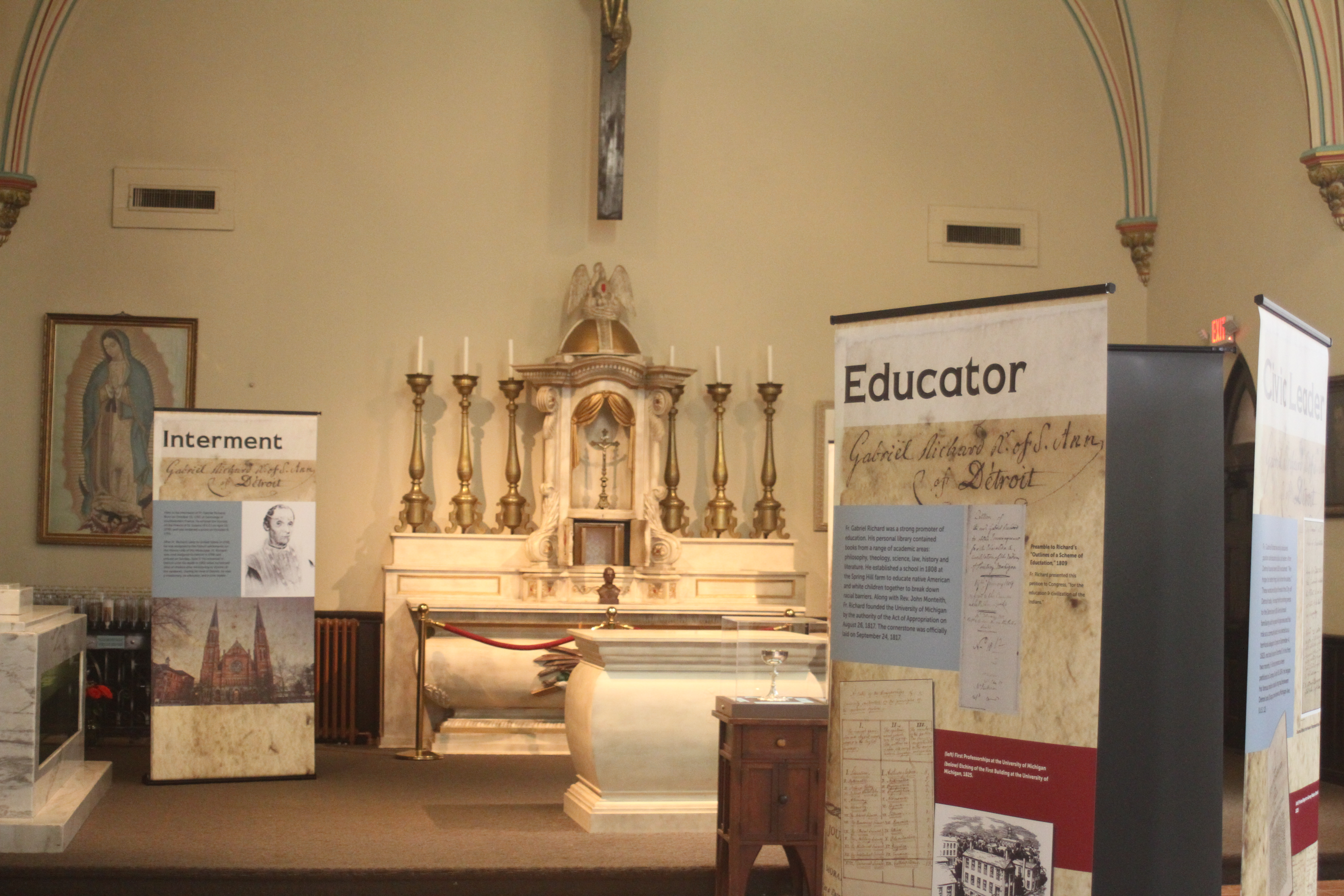
Annually the Basilica of Ste. Anne de Detroit and the Fr. Gabriel Richard Guild host an exhibit each September and October detailing the life and legacy of Richard.

The Fr. Gabriel Richard Guild was formed on September 20, 2020, as one of the first steps towards canonization of Richard. Coinciding with the announcement, Detroit's Archbishop Allen Vigneron released a statement, saying "Fr. Richard was a zealous pastor whose missionary heart guided all that he did. At a time when we in the Archdiocese are coming to a renewed awareness of our missionary vocation, I am grateful that we are able to raise up Fr. Richard as a model and inspiration for our mission today." The purpose of the guild is to determine if there is sufficient "heroic virtue or holiness worth promoting" by the church's archbishop and other bishops in Michigan.

== See also ==
- Robert Drinan, the first Roman Catholic priest to serve as a voting member of Congress

U.S. House of Representatives
Preceded by Solomon Sibley	Delegate to the U.S. House of Representatives from Michigan Territory; 1823–1825	Succeeded by Austin Eli Wing
