= Fort Shelby (Michigan) =

1779-1826 British-built fort in modern day Detroit, Michigan

Coordinates: 42°19′48.5″N 83°02′55.4″W

Fort Shelby (Fort Lernoult, Fort Detroit)
- Detroit, Michigan
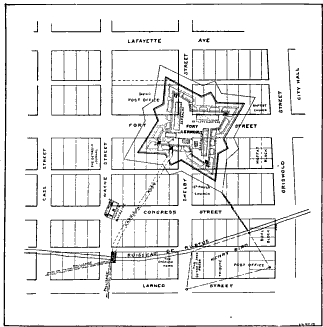
- Fort location overlaid on modern street map

Site information
- Type: Bastion fort
- Controlled by: British (1779-1796); Americans (1796-1812); British (1812-1813); Americans (1813-1826)

Site history
- Built: 1778–1779
- Built by: British
- In use: 1779–1826
- Materials: Wood, earth
- Demolished: 1827

Garrison information
- Past commanders: Richard B. Lernoult, Jean François Hamtramck, William Hull

Fort Shelby was a military fort in what is now Detroit, Michigan that played a significant role in the War of 1812 (1812-1815). It was built by the British Army in 1779 as Fort Lernoult, and was ceded to the United States by the terms of the Jay Treaty in 1796, following up on the original terms of the peace agreement of the Treaty of Paris that ended the American Revolutionary War (1775-1783), 13 years earlier when the British held on to continuing occupying several fortifications on the new American-Canadian international border. It was renamed Fort Detroit by the U.S. Secretary of War Henry Dearborn in 1805.

The then American commander William Hull of the United States Army, surrendered the fort in 1812, shortly after War was declared in June 1812 by the United States Congress and approved by the President, James Madison. But it was reclaimed by the U.S. military forces the following year in 1813. The Americans renamed it Fort Shelby then in 1813, but occasional references to "Fort Detroit" relating to the War of 1812 period of 1812-1815, are to this fort.

The earlier Fort Detroit, built by the Royal French for their New France colony from Quebec City in the interior of North America, around the Great Lakes, as part of their then world-wide First French Empire and occupied by them during the Seven Years' War / French and Indian War of 1753-1763 in America, After the loss of French territories and their New France and Louisiana and Canada possessions in North America in the Treaty of Paris of 1763, the British Army reoccupied all the fortifications and reigned supreme on the continent for the next two decades. But Detroit was later abandoned by the British 16 years later in 1779, during the American Revolutionary War (1775-1783), in favor of Fort Lernoult. Fort Shelby was later returned to and occupied finally by the United States after Jay's Treaty of 1796, negotiations and ratification further settled outstanding issues with the former Mother Country, including continued British occupation of border fortifications on American soil, a decade after the Revolutionary War ended, despite the terms of the subsequent peace of the second Treaty of Paris of 1783, recognizing the Independence of the United States. The site was given later to the surrounding city of Detroit in 1826 and was dismantled the following year in 1827.

== History ==
=== Fort Lernoult under the British ===
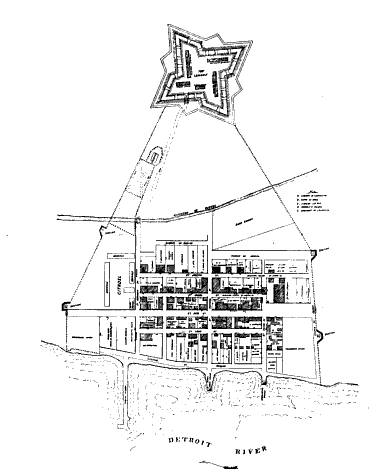
A topographical plan of the town of Detroit prior to the Great Fire of 1805, depicting Fort Shelby (above) and the French era buildings of Fort Pontchartrain du Détroit (below).

In the fall of 1778, Captain Richard Lernoult, the commander of the British Army at Fort Detroit, feared that the existing encampment would not be sufficient to defend against the oncoming American forces. Under the command of Colonel Daniel Brodhead, they had advanced to within ninety miles. He dispatched his second in command, Captain Henry Bird, to plan a new fortification on higher ground. Work commenced on the project in November 1778, and although construction was beset by problems due to severe weather, by October 1779 a total of 381 British troops were stationed at the new fort.

The fort was constructed of a 4' high pile of tree trunks, topped with 7–8' long sharpened stakes, all of which were covered with an 11' high earth embankment, 12' wide at the top and 26' thick at the base. Outside of the embankment was a 5–6' deep ditch, 12' wide and containing an 11–12' picket.

Although the British had promised to abandon their forts in U.S. territory following the end of the Revolutionary War in 1783, they continued to occupy six of them, including Fort Lernoult (others were Fort Oswegatchie, Fort Niagara, Fort Ontario, Fort Miami (Ohio) and Fort Mackinac). President George Washington sent Chief Justice John Jay to London in 1794 to negotiate a resolution to this and other issues. The Jay Treaty called for the forts to be turned over to the U.S. by June 1796. The British abandoned Fort Lernoult and moved their forces to Fort Amherstburg on the Canadian side of the Detroit River. The Americans occupied the fort on July 11, 1796, under the command of Colonel Jean François Hamtramck with 300 men.

=== American control and the War of 1812 ===
Tecumseh and Isaac Brock viewing Fort Detroit

On August 5, 1805, Secretary of War Henry Dearborn sent a letter to Fort Lernoult's commander, Samuel Dyson, informing him that the fort's name had been changed to Fort Detroit. Michigan Territory Governor William Hull expanded the fort in 1807, building a higher (14 feet) stockade. Upon the outbreak of hostilities with the British in 1812, Hull was named a brigadier general and placed in command of the Army of the Northwest. Hull left Fort Lernoult on July 12, 1812, to undertake an invasion of Canada, which was abandoned after he learned that the British had captured the island Fort Mackinac.

Following Hull's retreat to the other side of the Detroit River, British General Isaac Brock set up artillery batteries in what is now Windsor, Ontario, directly opposite the fort. According to Brock's later report, the attacking force included 600 warriors and 1300 soldiers, as well as two warships. On the morning of August 15, 1812, Brock sent a demand to Hull, with an implicit threat of massacre at the hands of his Indian allies:

Sir, The force at my disposal authorizes me to require of you the immediate surrender of Fort Detroit. It is far from my inclination to join in a war of extermination, but you must be aware that the numerous body of Indians, who have attached themselves to my troops, will be beyond my control the moment the contest commences.

Hull initially refused to surrender, replying:

Sir, I have received your letter of this date. I have no other reply to make, than to inform you that I am prepared to meet any force which may be at your disposal, and any consequences, which may result from any exertion of it you may think proper to make.

The following morning, under cover from their batteries as well as the ships HMS Queen Charlotte and HMS Hunter, the British crossed the Detroit River and began advancing on the fort. As casualties began to rise, and fearing slaughter at the hands of the Indians, Hull surrendered the fort and all of its weapons, as well as two detachments of troops under the command of Colonels Lewis Cass and Duncan McArthur that were returning to the fort. General Hull was court-martialed for surrendering the fort without a fight, and sentenced to be shot, but he was pardoned by President James Madison.

The fort remained in British hands for over a year, until the Battle of Lake Erie. Following their defeat in the naval battle, and with General William Henry Harrison advancing on Detroit with 1,000 troops, the British retreated to the Canadian side of the river. Duncan McArthur, by then a general, took possession of the fort on September 29, 1813, and the fort was renamed Fort Shelby in honor of Governor Isaac Shelby of Kentucky, who had come to the aid of General Harrison with a regiment of volunteers.

The fort was occupied for the next 13 years, but fell into disrepair. Congress gave it to the city of Detroit in 1826, and it was demolished in the spring of 1827.

=== The site today ===
The fort was centered on the present-day intersection of Fort Street and Shelby Street in downtown Detroit, and bounded by Michigan Avenue, Griswold Street, W. Congress Street, and Cass Avenue. While excavating in 1961 to build the Detroit Bank & Trust Building, the remains of a wooden post from the fort were discovered. A total of over 8,000 artifacts were retrieved and are now housed at the Anthropology Museum at Wayne State University.

Today, the site is occupied by the Theodore Levin United States Courthouse, the western portion of the Penobscot Building, the former Federal Reserve Bank of Chicago Detroit Branch Building, and other commercial buildings. The Fort Shelby Hotel, which is listed on the National Register of Historic Places, is named after Fort Shelby and its physical location is near the footprint of the original fort.

== See also ==
- Fort Wayne (Detroit)
