= John Carl Parish =

American historian (1881–1939)

- Born: July 25, 1881; Des Moines, Iowa, U.S.
- Died: January 13, 1939 (aged 57)
- Education: Iowa State Normal School; University of Iowa (PhD)
- Occupation: Historian

John Carl Parish (July 25, 1881 – January 13, 1939) was an American historian of American history.

Parish was born in Des Moines, Iowa. He earned a degree from the Iowa State Normal School in 1902, and then from the University of Iowa in 1905. In 1908 he earned a Ph.D., also from the University of Iowa.

He had published a biography of Robert Lucas by the time he earned his Ph.D., and soon thereafter published biographies of John Chambers and George Wallace Jones. In 1914 he became assistant professor of history, then professor, at Colorado College, where he stayed until 1917. He served with the Intelligence Section of the American Expeditionary Force during World War I, then returned to lecture in history at the University of Iowa from 1920 to 1922. In 1922 he moved to the University of California, Los Angeles (UCLA) as assistant professor, and became associate professor there in 1924 and full professor in 1927. He stayed at UCLA until a severe illness in 1936 forced him to take time off from teaching. He made a partial recovery and returned to teaching in early 1937, but died two years later.

Parish edited a number of collections and journals during his career, and founded the Pacific Historical Review.
