= List of cemeteries in Michigan =

This list of cemeteries in Michigan includes currently operating, historical (closed for new interments), and defunct (graves abandoned or removed) cemeteries, columbaria, and mausolea which are historical and/or notable. It does not include pet cemeteries.

== Bay County ==
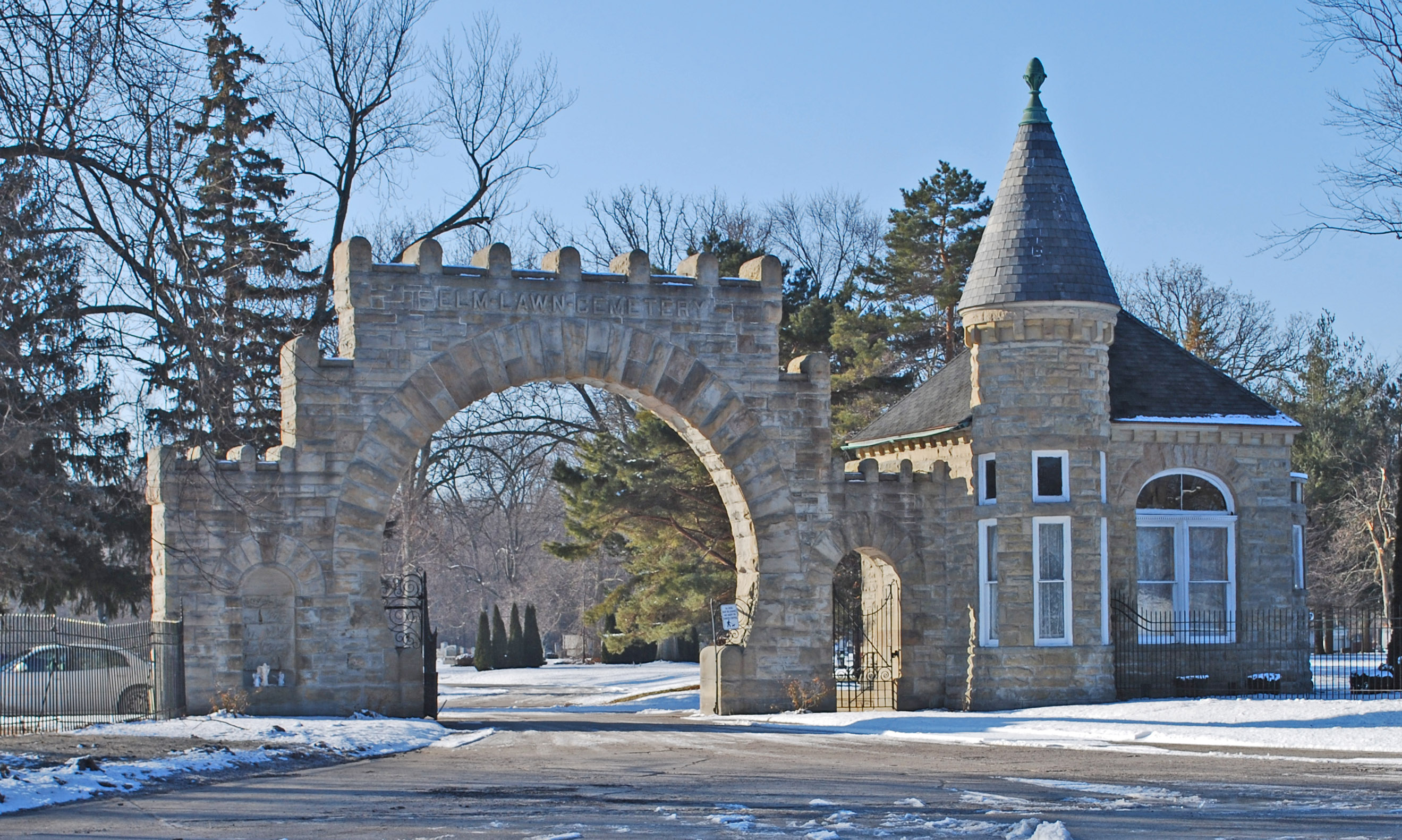
Gate for Elm Lawn Cemetery in Bay City, Bay County

- Fletcher Site in Bay City; a Native American cemetery and archaeological site

== Berrien County ==
- South Berrien Center Union Church and Cemetery in Berrien Township; NRHP-listed

== Charlevoix County ==
- Garden Island Indian Cemetery on Garden Island; NRHP-listed, MSHS-listed

== Emmet County ==
- Saint Ignatius Church and Cemetery in Good Hart; NRHP-listed

== Genesee County ==
- Glenwood Cemetery in Flint; NRHP-listed, MSHS-listed

== Houghton County ==
- Saint Henry's Evangelical Lutheran Church and Cemetery in Laird Township; NRHP-listed

== Ingham County ==
- Mount Hope Cemetery in Lansing
- St. Katherine's Chapel in Williamston Township; NRHP-listed, MSHS-listed
- Maple Grove Cemetery, Mason; NRHP-listed

== Kalamazoo County ==
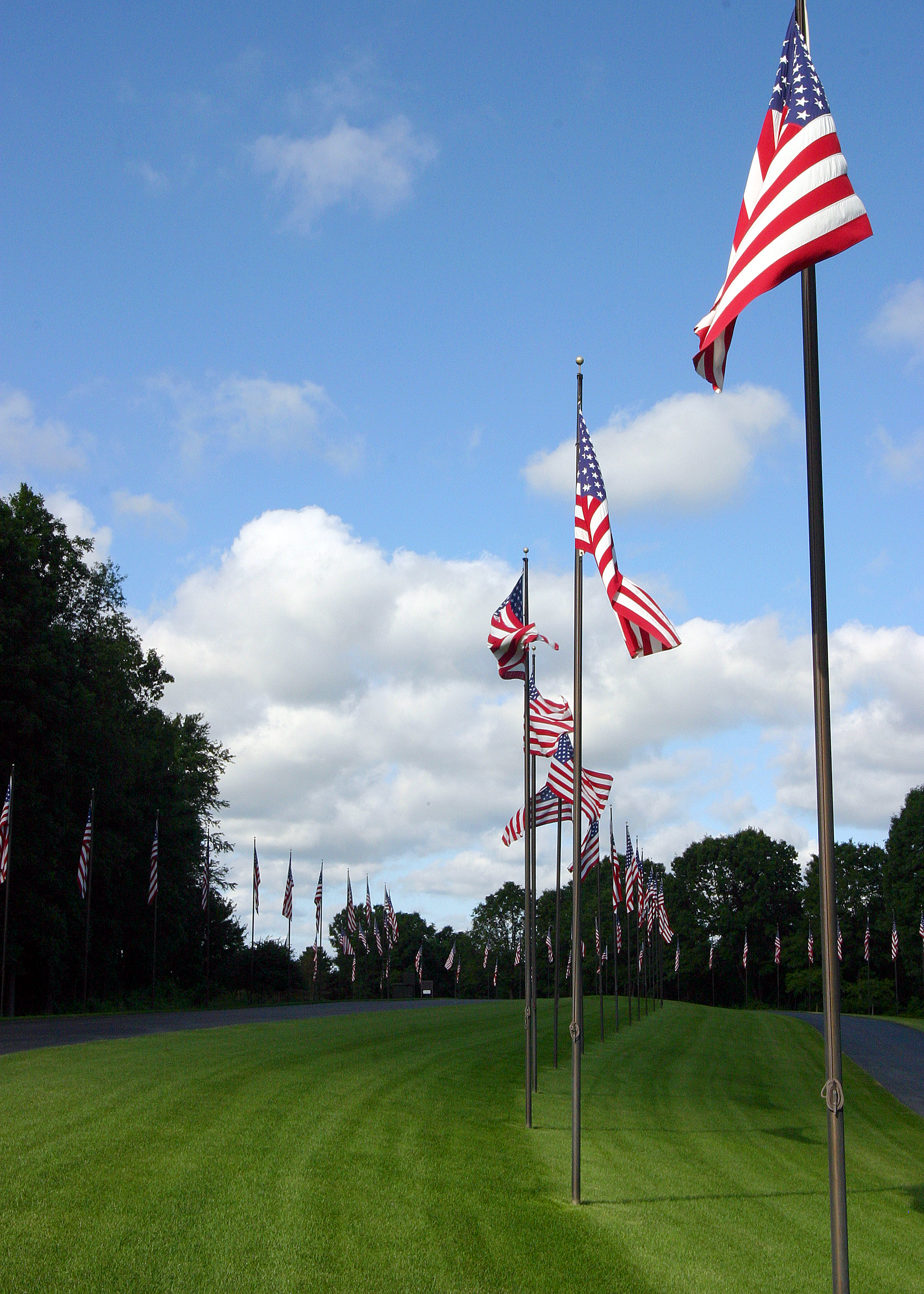
Avenue of Flags at Fort Custer National Cemetery near Augusta, Kalamazoo County

- Fort Custer National Cemetery near Augusta

== Kalkaska County ==
- Westwood Cemetery in Rapid River Township

== Kent County ==
- Ahavas Israel Cemetery in Grand Rapids

== Keweenaw County ==
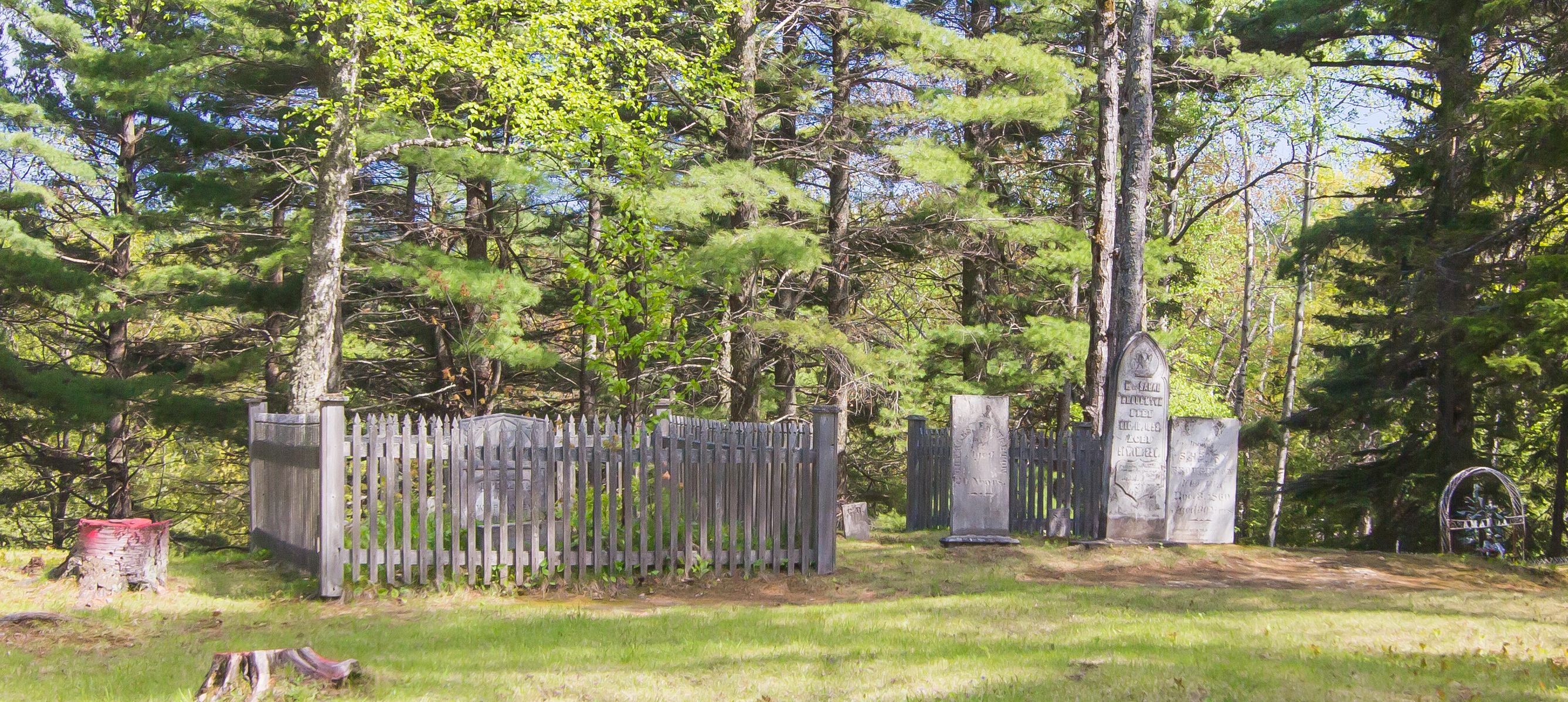
Copper Harbor Cemetery in Copper Harbor, Keweenaw County

- Copper Harbor Cemetery in Copper Harbor
- Eagle River Cemetery in Eagle River

== Lenawee County ==
- Brookside Cemetery in Tecumseh; NRHP-listed, MSHS-listed
- Saint Joseph Church and Shrine in Cambridge Township; NRHP-listed, MSHS-listed
- Saint Michael and All Angels Episcopal Church in Cambridge Township; NRHP-listed, MSHS-listed

== Livingston County ==
- St. Augustine Catholic Church and Cemetery in Hartland; NRHP-listed, MSHS-listed

== Macomb County ==
- Clinton Grove Cemetery in Clinton Charter Township; NRHP-listed, MSHS-listed

== Mackinac County ==
- Gros Cap Cemetery, Gros Cap; NRHP-listed, MSHS-listed

== Mecosta County ==
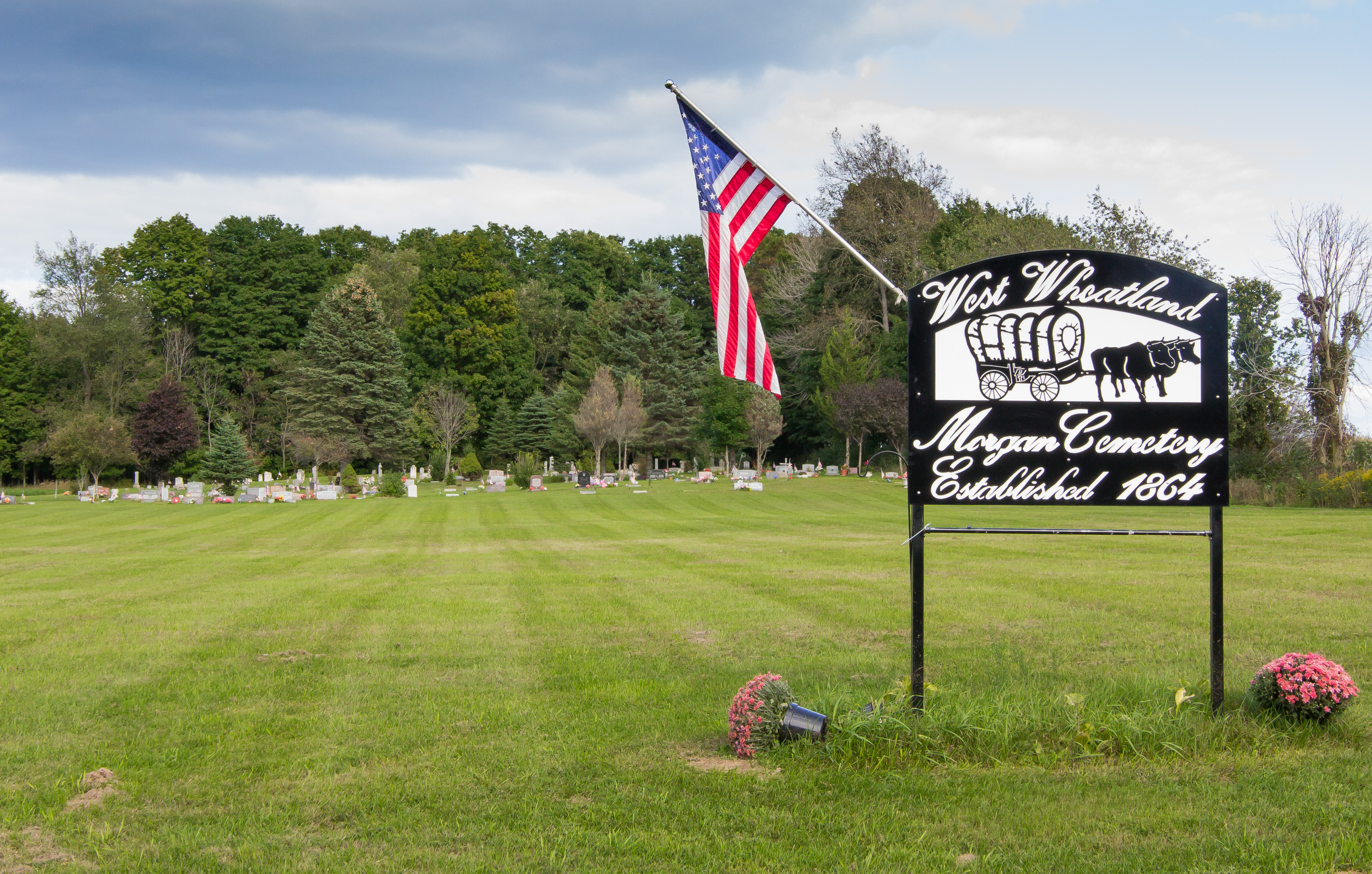
Morgan West Wheatland Cemetery in Wheatland Township, Mecosta County

- Morgan West Wheatland Cemetery in Wheatland Township; NRHP-listed

== Monroe County ==
- Potter Cemetery in Ash Township
- Woodland Cemetery in Monroe

== Muskegon County ==
- Mouth Cemetery near Montague

== Oakland County ==
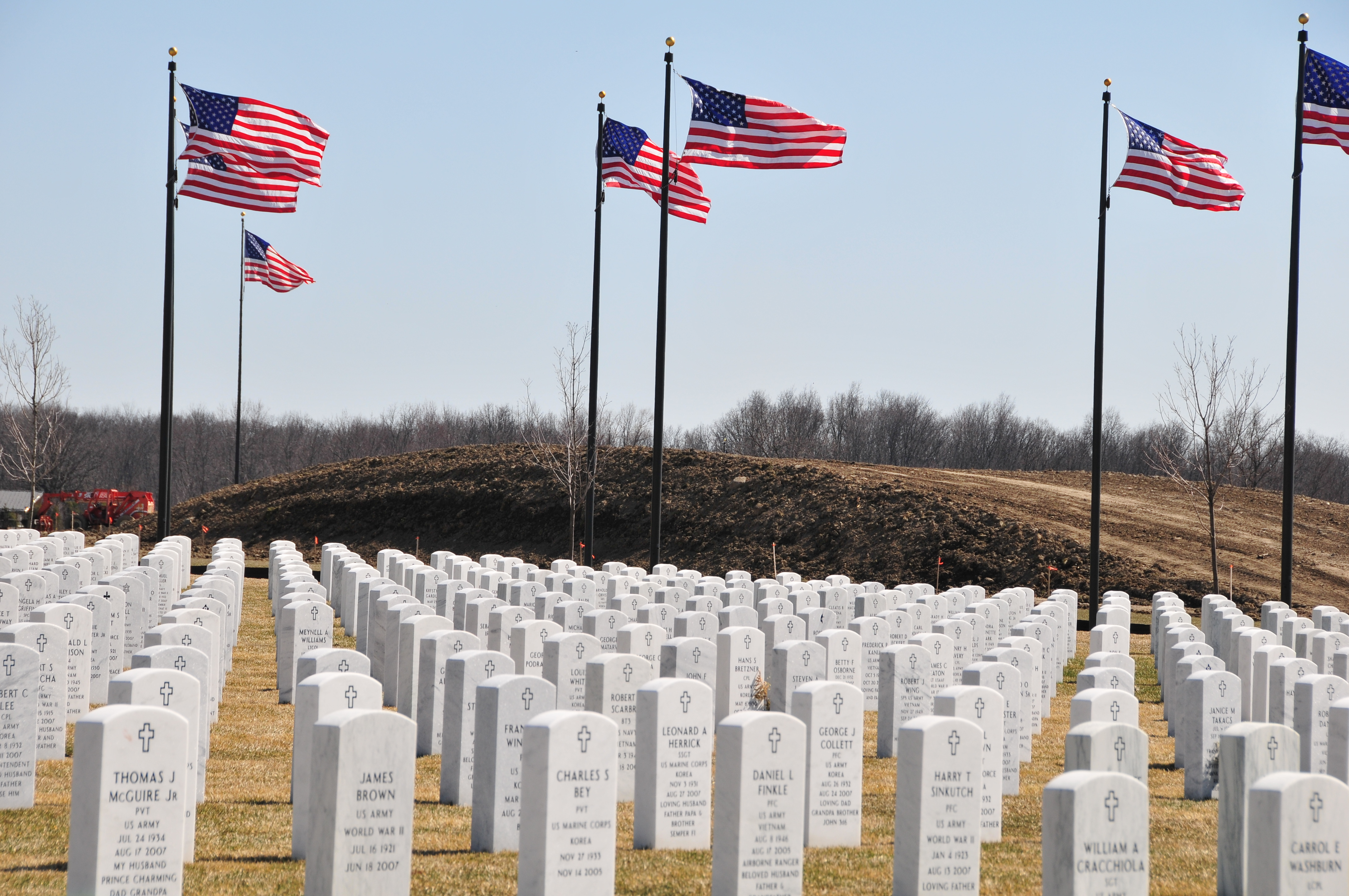
Great Lakes National Cemetery (2009) in Holly, Oakland County

- Great Lakes National Cemetery in Holly
- Greenwood Cemetery in Birmingham
- Holy Sepulchre Cemetery in Southfield
- White Chapel Memorial Cemetery in Troy

== Roscommon County ==
- Cemetery at Eggleston School in Nester Township; NRHP-listed, MSHS-listed

== Saginaw County ==
- Oakwood Cemetery in Saginaw
- Oakwood Memorial Mausoleum in Saginaw

== St. Clair County ==
- Lakeside Cemetery in Port Huron

== Washtenaw County ==
- Forest Hill Cemetery in Ann Arbor
- Highland Cemetery in Ypsilanti; NRHP-listed

== Wayne County ==
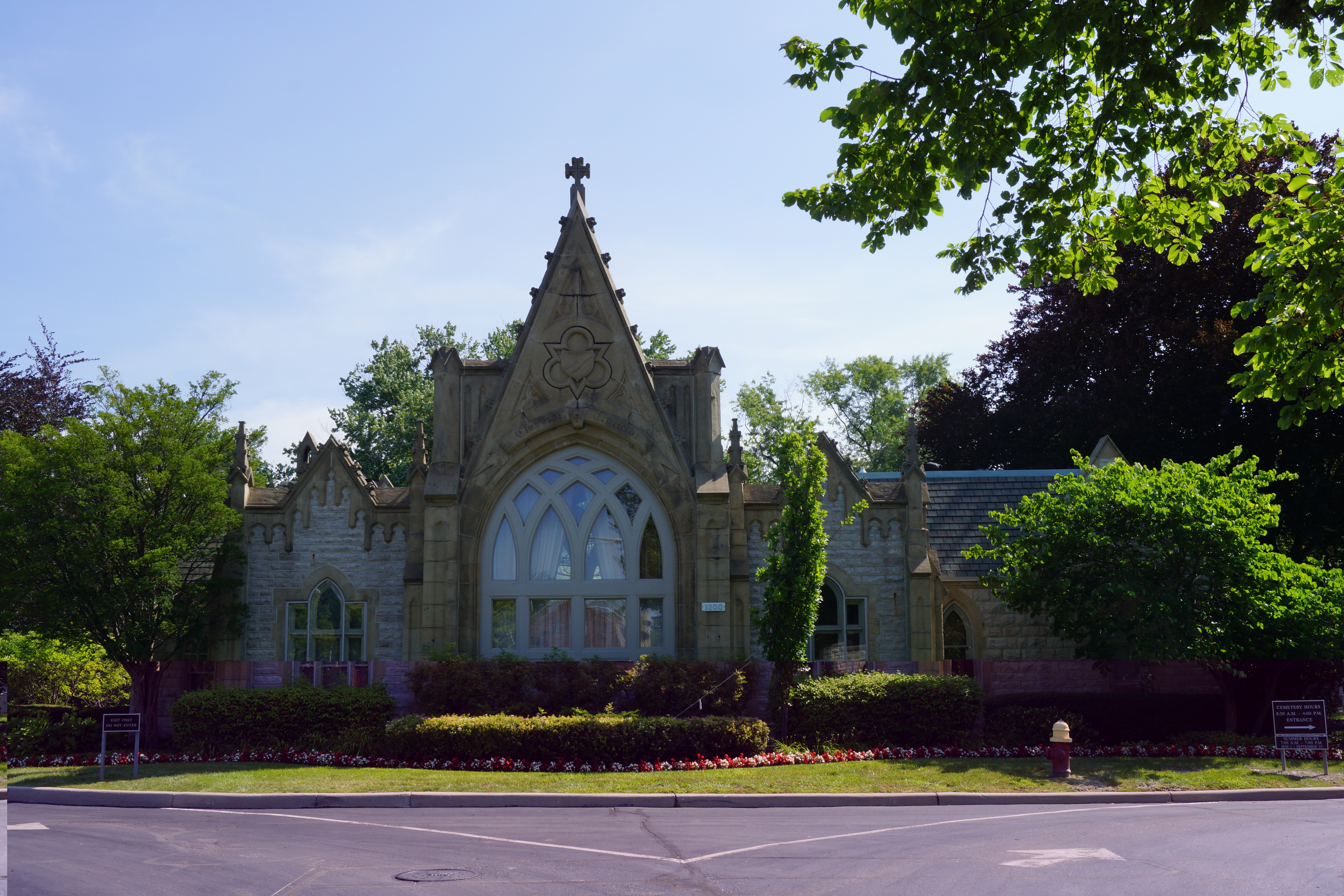
Elmwood Chapel at Elmwood Cemetery in Detroit, Wayne County

- Eastside Historic Cemetery District in Detroit; NRHP-listed
- Elmwood Cemetery in Detroit; NRHP-listed, MSHS-listed
- Eloise Cemetery in Westland
- Glen Eden Lutheran Memorial Park in Livonia
- Mount Carmel Cemetery in Wyandotte
- Mount Elliott Cemetery in Detroit
- Mount Olivet Cemetery in Detroit
- St. Hedwig Cemetery (Michigan) in Dearborn Heights
- William Ganong Cemetery in Westland
- Woodlawn Cemetery in Detroit
- Woodmere Cemetery in Detroit

== See also ==
- Michigan State Historic Preservation Office
- List of cemeteries in the United States
