= Elmwood Cemetery (Detroit) =

- U.S. Historic district – Contributing property
- Michigan State Historic Site
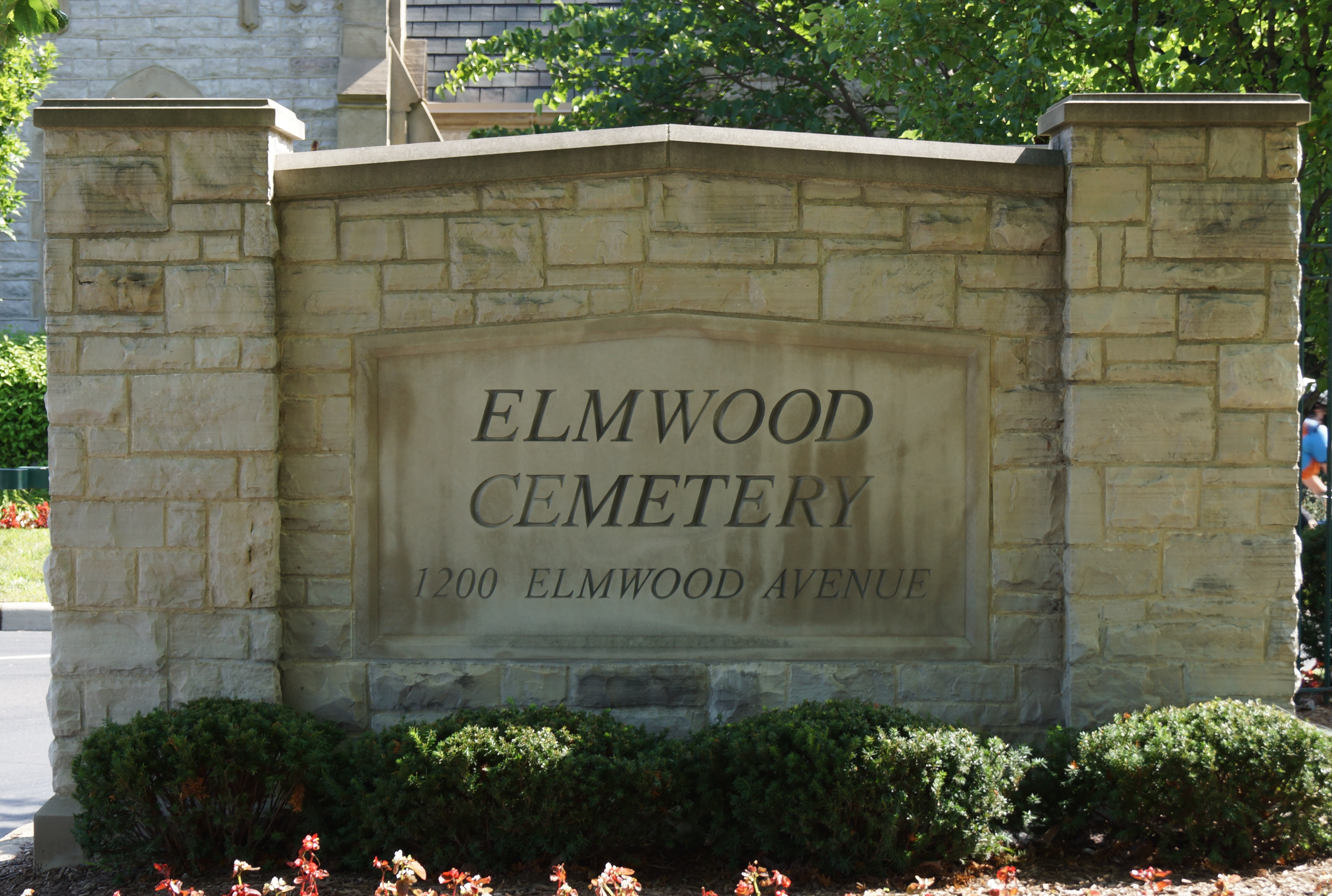
- Location: 1200 Elmwood Avenue Detroit, Michigan 48207
- Coordinates: 42°20′50″N 83°1′7″W
- Built: 1841
- Part of: Eastside Historic Cemetery District (ID82000550)

Significant dates
- Added to NRHP: December 2, 1982
- Designated MSHS: February 21, 1975

Elmwood Cemetery in Detroit is one of Michigan's most important historic cemeteries. Located at 1200 Elmwood Street in Detroit's Eastside Historic Cemetery District, Elmwood is the oldest continuously operating, non-denominational cemetery in Michigan.

== History ==
The cemetery was dedicated October 8, 1846, as a rural cemetery and incorporated as a non-profit corporation by Special Act 62 of the Michigan Legislature on March 5, 1849. The first burial occurred three weeks prior to the dedication on September 10, 1846. Founded by some of early Detroit's leading residents, Elmwood originally covered 42 acres (170,000 m^{2}). Over time, it expanded to encompass 86 acres (350,000 m^{2}) and is the final resting-place of many notable Detroiters as well as ordinary citizens. In 1850, however, the cemetery became slightly smaller when Temple Beth El purchased one-half acre to establish what is now Michigan's oldest Jewish cemetery. The State of Michigan designated it as a State Historic Site in 1975.

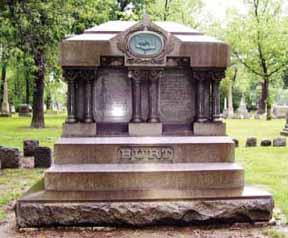
Burt family tombstone

Elmwood was the first fully racially integrated cemetery in the Midwest. A short distance from downtown Detroit, Elmwood continues to serve residents of all ethnic backgrounds and religious beliefs.

Elmwood's park-like grounds containing a gently-flowing stream and low hills were redesigned in 1891 by landscape architect Frederick Law Olmsted. They are based on the design of Mount Auburn Cemetery in Cambridge, Massachusetts.

The Gothic Revival chapel on the grounds was constructed in 1856. It underwent renovation in 1961 and was destroyed by fire in 1976. With a public outpouring of support, the building was restored and continues to play an important role.

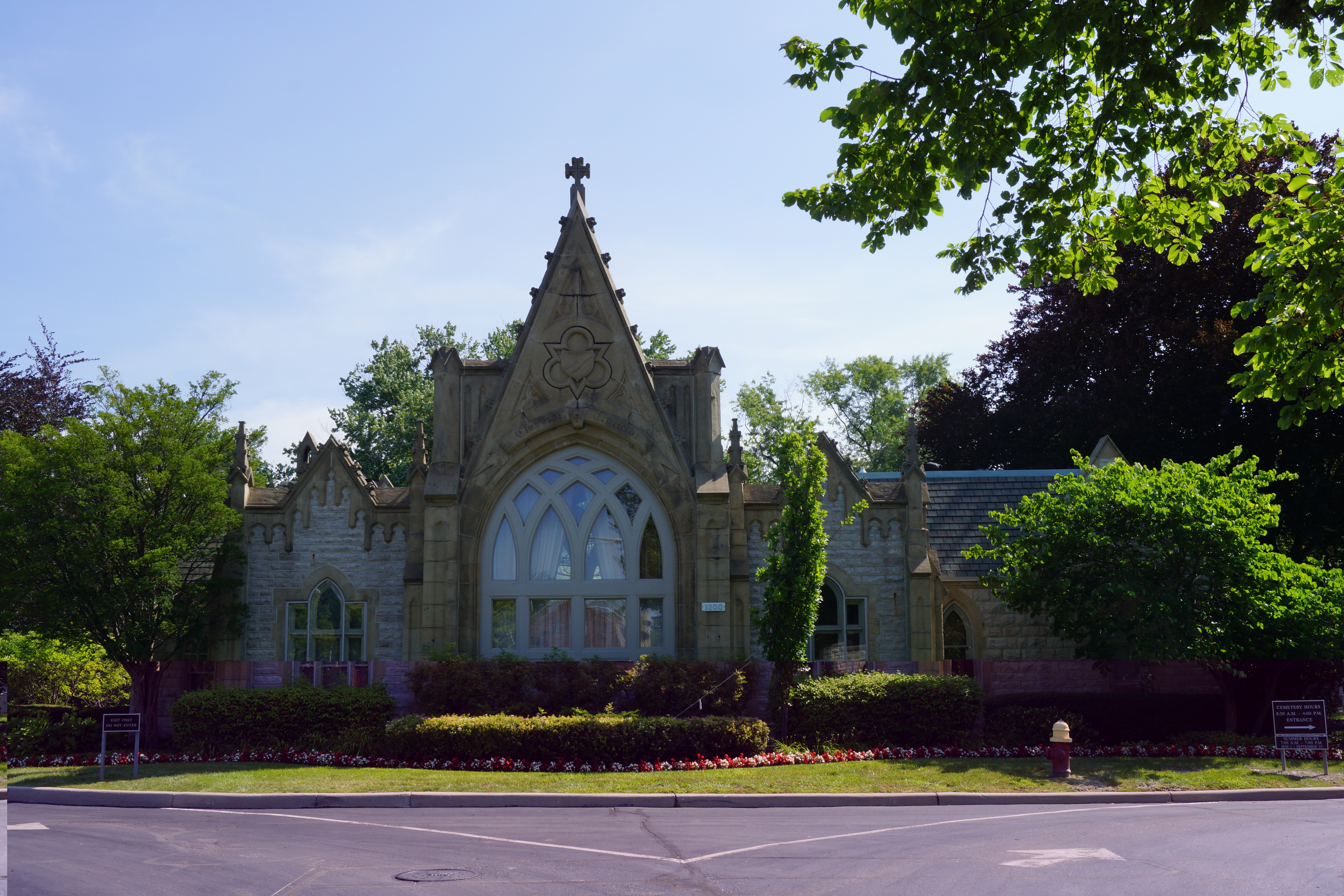
Elmwood Gatehouse

In 1874, the state of Michigan purchased a section to inter Civil War veterans and in 1876, the Firemen's Lot was dedicated with a monument that depicts firefighting equipment and the fire hall that once stood at the corner of the present Renaissance Center on Randolph and Jefferson Avenue. The Civil War section holds 205 graves today.

The Gothic Revival gatehouse was added in 1876 and in 2003 its portal was closed and filled with a reception room designed to harmonize with the historic architecture. The gate was closed because it was unable to accommodate larger vehicles which needed access to the grounds.

== In popular culture ==
The cemetery makes an appearance in the film Detroit 9000 as the scene of a shootout.

== Prominent burials ==
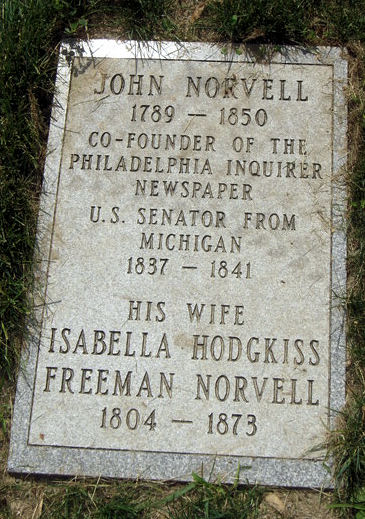
Marker of John Norvell's grave

- Russell A. Alger (1836–1907), Governor of Michigan (1885–1887), U.S. Senator, and U.S. Secretary of War
- William Edmond Armitage (1830–1873), second Bishop of the Episcopal Diocese of Wisconsin (1870–1873)
- John Biddle (1792–1859), delegate to U.S. Congress from Michigan Territory, Mayor of Detroit (1827–1828)
- Henry Billings Brown (1836–1913), Associate Justice of the Supreme Court of the United States (1890–1906)
- Lewis Cass (1782–1866), Michigan Territorial Governor (1813–1831), U.S. Senator, U.S. Secretary of War, U.S. Secretary of State, and the Democratic Party presidential nominee in the 1848 United States presidential election.
- Zachariah Chandler (1813–1879), U.S. Senator from Michigan, U.S. Secretary of the Interior, Mayor of Detroit (1851–1852)
- Philip St. George Cooke (1809–1895), U.S. Civil War General
- Donald M. Dickinson (1846–1917), U.S. Postmaster General (1888–1889)
- J. P. C. Emmons (1818–1877), Michigan State Representative (1848), Florida Attorney General (1872–1873)
- Elon Farnsworth (1799–1847), Attorney General from 1843 to 1845 and Chancellor of Michigan
- William Webb Ferguson (1857–1910), first African-American man elected to the Michigan House of Representatives
- Harry P. Guy (1870–1950), ragtime composer
- Douglass Houghton (1809–1845), geologist and Mayor of Detroit (1842)
- Jacob M. Howard (1805–1871), U.S. Senator from Michigan (1862–1871), helped draft Thirteenth and Fourteenth Amendments to the United States Constitution
- Bela Hubbard (1814–1896), geologist, surveyor
- Jonathan Kearsley (1786–1859), two-time Mayor of Detroit (1826, 1829) and veteran of the War of 1812
- Charles Larned (c. 1787 – 1834), Attorney General of Michigan Territory and veteran of the War of 1812
- Lucius Lyon (1800–1851), U.S. Senator from 1837 to 1839, first congressman from Michigan's second district and a founding father of Grand Rapids, Michigan
- Margaret Mather (1859–1898), Victorian actress
- Nathaniel Mayer (1944–2008), rhythm and blues singer
- James McMillan (1838–1902), U.S. senator from 1889 to 1902
- Robert McClelland (1807–1880), 4th United States Secretary of the Interior
- Charles Merrill (1792–1872), American entrepreneur and lumber tycoon
- Truman H. Newberry (1864–1945), businessman, U.S. Senator from Michigan (1919–1922), Secretary of the Navy
- John Norvell (1789–1850), U.S. Senator (1837–1841), War of 1812 veteran and newspaper editor
- Thomas W. Palmer (1830–1913), U.S. Senator (1883–1889)
- Zina Pitcher (1797–1872), physician and two-time Mayor of Detroit (1840–1841, 1843)
- Andrew Porter (1820–1872), U.S. Army general in the Civil War
- Jerome H. Remick (1867–1931), music publisher
- James Robinson (1753–1868), African-American Revolutionary War and 1812 War Veteran
- Solomon Sibley (1769–1846), delegate to U.S. Congress from Michigan Territory, Territorial Supreme Court Justice, and first Mayor of Detroit (1806) under the first charter
- Fred "Sonic" Smith (1949–1994), guitarist best known for his work with the rock band MC5
- Martha Jean Steinberg (1930–2000), radio personality
- David Stuart (1816–1868), congressman (1853–1855)
- Marcena W. Taylor (1911-1994), Detroit Fire Fighter (1938-1971)
- Sam Thompson (1860–1922), outfielder and Baseball Hall of Fame member
- Hiram Walker (1816–1899), entrepreneur; founder Hiram Walker and Sons Distillery
- Eber Brock Ward (1811–1875), Detroit's first millionaire
- Alpheus S. Williams (1810–1878), American Civil War general and U.S. Representative from Michigan.
- John R. Williams (1782–1854), first and sixth Mayor of Detroit under the second charter (1824–1825, 1830) and namesake of John R. Street
- Thomas Williams (1815–1862), American Civil War general killed at the Battle of Baton Rouge
- Coleman Young (1918–1997), Mayor of Detroit (1974–1994)

== See also ==
- List of burial places of justices of the Supreme Court of the United States
- List of cemeteries in Michigan
