= Maple Grove Cemetery =

Maple Grove Cemetery may refer to:

- Maple Grove Cemetery (Queens), New York City, New York, listed on the National Register of Historic Places in Queens County, New York
- Maple Grove Cemetery (Mason, Michigan), listed on the National Register of Historic Places in Ingham County, Michigan
- Maple Grove Cemetery, Frewsburg, New York
- Maple Grove Cemetery, Hoosick Falls, New York
- Maple Grove Cemetery, Georgetown, Kentucky
