= Marilyn Fisher Lundy =

American businesswoman and philanthropist (1925–2014)

- Born: Marilyn Alice Fisher; May 3, 1925; Detroit, Michigan, U.S.
- Died: June 24, 2014 (aged 89)
- Burial place: Mount Elliott Cemetery
- Education: University of Detroit Mercy
- Occupations: Former president and CEO of the League of Catholic Women
- Years active: 1964–2000
- Spouse: C. Bradford Lundy Jr. (m. 1946)
- Children: 8

Marilyn Fisher Lundy (née Marilyn Alice Fisher; May 3, 1925 – June 24, 2014) was an American businesswoman and philanthropist. As the CEO and president of the League of Catholic Women (later renamed Matrix Human Service), Lundy led the development of several organizations for women and children within Michigan, including educational institutions.

== Early and personal life ==
Lundy was born Marilyn Alice Fisher on May 3, 1925, in Detroit, Michigan, to Edward and Adeline Fisher. She attended the Academy of the Sacred Heart, graduating in 1942.

She graduated from the University of Detroit Mercy in May 1946, with a degree in philosophy and summa cum laude distinction. She married C. Bradford Lundy Jr. in September 1946. They moved to Grosse Pointe Shores, Michigan in 1958, and attended the Our Lady Star of the Sea Parish. Lundy had 8 children.

== Career ==
In 1964, Lundy began serving in the board of nonprofit organization League of Catholic Women, an organization serving to improve educational opportunities for people. She became the president in 1969, and later the CEO. The organization was later renamed the Matrix Human Services. While working with the organization, Lundy led the development of several projects, including the Simon House, for female victims of HIV/AIDS, the Seton Center, a general center for women's issues, Healthy Start, for economically disadvantaged pregnant women or new mothers, W.I.C. (Women, Infants and Children), providing support for women and children, and the Casa Maria Family Services Agency, providing alternative education for children aged 10 to 13. In 1994, the Casa Maria Family Services Agency became one of the state's first nine accredited charter schools. Lundy helped develop the Marilyn F. Lundy Academy, a charter school named after her.

Lundy served in the Michigan Department of Education from 1988 to 1996, including as its vice president for a year. Lundy also served as the president for the Citizens for Educational Freedom from 1977 to 1988. In 1999, Lundy was declared a "Michiganian of the Year" by The Detroit News. Lundy was inducted into the Michigan Women's Hall of Fame in 2000 for her work in education. She retired the same year.

== Death and legacy ==
Lundy died on June 24, 2014, at the age of 89. At the time of her death, she had 22 grandchildren and 30 great-grandchildren. A funeral mass was held on July 7 at the Our Lady Star of the Sea Parish. She was buried in Mount Elliott Cemetery. In 2014, Mount Sinai Hospital launched The Marilyn Lundy Hospice Palliative Care Community Nursing Award, honoring Lundy.

== Awards and honors ==
Year	Award	Organization	Ref.
1991	Wansboro Award	Academy of the Sacred Heart	
1999	Michiganian of the Year	The Detroit News	
2000	Hall of Fame	Michigan Women's Hall of Fame	
