= Harry P. Guy =

American composer (1870–1950)

- Born: July 17, 1870
- Died: September 16, 1950 (aged 80)
- Era: Ragtime

Harry P. Guy (July 17, 1870 – September 16, 1950) was an American ragtime composer.

Guy was born in Zanesville, Ohio, where he wrote his first compositions. He then moved to New York, where he studied under Victor Herbert and started his career writing musical arrangements. He later moved to Detroit in 1895, where he worked first for Whitney-Warner and then Willard Bryant, writing songs for many famous artists of the era. He also composed arrangements for the University of Michigan and University of Detroit. His 1898 song, Echos from the Snowball Club, has become a ragtime classic.

Later in life, Guy fell into obscurity, living alone and in poverty until he died on September 16, 1950. He was buried at Elmwood Cemetery in Detroit in an unmarked grave. His burial place was eventually recognized in 2003 when a group of local enthusiasts and citizens held a ceremony and placed a commemorative marker.

== List of compositions ==
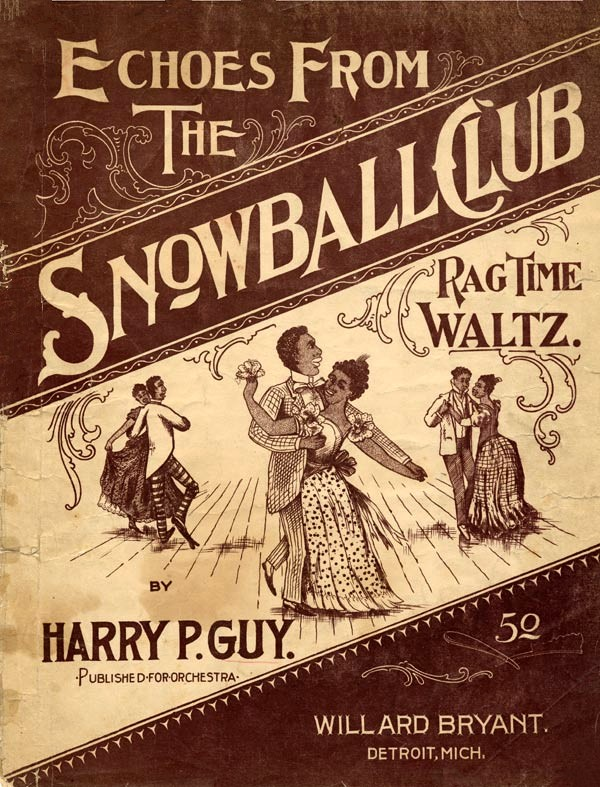
Echoes from the Snowball Club (1898)

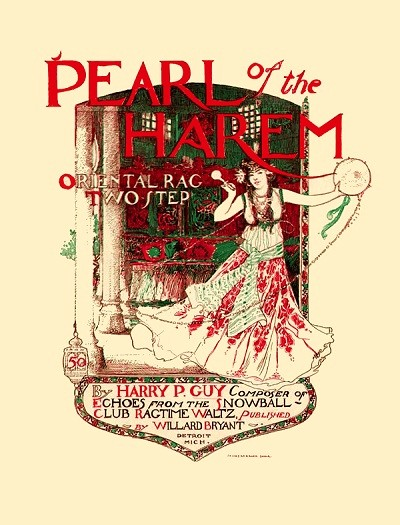
Pearl of the Harem (1901)

- The Floweret (1887)
- My Wooing (1888)
- When the Dew Begems the Lea (1889)
- Echoes from the Snowball Club (1898)
- Now For a Stranger Don't Cast Me Aside (1898)
- Cleanin' Up in Georgia (1899)
- Belle of the Creoles (1899)
- Pearl of the Harem (1901)
- Pepper Pot Rag (1901)
- Daughters of Dahomey (1902)
- Song of the Western Hunter (1902)
- Down in Mobile (1904)
- Walkin' and Talkin' (1906)
- Sixty-Six (1907)
- As Long As There Is Love (I Will Love You) (with Eddie McGrath) (1914)
- Love's Eternity (1915)
- We'll Stand Our Flag and the United States (1917)
- Yankee's Doodle In the Flight To Stay (1918)
- You and I (1921)
- That Home In Paradise (Love and Home Forever) (1921)
- Big Hearted Baby (with Raymond B. Egan) (1928)
