= Marcena Taylor =

American firefighter

Marcena W. Taylor
- Born: Marcena W. Taylor; January 25, 1911; Chattanooga, Tennessee
- Died: August 14, 1994 (aged 83); Detroit, Michigan
- Education: Livingstone College, Salisbury, North Carolina
- Occupation: Fire Fighter
- Years active: 33
- Known for: One of the first African-American Fire Fighters hired by the City of Detroit Fire Department.

Marcena W. Taylor , also known as Marcellus Taylor (January 25, 1911 – August 14, 1994) was an American Fire Fighter in Detroit, Michigan, and one of the first African Americans hired by the Detroit Fire Department in 1938. His career marked a significant milestone in the integration of municipal services and the Civil Service in the United States.

== Early life ==
Taylor was born on January 25, 1911, in Chattanooga, Tennessee. He later moved to Detroit in 1927, where he attended historic Sidney D. Miller Intermediate School and Detroit's Northwestern High School, where he graduated with honors. He subsequently attended Livingstone College, an historically Black Christian college (HBCU), where he earned a Bachelor's degree in English and Sociololgy.

== Career ==
In 1933, the Detroit Fire Department was made up of 1,700 members, none of whom were of African descent. In that year, Detroit Mayor Richard William Reading, responding to pressure from local civil rights leader Snow F. Grigsby and his Detroit Civil Rights Committee, issued an order to the Civil Service Commission requiring acceptance of applications from Black candidates. Additionally, the top ten applicants of the relevant group(s) were to be hired forthwith, regardless of race or color. Taylor was among the top-ranked candidates on the Detroit firefighter eligibility list in the mid-1930s and was hired in 1938 alongside fellow applicant Marvin White, another person of color, becoming the first African American firefighters in the department.Assigned to the DFD Engine Company No. 34 on Detroit's near west side, they both reported for duty on July 30, 1938.

Upon arrival, Taylor and White faced intense racial hostility, including protests by white residents and opposition from fellow firefighters. They were subjected to segregation within the firehouse, including separate eating arrangements and living quarters. They were also met with opposition from the local union, the Detroit Fire Fighters Association, and prohibited from joining. Despite these challenges, Taylor advanced through the ranks, becoming the first African American Sergeant in 1952, Captain in 1963, and Battalion Chief in 1969.

== Historical significance ==
The Detroit Fire Department was formally established in the year 1860. Both Taylor and Marvin White's' hiring, some 78 years later, came at a time when African Americans faced systemic exclusion from public employment. His appointment is considered a milestone in the civil rights history of Detroit, reflecting broader efforts to desegregate municipal services.

== Legacy ==
Marcena Taylor is regarded as a pioneer who helped open opportunities for African Americans in firefighting and public service. His career paved the way for future generations of Black firefighters in Detroit. He retired from the Detroit Fire Department in 1971, with thirty-three years of service. Chief Taylor died August 14, 1994, and is laid to rest at Detroit’s historic Elmwood Cemetery, Fireman’s Fund lot.

== Bibliography ==
- Latzman Moon, Elaine (1993), Untold Tales, Unsung Heroes: An Oral History of Detroit's African American Community, 1918-1967, Wayne State University Press, ISBN 9780814324653.
