= Mount Carmel Cemetery (Wyandotte, Michigan) =

Cemetery in Wayne County, Michigan

Coordinates: 42.213°N 83.162°W

- Interactive map of Mount Carmel Cemetery

Details
- Established: 1865
- Location: Wyandotte, Michigan
- Size: 11 acres (4.5 ha)

Mount Carmel Cemetery is located in Wyandotte, Michigan, in the United States. Established in 1865, Mount Carmel Cemetery is an active cemetery. The original cemetery was 10 acres (40,000 m^{2}) holding over 8,000 interments. An additional section of one acre was added in November 2004. The grounds offer a columbarium, traditional, and green burials.

The Roman Catholic Archdiocese of Detroit oversees the cemetery grounds.

== Famous interments ==
- Salvatore Giannola. Born in Sicily, Italy- 1889 - died October 2, 1919. Organized crime figure. Brother of Tony Giannola. Assumed control of the family in January 1919. A month after his brother's murder, Sam Giannola survived an attempt on his life which killed his brother-in-law Pasquale D'Anna. Three weeks later, John Vitale's son and two others were shot in the lobby of the Wayne County Jail. Sam Giannola was charged with murder but acquitted. After a reluctant peace treaty in May 1919, Giannola attempted to ease himself out of the business, but was shot dead in front of the American State Bank at Monroe and Russell streets on October 2, 1919, by three men, one of them being his personal bodyguard. His funeral was one of the most elegant and heartfelt in Detroit at the time.
- Vito Giannola. Born December 10, 1872 - Died September 17, 1947. Organized crime figure. Older brother to Sam and Tony Giannola. Vito was the lesser of the trio and managed to survive the gang war that took the lives of his brothers, dying of natural causes at the age of 72. Both Salvatore and Vito were a part of the Family of Detroit mafia.
