= Fletcher Site =

- U.S. National Register of Historic Places
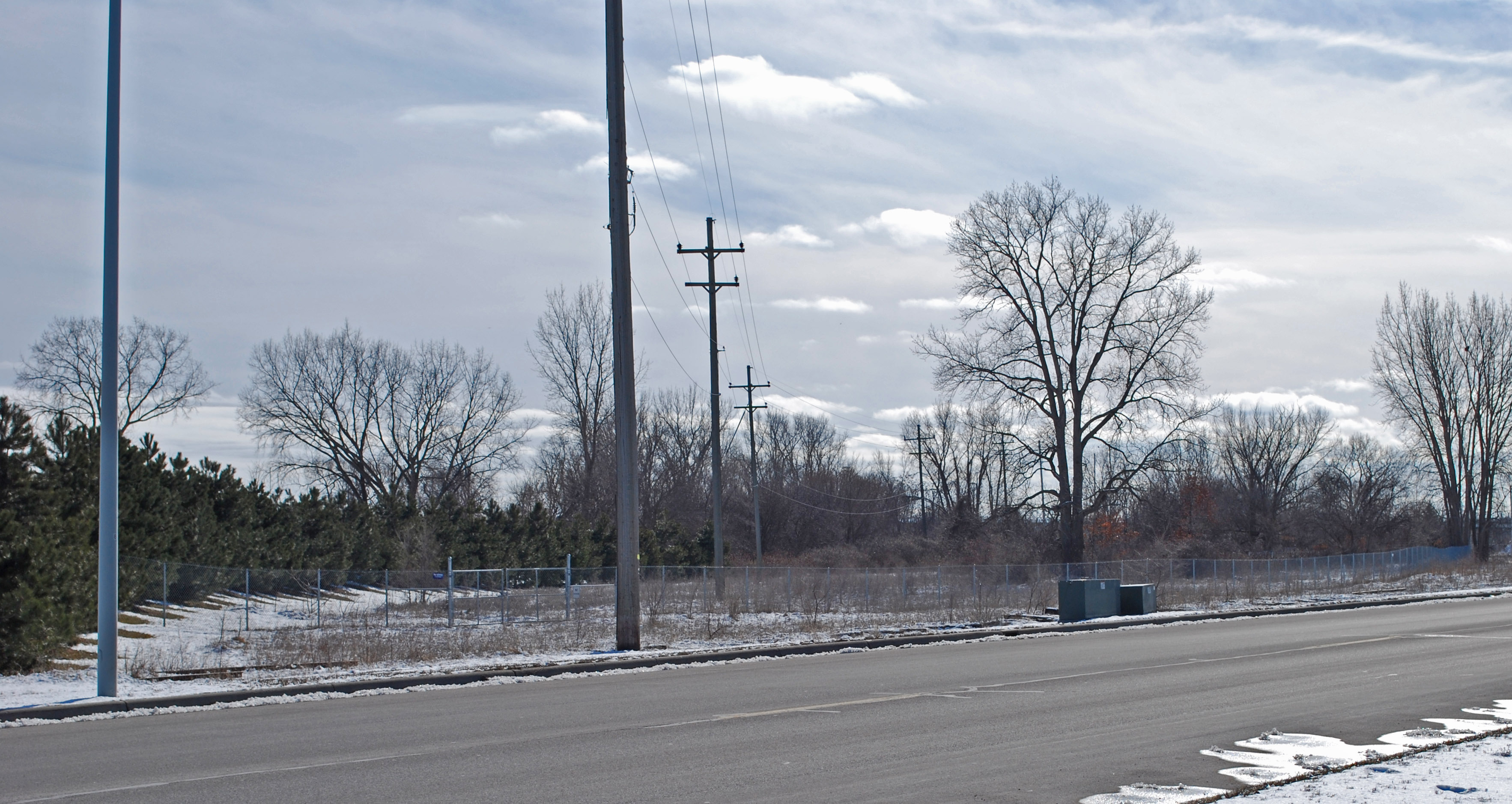

- Location within Michigan Location within the United States
- Location: Btw Marquette Ave. and the Saginaw River, Bay City, Michigan
- Coordinates: 43°36′30″N 83°53′30″W
- Area: less than one acre
- NRHP reference No.: 71001018
- Added to NRHP: April 16, 1971

The Fletcher Site, also designated 20BY28, is a Native American cemetery and archaeological site, located on the west bank of the Saginaw River in Bay City, Michigan. It was listed on the National Register of Historic Places in 1971.

== History ==
It is likely that occupation of the area around the Fletcher Site dates back to the Early Woodland period. However, trade goods found in the cemetery portion of the site date the burials to the mid-1700s. Manuscripts from this time indicate that the area around Saginaw Bay was inhabited at the time by Odawa and Ojibwe people. Maps indicate the presence of a village at the site of this burial ground, and trade goods found in the site date the cemetery to about this time period. There is no record of this village after 1765, and it seems likely that the settlement was disbanded around this time.

The Fletcher Site was discovered in modern times during construction activities in 1967. Archaeologists from Michigan State University excavated the site in 1967, 1968, and 1970.

== Description ==
The Fletcher Site is located on the outer bank at a bend in the Saginaw River only a few miles upstream from Saginaw Bay. The elevation of the site is only a few feet above that of Lake Huron. When occupied, the site was likely directly on the shore of the river.

Remains of 93 individuals from 85 grave sites were recovered during archaeological excavations. At least two dozen other graves were completely destroyed. Graves were laid out in at least five rows, with bodies interred in wooden boxes apparently aligned with the direction of the rising sun. European trade goods, including beads, knives, and silver, were placed with the bodies.
