= Copper Harbor Cemetery =

Historic cemetery in Keweenaw County, Michigan, US

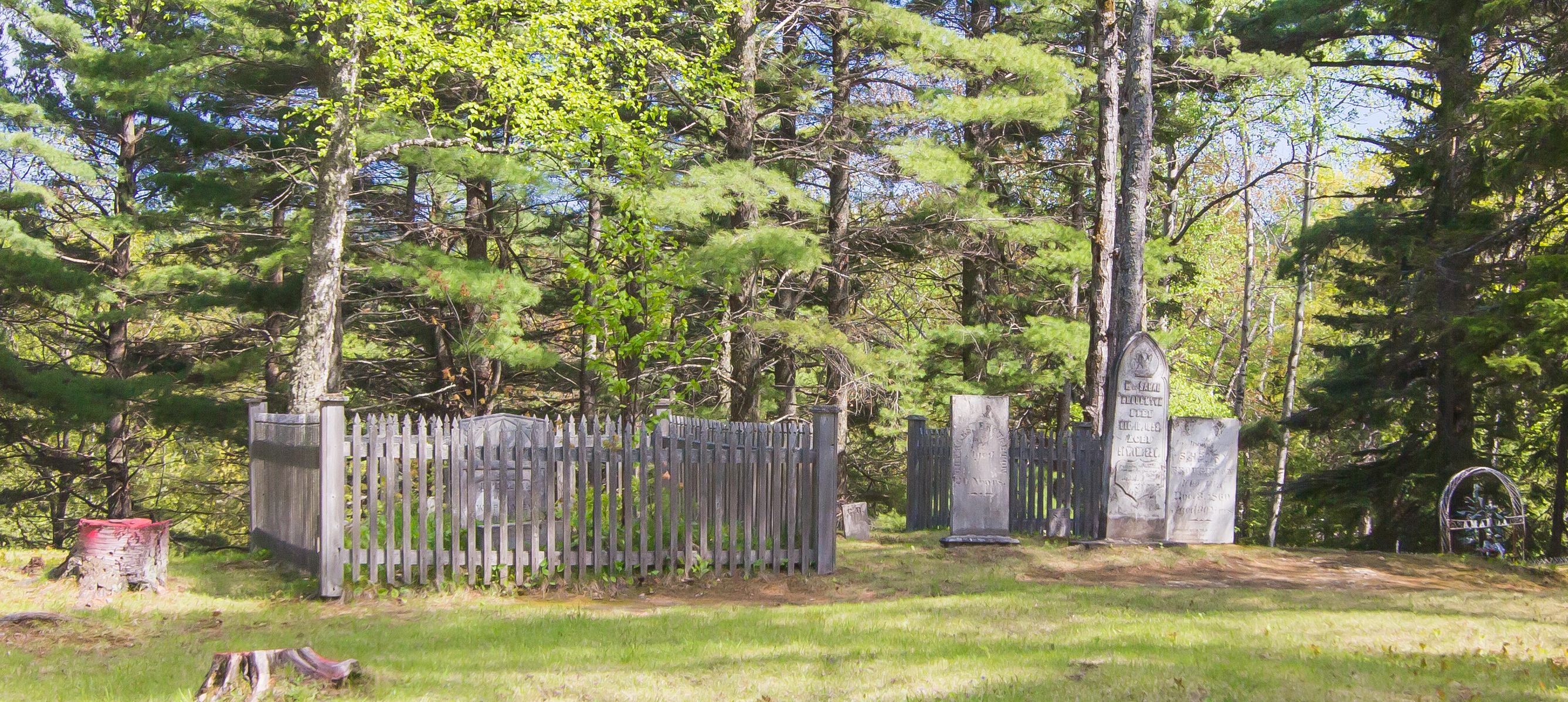

- Location within Michigan
- 47°28′02″N 87°53′45″W
- Location: US 41, west of M-26, Copper Harbor

History
- Founded: 1853

Michigan State Historic Site
- Designated: January 8, 1981

The Copper Harbor Cemetery is a cemetery located on US 41 west of M-26 in Copper Harbor, Michigan. It was listed as a Michigan State Historic Site on January 8, 1981.

Burials occurred from 1853 through the present day. Twelve graves are marked with dates prior to 1900.

== See also ==
- List of Michigan State Historic Sites in Keweenaw County, Michigan
