= Saint Ignatius Church and Cemetery =

Historic site in Emmet County, Michigan, US

- U.S. National Register of Historic Places
- U.S. Historic district
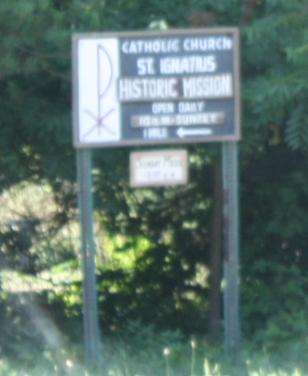

- Location within Michigan Location within the United States
- Interactive map
- Location: 101 N. Lamkin Rd., Good Hart, Michigan
- Coordinates: 45°33′6″N 85°6′56″W
- Area: 1.5 acres (0.61 ha)
- Built: 1889
- Architectural style: Gothic Revival
- NRHP reference No.: 06001328
- Added to NRHP: January 31, 2007

Saint Ignatius Church and Cemetery is a historic church and cemetery at 101 N. Lamkin Road in Good Hart, Michigan, US. The church was added to the Michigan Historical Register in 1976 and the National Register of Historic Places in 2007.

== History ==
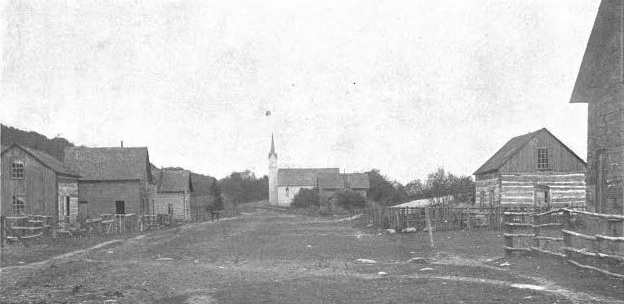
Middle Village (Good Hart) Michigan in 1915 – St Ignatius Church in the center

The area around what is now Good Hart has been an Odawa village (formerly known as Wa-Ga-Nak-A-Sa or Middle Village) since at least the 1700s. In 1741, a Roman Catholic chapel was established at this location in a bark longhouse. The first structure was replaced by a more substantial version, dedicated by Father Frederic Baraga, in 1833. That church was destroyed by fire on Easter Sunday, April 21, 1889.

Construction immediately began on the current church as a replacement. Father Servatius Altmicks from Harbor Springs hired a local carpenter to manage the construction, and much of the work was done by the local Odawa. The new church was dedicated by Rt. Reverend Bishop Richter on September 13, 1889.

The church has undergone a substantial restoration and is open to the public for Sunday mass in July and August, and for weddings and funerals. It is one of the four churches making up the Catholic community of L'Arbre Croche.

== Description ==
Saint Ignatius Church is a white-painted wooden structure covered with clapboard, with a tall wooden steeple. Adjacent to the church is the Middle Village Cemetery, which contains rows of white crosses marking gravesites.
