= Martha Jean Steinberg =

American radio personality and pastor

Martha Jean "The Queen" Steinberg (September 9, 1930 – January 29, 2000) was an influential African-American radio broadcaster and later was also the pastor of her own church.

She was born Martha Jean Jones in Memphis, Tennessee. Her first radio job was on Memphis's WDIA starting in 1954 after winning a contest. There, she was one of the first female disc jockeys in the United States, with a program that included the latest R&B hits along with the typical "household hints" programming that was de rigueur at the time for female radio personalities. She was given the nickname "The Queen" while working there.

In 1963 she moved to Detroit, Michigan, where she was heard on WCHB and then throughout the late 1960s and 1970s on WJLB. On July 23, 1967, Steinberg convinced WJLB to cancel its normal evening programming and she did an on-air program calling for people to calm down and stop rioting. It has been suggested that this prevented the 1967 Detroit Riot from being worse than it was. During her time at WJLB, she led the station's on-air staff in protest of the fact that the station at the time had no African-American employees outside of the air staff.

She became an ordained minister in the 1970s and began using the sign-off "God loves you and I love you". In 1980, WJLB converted from AM to the FM dial (where it remains to this day), and Steinberg's show was dropped in the process. The former WJLB (AM) became WMZK with an ethnic format. In 1982, Steinberg purchased WMZK-AM and changed the call letters to WQBH in order to offer more gospel music-oriented programming. Steinberg remained on the air at WQBH (1400 on the AM dial) until her death. WQBH is now WDTK.

She had a cameo role as a television show host in the 1973 film Detroit 9000. In 2017 she was inducted into the Rhythm & Blues Hall of Fame. She was inducted into the Michigan Women's Hall of Fame in 1998.

Steinberg died in 2000 and is buried in Detroit's Elmwood Cemetery.

She is featured in an episode of Little America on AppleTV.

== See also ==
- WDTK
