= South Berrien Center Union Church and Cemetery =

Historic site in Berrien County, Michigan, US

- U.S. National Register of Historic Places
- U.S. Historic district
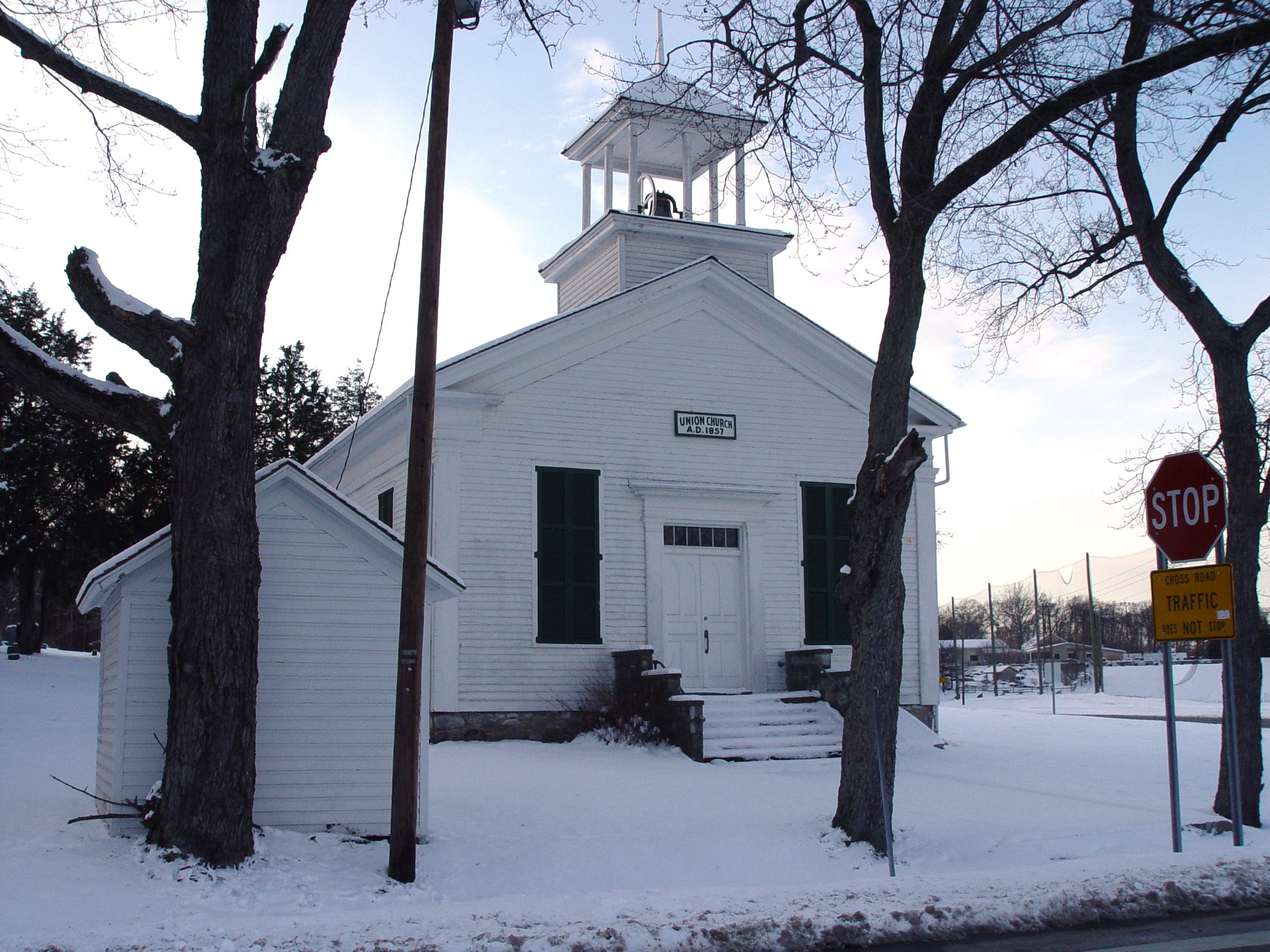

- Location within Michigan Location within the United States
- Interactive map
- Location: 10408 M-140, Berrien Township, Michigan
- Coordinates: 41°55′46″N 86°16′19″W
- Area: 5.5 acres (2.2 ha)
- Built: 1857
- Built by: H.W. Rugg
- Architectural style: Greek Revival
- NRHP reference No.: 02001506
- Added to NRHP: December 12, 2002

South Berrien Center Union Church and Cemetery is a historic church and cemetery at 10408 M-140 in Berrien Township, Michigan. It was built in 1858 and added to the National Register of Historic Places in 2002.

== History ==
Berrien Township was first settled by Europeans in 1827, and by the 1850s there were nearly 1000 residents. Berrien Center was established in 1857 as the site of the township's only post office. That same year, a union church organization, known as the "Union Church District," was founded by local residents for the purpose of establishing a permanent cemetery and construct a church accessible to multiple Protestant denominations. The organization purchased two acres of land at this site, and contracted with H.W. Rugg of Niles to construct a church. The church was dedicated in July 1858. Additional acreage for the cemetery was purchased in 1869, and by the end of the 19th century the grounds had expanded to the current 5.5 acres (2.2 ha).

The church served a number of denominations, including the Methodist Episcopal society, Dunkards, and the Berrien Centre Free Will Baptist Church. The Union Church Aid Society was founded in 1891 to maintain the church, and has been responsible for the building since that time. However, the various congregations dissolved or joined other churches, and the last regular service held in the church was around 1919. However, repairs and renovations have been made to the church, including new pews in 1916, new concrete front steps in 1925, and the addition of electricity in 1956. Today the Union Church Aid Society still maintains the church building, and Berrien Township has assumed management and maintenance of the cemetery.

== Description ==
The Union Church is a wooden Greek Revival structure on a rubble foundation measuring 52 feet by 36 feet. The church is covered with clapboard and has a gabled roof with classical cornices with returns and is topped with a square open plan belfry. A flight of concrete steps leads to the front center entrance, which is a pair of double doors flanked by pilasters. A second entry at grade level is at the rear. The church has seven double hing windows (two in front, three on one side and two on the other).

On the interior, there is a vestibule near the entrance and a main auditorium with plaster walls and wooden flooring. The auditorium has two rows of pews, with additional hinged seating built into the side walls. In front is a pulpit in a raised floor.

The cemetery grounds are laid out in rectangular form, with three lanes providing access. Maple and blue spruce trees are planted in the cemetery. Monuments in the cemetery date from the latter half of the 19th century through the 20th century, and include predominantly marble and granite monuments, but also a few concrete and bronze ones.
