= William Ganong Cemetery =

Closed historic cemetery in Wayne County, Michigan

- Interactive map of William Ganong Cemetery

Details
- Established: 1832
- Closed: Closed to new burials
- Location: Westland, Michigan
- Coordinates: 42°16′28″N 83°20′19″W
- No. of interments: Approximately 350

William Ganong Cemetery is a cemetery located in Westland, Michigan, US. It is named after a local farmer who set aside a portion of his farm land for burials in 1832. It contains approximately 350 interments. It is currently owned by Wayne County and no longer open for further burials.

The cemetery's main claim to fame is having a reputation among ghost enthusiasts, who consider the grounds to be haunted. Many visitors to the cemetery have reported seeing apparitions flitting among the headstones, and there has even been several minor car accidents on the road near the cemetery, with people claiming that they saw something run out into the road in front of them.

== Notable burials ==
William Ganong Cemetery has the interred remains of over 25 members of the Ganong family and many other locals, including several veterans of the Civil War, veterans of both World War I and World War II, and one veteran of the Mexican–American War. Albert Ganong, who perished in Libby Prison, Richmond, Virginia, at age 17 is among the veterans buried there.
