= Great Lakes National Cemetery =

Veterans cemetery in Oakland County, Michigan

Coordinates: 42°51′02″N 83°37′05″W

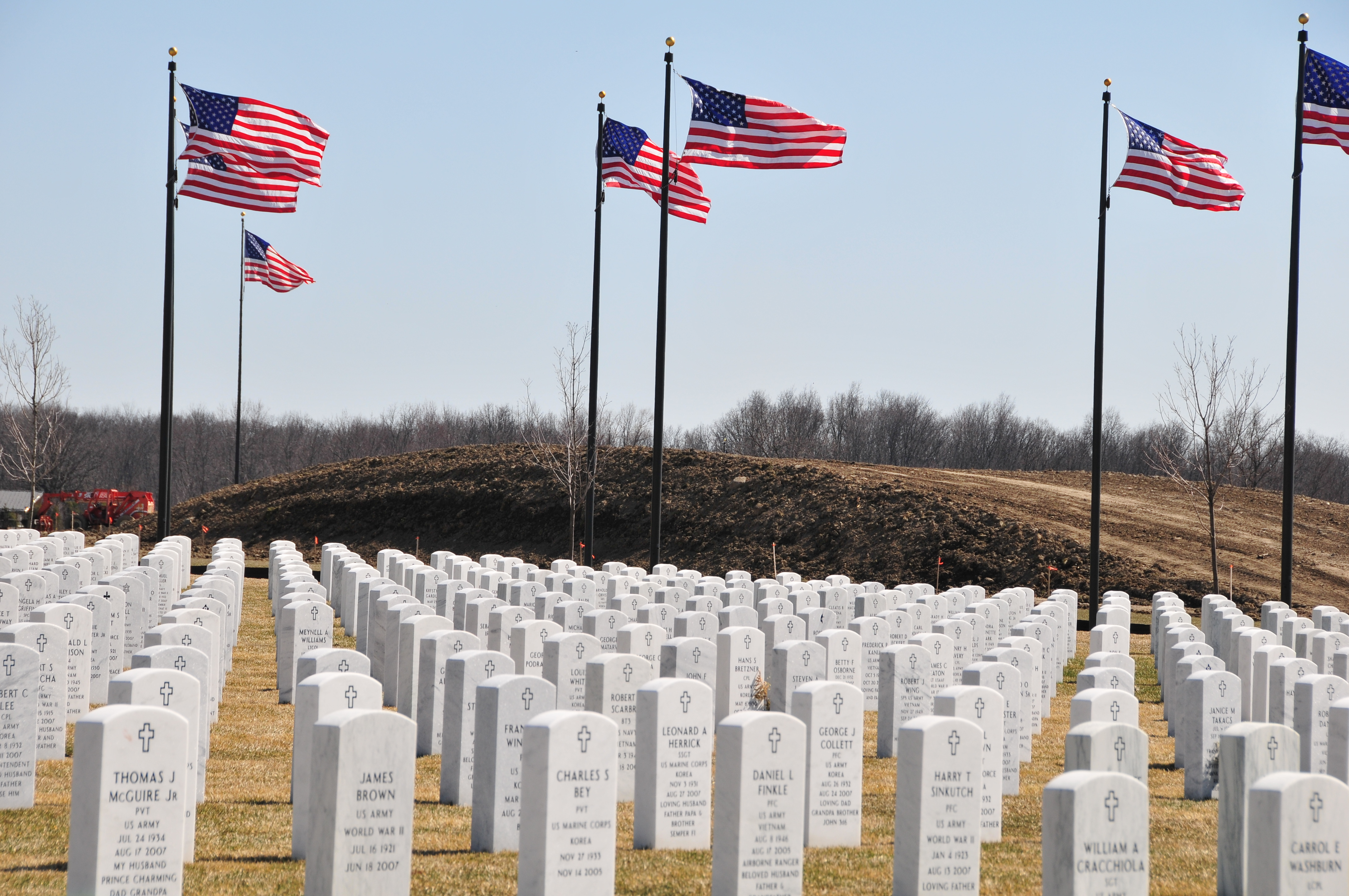
- Great Lakes National Cemetery, April 2009
- Interactive map of Great Lakes National Cemetery

Details
- Established: 2005
- Location: Holly, Michigan
- Type: United States National Cemetery
- Size: 544 acres (220 ha)
- No. of interments: Over 65,000

Great Lakes National Cemetery is a United States National Cemetery located in Holly, Oakland County, Michigan. It was established in 2005, and is one of two national cemeteries in Michigan (the other being Fort Custer). Administered by the United States Department of Veterans Affairs, the cemetery covers 544 acres and, as of 2024, had over 55,000 interments. This is the largest Cemetery in Michigan and the 6th busiest Veterans Cemetery in the United States.

== History ==
The land of the cemetery was once owned by the industrialist and Spanish–American War veteran, Bryson Dexter Horton, founder of Square D electronics. The first interment took place on October 17, 2005.

== Notable interments ==
- Allan Barnes (1949–2016), jazz musician
- Lynn Chandnois (1923–2011), professional football player and World War II veteran
- Mack Rice (1933–2016), songwriter and singer
- Alexander Jefferson (1921–2022), Tuskegee Airmen, former POW, Author
- Guy Stern (1922–2023), German-American educator and writer
