= Morgan West Wheatland Cemetery =

Cemetery in Mecosta County, Michigan, US

- U.S. National Register of Historic Places
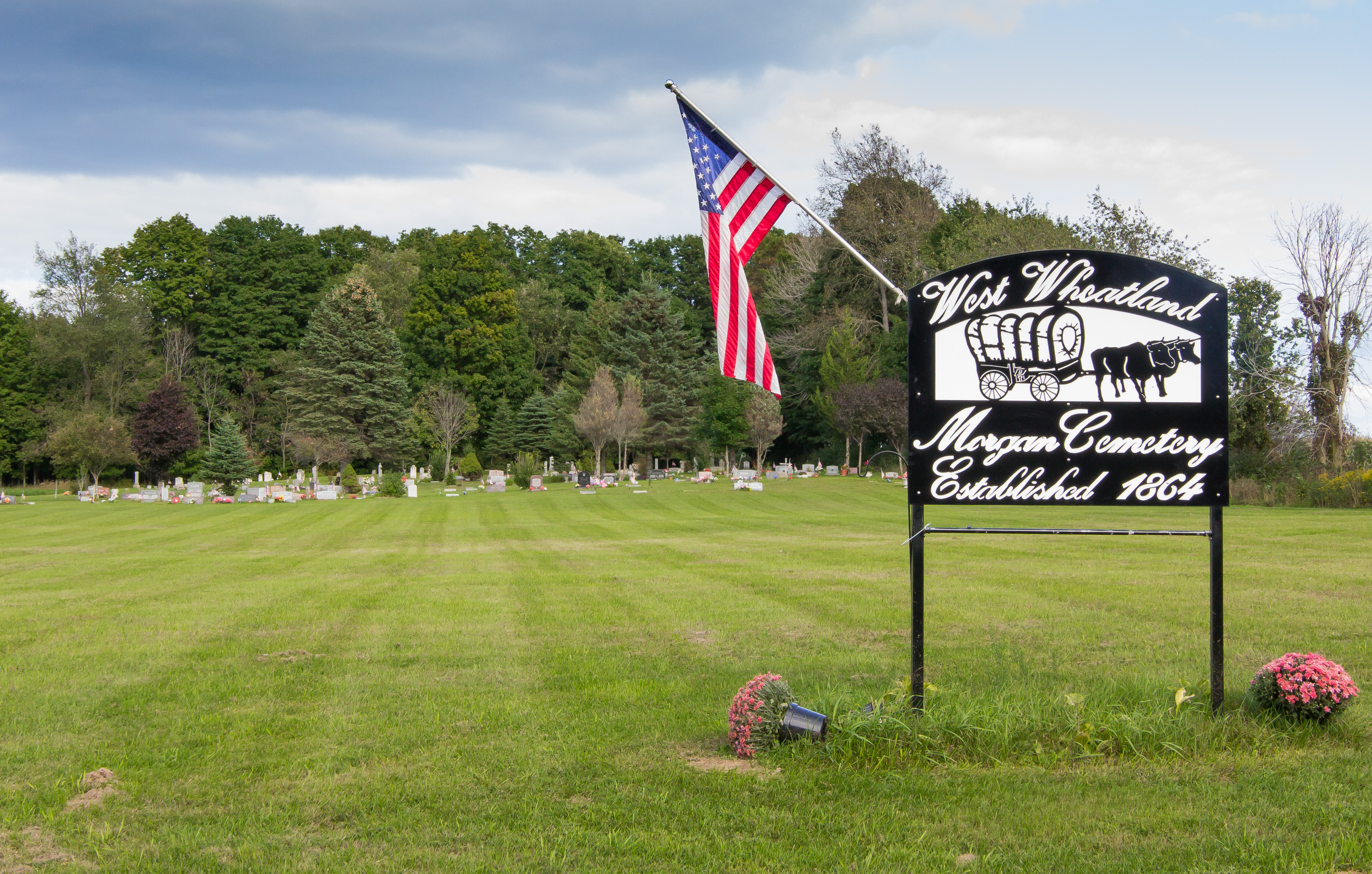

- Location within Michigan Location within the United States
- Interactive map
- Location: 55th Ave. between 10 & 11 Mile Rds., Wheatland Township, Mecosta County, Michigan
- Coordinates: 43°36′55″N 85°11′34″W
- Area: less than one acre
- Built: 1864
- NRHP reference No.: 10441044
- Added to NRHP: December 16, 2014

The Morgan West Wheatland Cemetery is a cemetery located on 55th Avenue between 10 & 11 Mile Roads in Wheatland Township, Mecosta County, Michigan. It was listed on the National Register of Historic Places in 2014.

== History ==
Beginning in the early 1860s, African Americans began migrating to Isabella, Mecosta, and Montcalm Counties in Michigan. These settlers, primarily from Ohio, but also from Ontario and other parts of Michigan, were drawn by the promise of inexpensive land in the Homestead Act of 1860. This cemetery was informally established in 1864, when Ann Marie (Calliman) Guy, who arrived in the area in 1861 with her husband James Guy, was buried here. Although there was no formal action to set aside the property as a cemetery, over 50 burials took place here in the 19th century.

In 1867, Daniel and Mille Cummins Porter, who had arrived in Mecosta County in 1861, purchased a 120-acre farm which included the cemetery land. They eventually left the land to their foster son Aaron Morgan. In 1896, Aaron and Joanna Morgan bequeathed a half-acre parcel of land to the West Wheatland Union Cemetery Association. In 1954, Hubert J. and Bernadette Lehnert, then owners of the Morgan Farm, added another two acres. As of 2013, the entire cemetery housed about 400 burial sites, with about 225 in the old section. The cemetery is still in use.

== Description ==
The Morgan West Wheatland Cemetery is a rectangular, 2-1/2 acre burial ground fronting on 55th Avenue. Graves are located in the rear of the property, while the front is open. A two-track lane leads to the rear portion of the cemetery. The cemetery contains over 380 marked graves and another 25 unmarked graves. The cemetery is maintained and neatly trimmed.

Graves are laid out in a rectangular grid. Monuments include a range of styles seen in the Midwest, and are constructed from marble, sandstone, limestone, granite, fieldstone, and concrete. They include tablet headstones, pedestals with urn tops, slant-face markers, flat-top markers, and others. Government-issued monuments for veterans are also included. Four monuments or planters are built from fieldstone, and a number of concrete markers, some apparently homemade. A number of early markers display Christian symbolism, including a weeping willow, flowers and foliage, doves, and clasped hands.
