= Eastside Historic Cemetery District =

Historic district in Michigan, United States

- U.S. National Register of Historic Places
- U.S. Historic district
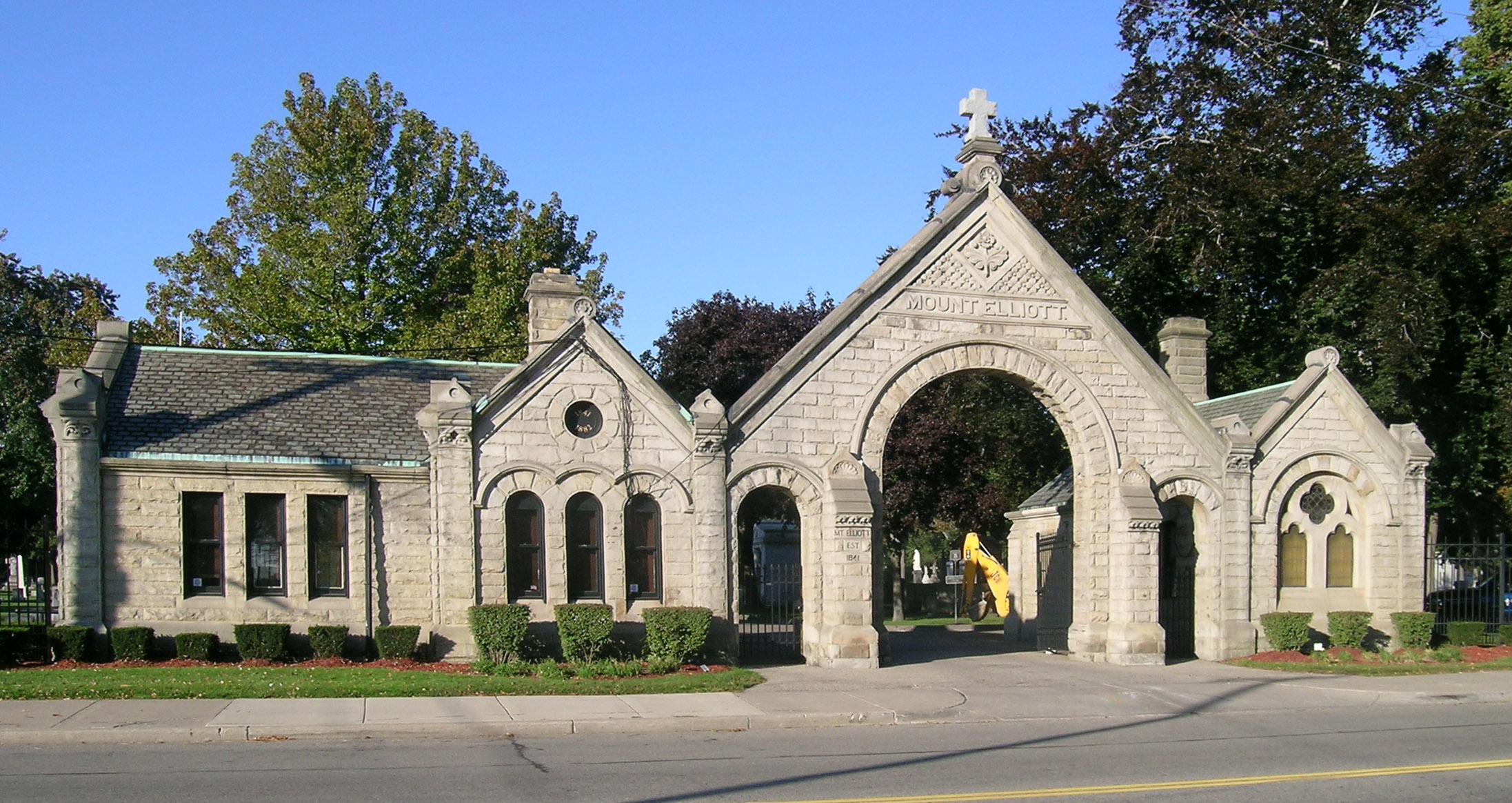
- Mount Elliott Cemetery front gate, built 1882
- Interactive map
- Location: Detroit, Michigan, U.S.
- Coordinates: 42°20′59″N 83°1′5″W
- Built: 1841
- NRHP reference No.: 82000550
- Added to NRHP: December 2, 1982

The Eastside Historic Cemetery District is a historic district bounded by Elmwood Avenue, Mt. Elliott Avenue, Lafayette Street, and Waterloo Street in Detroit, Michigan. The district consists of three separate cemeteries: Mount Elliott Cemetery (Catholic, established 1841), Elmwood Cemetery (Protestant, established 1846), and the Lafayette Street Cemetery (Jewish, established 1850). The district was listed on the National Register of Historic Places in 1982.

== Mount Elliott Cemetery ==
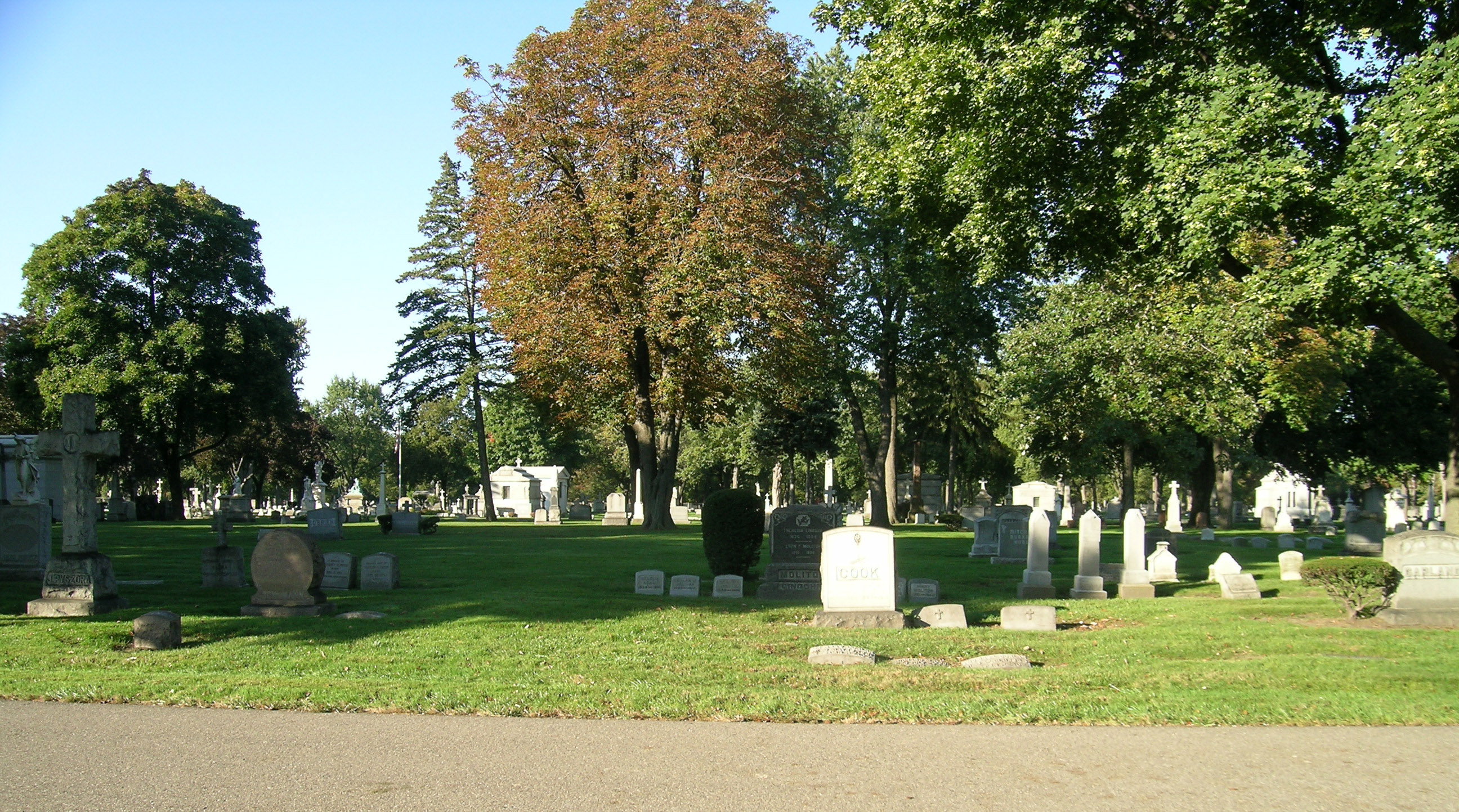
Mount Elliott Cemetery

Mount Elliott Cemetery is the oldest extant cemetery in the city of Detroit, and contains 65 acres (260,000 m^{2}). It is located on Mount Elliott Avenue just north of Lafayette Street. The cemetery is owned and operated by the Mt. Elliott Cemetery Association, who own a group of cemeteries in the Metro Detroit area.

=== History ===
Detroit's Catholic community was originally heavily French in character. However, near the beginning of the 19th century, waves of immigration added other nationalities into the mix, notably Irish Catholics. In time, these Irish Catholics departed from the French-speaking Ste. Anne's and established their own parish. By 1840, they decided they wanted their own cemetery. In 1841, the parish purchased 12 acres (49,000 m^{2}) of farmland from the Leib farm for $400.

The first burial in the cemetery occurred only twelve days after its establishment when Robert Elliott, an architect, judge, and founding member of the committee that created the cemetery, was laid to rest. He had been killed in a construction accident on September 10, 1841. The cemetery was christened "Mount Elliott" in his honor.

A second parcel of land was purchased for the cemetery in 1865, and a third in 1881; this brought the size of the cemetery to its current 65 acres (260,000 m^{2}). In 1869, remains from Detroit's Ste. Anne Cemetery were moved and re-interred at Mount Elliott. Among the remains moved was Colonel Jean François Hamtramck.

=== Description ===
Roads winding through the cemetery carry the names of religious leaders (Pope Pius Avenue, Bishop LeFevere Avenue and Place, and Bishop Borgess Avenue) or biblical themes (Calvary Avenue, Holy Cross Place, Trinity Avenue, and Resurrection Avenue).

The entrance to Mt. Elliott Cemetery is through a stone gateway designed and built by Walter Schweikart in September 1882 at a cost of $6,000. Schweikart also built the entrance to the nearby Elmwood cemetery.

In 1872, Fireman's Fund bought large lots for $500 apiece in both Mt. Elliott and Elmwood Cemeteries for the purpose of burying firefighters. In 1889, the Fund erected a marker at the site for a cost of $2,965.

=== Gravesites ===
The following are some notable people buried in Mt. Elliott:

- Orestes Brownson (1803–1876) Prolific Catholic writer. His remains were later moved to Basilica of the Sacred Heart, Notre Dame University, South Bend, Indiana
- Jerome Cavanagh (1928–1979) Mayor of Detroit
- Marilyn Fisher Lundy (1925–2014), businesswoman and philanthropist.
- Francis Palms (1809–1886), Lumber baron, Rail baron and Real estate tycoon, in family mausoleum

== Elmwood Cemetery ==
Elmwood Cemetery, established in 1846, is 86 acres (350,000 m^{2}) in size and contains over 51,000 graves. It is located on Lafayette Street, just east of Mt. Elliott Avenue. It is the oldest continuously operating, non-denominational cemetery in Michigan.

=== History ===
Elmwood Cemetery was originally planned in 1846. The first 42 acres (170,000 m^{2}) were purchased from the George Hunt farm using money from subscriptions in 1850. Over the years, additional land was purchased from the Hunt Farm and the neighboring D.C. Whitwood farm to increase the grounds to the current 86 acres (350,000 m^{2}).

A Gothic Revival chapel, designed by Albert and Octavius Jordan, was added in 1856. The limestone chapel blends into the natural ravine and landscaping. Gordon W. Lloyd designed the Gothic-inspired gatehouse in 1870.

The 1856 chapel, which had fallen into disuse, was refurbished in the 1950s and is still used today. The chapel was extensively restored after a late 1900s fire.

=== Description ===
Elmwood Cemetery is one of the few places in modern Detroit where the "original" rolling terrain of the area can be seen. Parent Creek (renamed "Bloody Run" after the famous Indian battle) runs through the cemetery, serving as a focus of the landscape. Noted landscape designer Frederick Law Olmsted, inspired by the Mount Auburn Cemetery in Massachusetts, contributed to the redesign of the overall cemetery plan in 1891.

The cemetery is also famous for its multiple monuments, creating a city in miniature. These include works by noted sculptors, including the marble "Veiled Lady" by Randolph Rogers, and "Flying Geese" by Marshall Fredericks.

=== Gravesites ===
Twenty-nine Detroit mayors, at least six governors, eleven senators, and a dozen cabinet members are buried on the grounds. Those interred at Elmwood include:

- Lewis Cass (1782–1866) Territorial governor, Senator, and Secretary of State
- Zachariah Chandler (1813-1879) Detroit mayor, Michigan senator, and U.S. Secretary of the Interior
- Douglass Houghton (1809–1845) Detroit mayor and explorer
- Bernhard Stroh (1822–1882) Founder of the Stroh Brewery
- Martha Jean Steinberg (1930–2000) Radio personality
- Coleman Young (1918–1997) Detroit's first African-American mayor
- Jacob Merritt Howard (1805–1871) U.S. Senator and writer of the 13th amendment
- Margaret Mather (1859–1898) Canadian actress
- Henry Billings Brown (1836-1913) U.S. Supreme Court Associate Justice
- Edwin C. Denby (1879–1929) Secretary of the Navy
- Zina Pitcher (1797–1872) Detroit mayor

== Lafayette Street Cemetery ==
The Lafayette Street Cemetery, established by the Temple Beth El in 1850, is Michigan's oldest Jewish cemetery. It was originally named Champlain Street Cemetery of Temple Beth El because Lafayette was formerly known as Champlain Street. With an area of 0.5 acres (2,000 m^{2}), this cemetery is by far the smallest of the three in the district; it is located at the southeast corner of Elmwood Cemetery, on Layfayette.

=== History ===
The first burial was in 1851, and in 1854 Samuel Marcus, the first rabbi of Beth El, was buried in the cemetery. Although use slowed in the late 1880s, the cemetery was in active use until the 1950s and is now part of the Elmwood Cemetery grounds.

== See also ==
- List of cemeteries in Michigan
