= Maple Grove Cemetery (Mason, Michigan) =

Cemetery in Ingham County, Michigan, US

- U.S. National Register of Historic Places
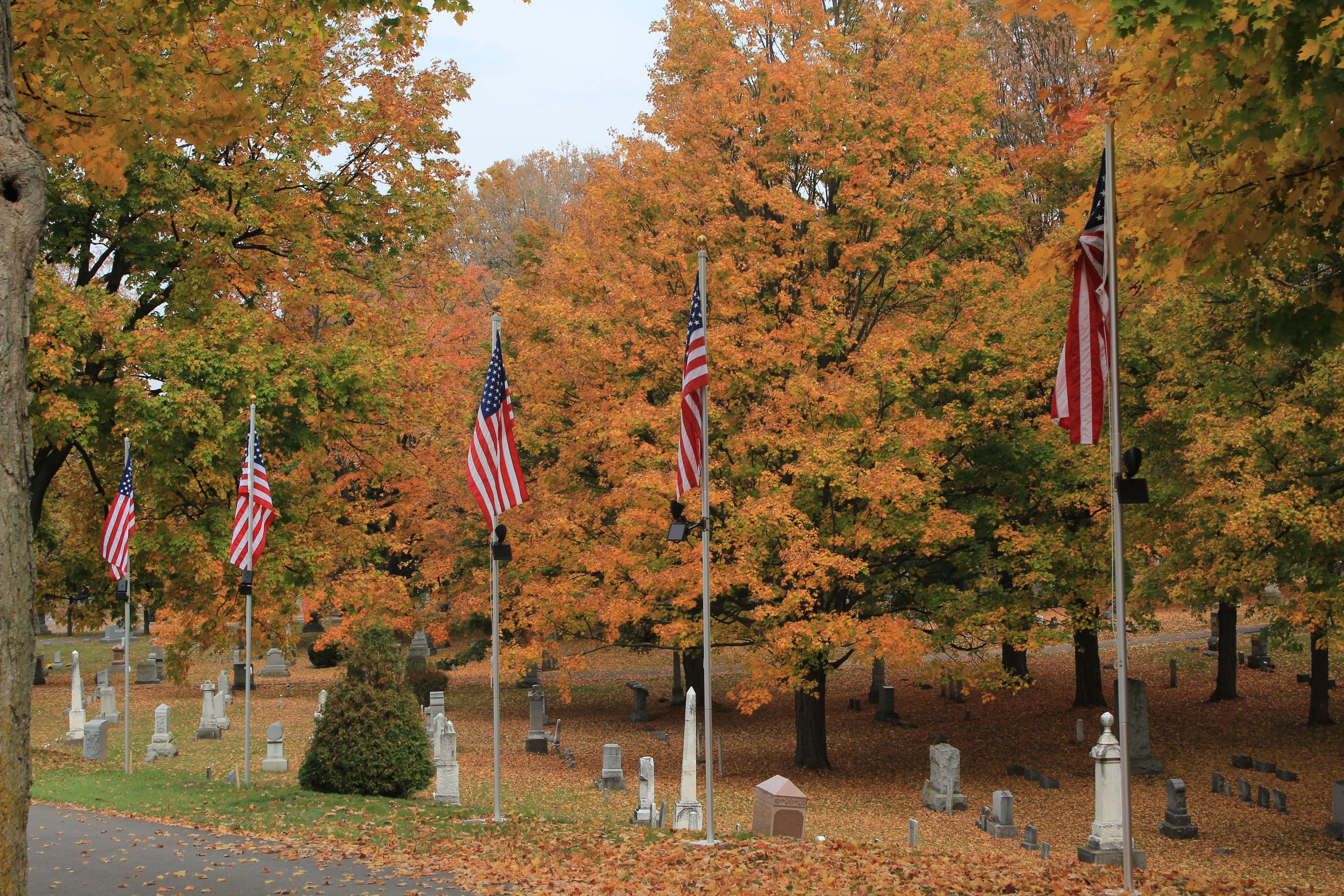
- Interactive map
- Location: W. Columbia St., Mason, Michigan
- Area: 18 acres (7.3 ha)
- Built: 1844
- Architectural style: Romanesque Revival
- MPS: Mason Michigan Historic MRA
- NRHP reference No.: 85001237
- Added to NRHP: June 6, 1985

Maple Grove Cemetery is a cemetery located on West Columbia Street in Mason, Michigan. It was listed on the National Register of Historic Places in 1985.

== History ==
The initial, 1-1/2 acre portion of the Maple Grove Cemetery was leased from Charles Noble of Monroe, Michigan in 1844. An addition was made and formally platted by Isaac B. Woodhouse, a Mason businessman, in 1873. Several additions were made to the cemetery's acreage in the nineteenth century. The name was changed to "Maple Grove Cemetery" in 1897. The main entryway and receiving vault were built in 1890, and the surrounding stone wall was added in 1934.

== Description ==
The Maple Grove Cemetery occupies an area of gently rolling hills, and contains a variety of nineteenth and twentieth-century monuments interspersed among curving paths and tall maple trees. An 1890 Romanesque Revival receiving vault is located near the entrance. It has a steeply pitched gable roof and a three-part facade divided by string courses: checkerboard stone patterns at the top, a section containing the top of the arched door opening in the middle, and the door itself on the lower level. A 1934 stone entrance gate/wall made of large blocks set in a matrix of smaller cobblestones surrounds the entrance.
