= Frederick J. Bancroft =

American physician

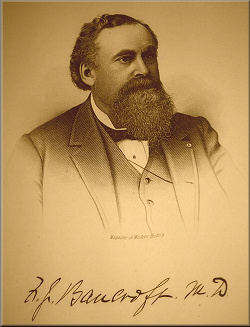
Dr. Frederick J. Bancroft (1834–1903), Denver physician and public health advocate

Frederick J. Bancroft (May 25, 1834 – January 17, 1903) was a surgeon during the American Civil War before he settled in Colorado, where he was considered to be "one of the most prominent physicians", according to a San Francisco Chronicle obituary. In the late 1870s, he and the Denver Medical Association created the public health system for Denver, Colorado to improve the health of its citizens. In 1876, Bancroft was the first president of Colorado's State Board of Health. He became Colorado Medical Society president in 1880. Bancroft was a founder and professor of the University of Denver and Colorado Seminary Medical Department in 1881.

Bancroft advocated for public health measures to prevent the spread of communicable diseases and licensing prostitutes to reduce the prevalence of syphilis. He was concerned about the public health issues due to a lack of sewage systems, regulation of the distance between outhouses and wells, disposal of human and animal refuse in the streets and rivers, and the extent to which animals roamed through Denver city streets. It was not until a major flood in 1878 triggered an epidemic that construction of the city's sewer system began.

Bancroft, who believed in the importance of pasteurized milk, operated a dairy farm in the Bancroft community, which became part of Lakewood in 1969. He wrote about climatology and how certain diseases were affected by climate, which garnered national attention. He was a founder and first president of the State Historical and National History Society of Colorado, now called History Colorado. Colorado's Mount Bancroft is named for him.

== Early years ==
Bancroft was born on May 25, 1834, in Enfield, Connecticut. His mother was a member of the Oliver Wolcott family and his father was a farmer. Bancroft descended from early New England settlers, the earliest arriving in 1660 to East Windsor, Connecticut. His father's family, the Heaths and Bancrofts, were Puritans who settled in Connecticut. His mother descended from the Bissells and Walcotts from the region.

== Education ==
He studied at the Westfield Academy in Massachusetts and Charlotteville Seminary in New York before studying medicine at the University at Buffalo, graduating in February 1861. Bancroft funded his education by himself by teaching school in New York and Connecticut.

After the end of the war, Bancroft attended medical lectures at the University of Pennsylvania until mid-1866 when he moved to Denver.

== Civil War ==
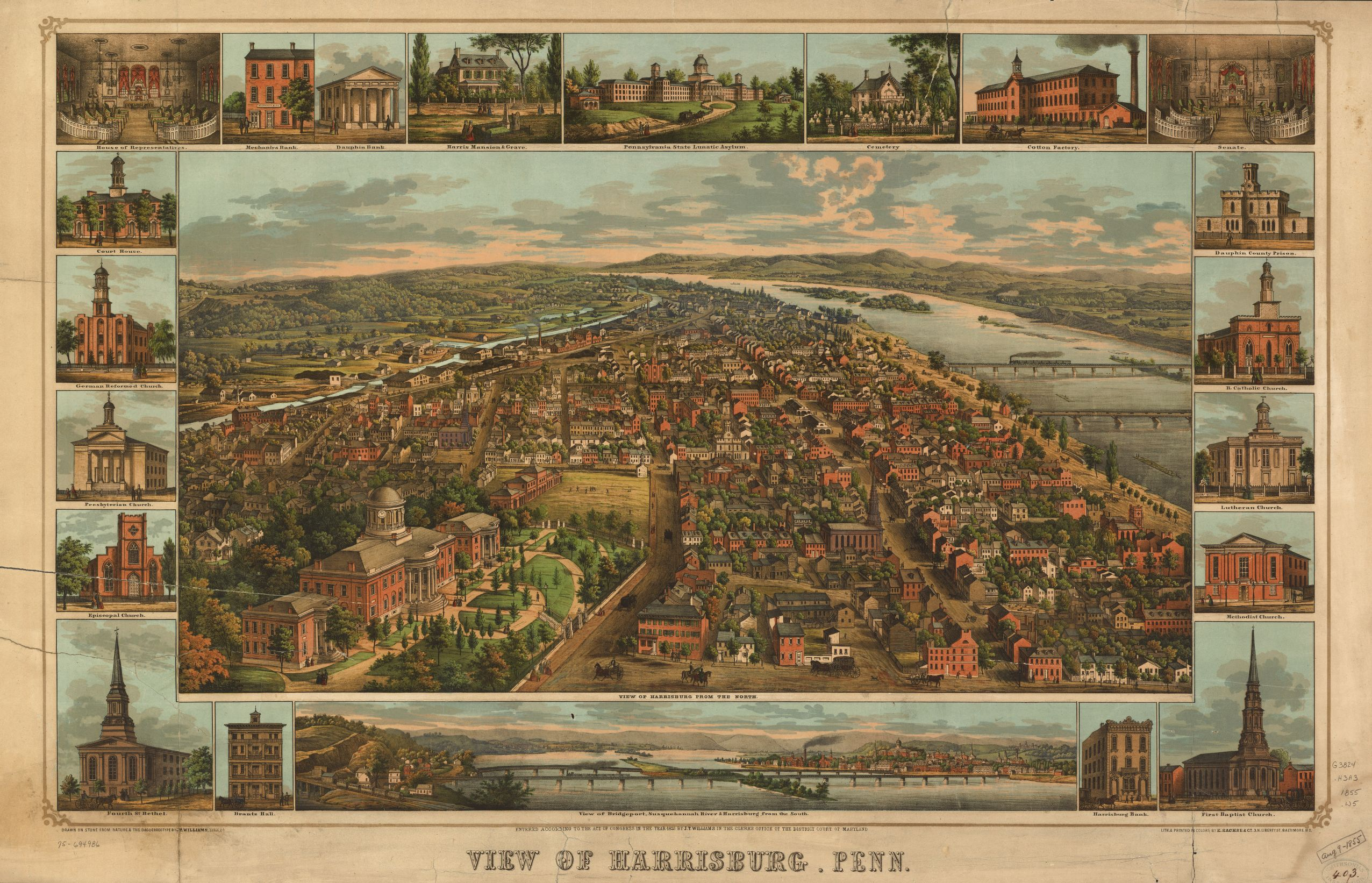
Harrisburg, Pennsylvania map, 1855

Bancroft established a medical practice in Blakely, Pennsylvania (then in Luzerne County) for seven months before he secured an early post for an army military surgeon with the Pennsylvania Volunteers in November 1861. He was a surgeon for the Union Army during the Civil War, serving as officer in charge of Harrisburg's Church Hospital.

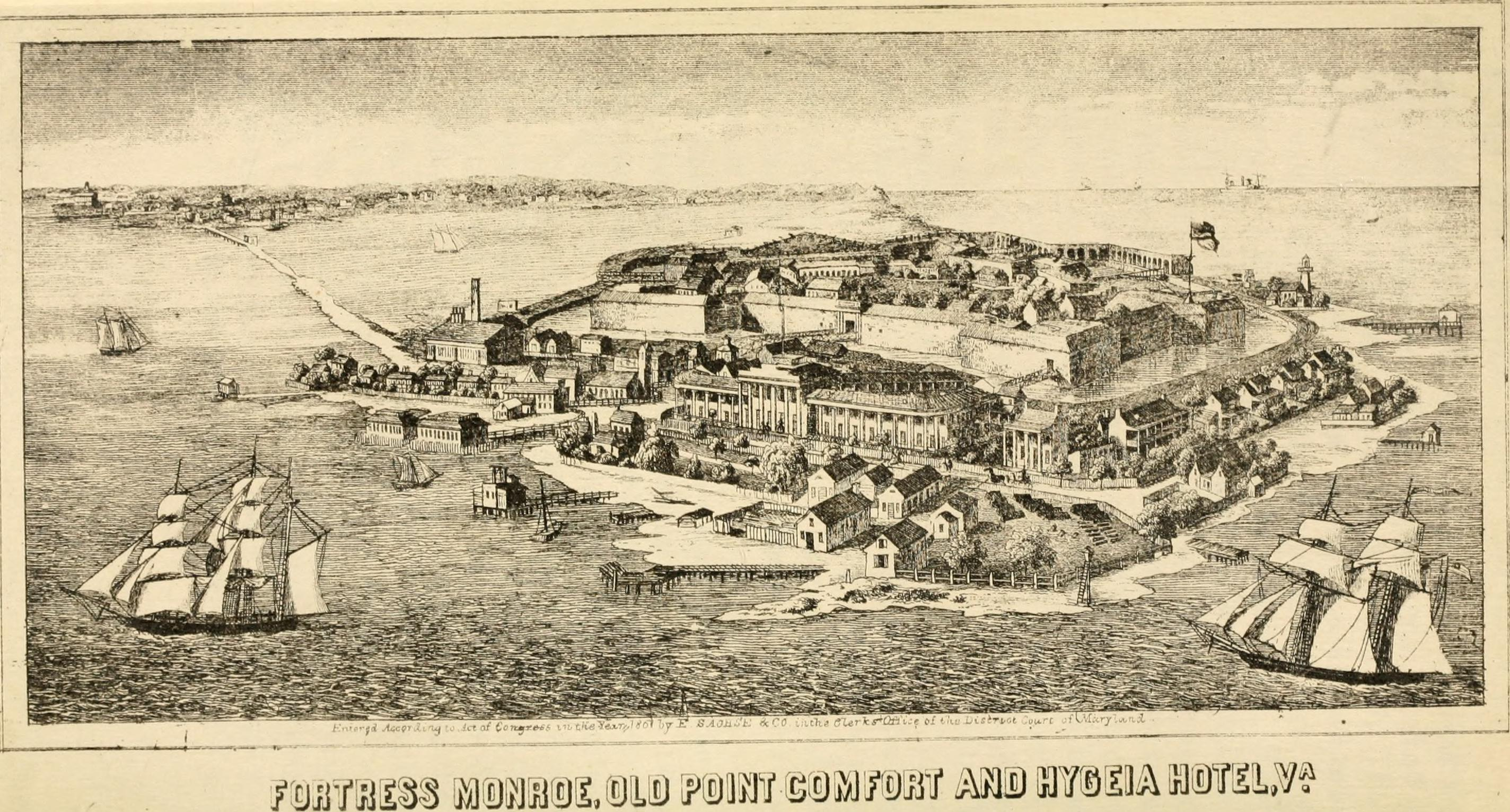
Fortress Monroe, Virginia, from War diary and letters of Stephen Minot Weld, 1861–1865

Bancroft had a number of assignments from the spring of 1862, when the regiments left the camp, until the following year when he outfitted a hospital at Fort Delaware for Confederate prisoners. He became Post Surgeon for Fortress Monroe, Virginia, from June 1863 to December 1865. While there Bancroft was assigned to review operations of all nearby hospitals by the Secretary of War. He treated Jefferson Davis, the former Confederate President who was held prisoner at Fortress Monroe after the end of the Civil war, until Davis learned that Bancroft was from New England and requested a different physician.

== Career ==
=== Private and public practice ===
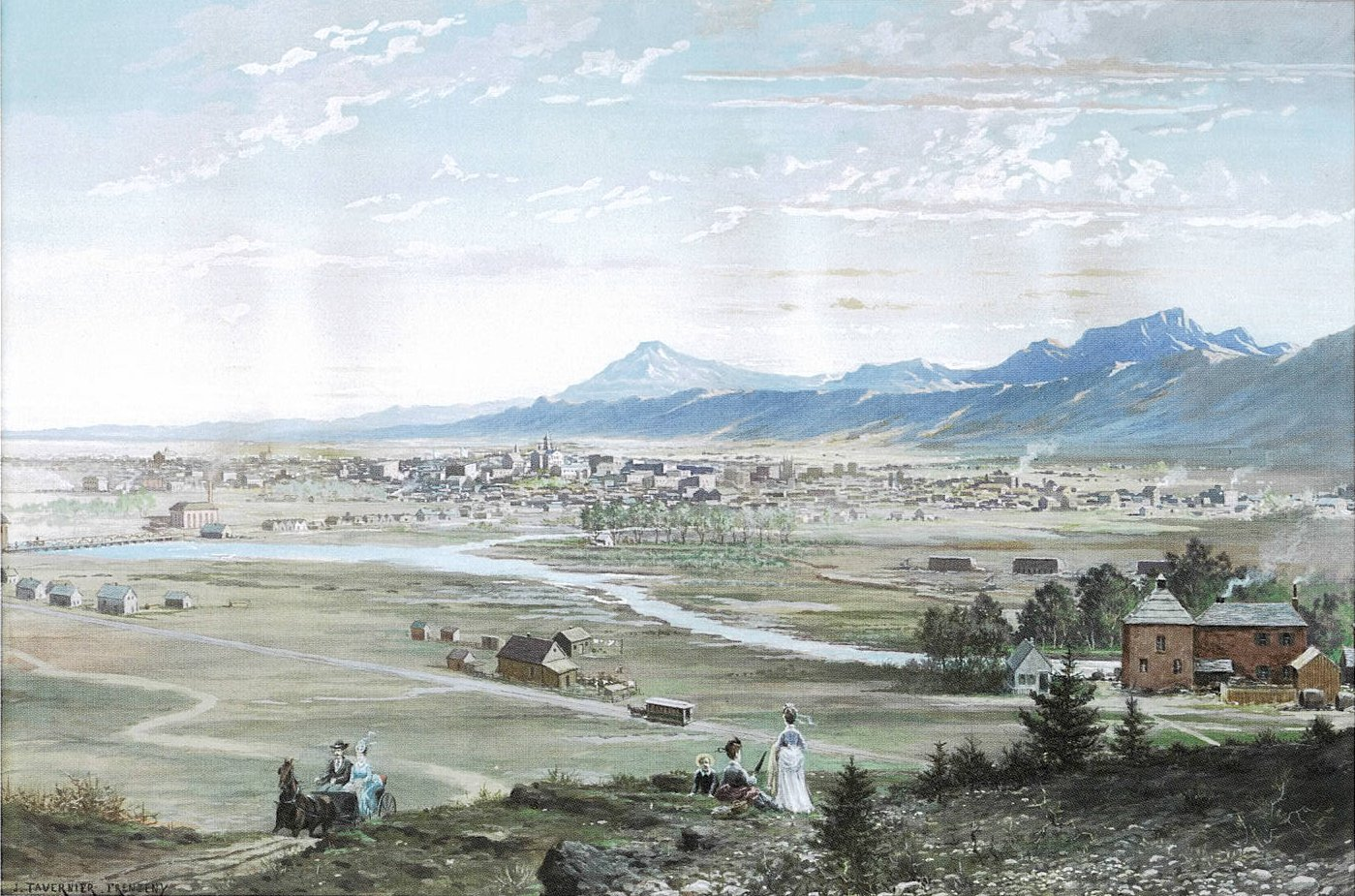
Paul Frenzeny and Jules Tavernier, Denver from the Highlands, 1874

He came to Colorado on June 1, 1866, and set up a medical practice in Denver. At that time, Denver had only been a city for seven years. Bancroft, considered to be "one of the most prominent physicians" in Colorado by the obituary reported by the San Francisco Chronicle, was, for several decades, the "default physician-in-charge" for the city. From 1866 to 1869, he was the Arapahoe County physician. He was a physician in the city of Denver between 1872 and 1878, during which time, the dry climate and a widespread vaccination campaign of Denver citizens significantly reduced the threat of smallpox in the 1870s. Because children were sent to school when they were ill, there was a problem with typhoid fever, whooping cough, and scarlet fever in the 1870s. Bancroft advocated fining parents who sent their sick children to school.

He was one of two physicians on the staff of St. Vincent Hospital, which became Saint Joseph Hospital in 1876. From 1872 to 1876, he was the president of East Denver's Board of Education. Bancroft was one of the founders of St. Luke's Hospital and was on the staff until a few years before he died.

His private practice clients included Denver & Rio Grande Railroad, Kansas Pacific and Denver Pacific Railroads, Union Pacific, Denver and Gulf Railway, and the Wells, Fargo and Company Stage Lines. He became National Association of Railway Surgeons vice president.

=== Public health ===
In the late 1870s, he and the Denver Medical Association created the public health system for Denver, Colorado to improve the health of its citizens.

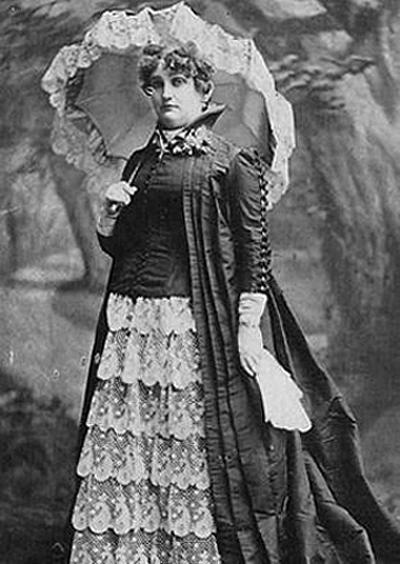
Mattie Silks ran the most successful brothel in Denver from 1877 to 1897

A key public health risk was the spread of syphilis. Bancroft estimated in 1872 that due to the prevalence of prostitution, "probably every third man who reaches the age of twenty-five has acquired ... syphilis" from the brothels in the city. Bancroft, with the Denver Medical Association, advocated licensing, stipulation of allowed services, and testing and examinations of the city's prostitutes. The proposed program was to be managed by physicians and police. The city decided instead to outlaw prostitution and fine prostitutes. In 1875, the Denver Medical Association's physicians decided that management of prostitutes was a solely a police matter. Bancroft continued to advocate a licensing system, as well as making abortion an attempted murder crime. Denver, though, was not ready to relinquish its "sex-drugs-and-gambling lifestyle" from the gold rush days.

In the 1870s, tuberculosis became more prevalent in the city. Bancroft noted in a March 1873 report to the city council that, of tuberculosis deaths that he reported, 75 of 79 were ill before they sought treatment in Colorado. He had also noted in the 1870s that Denver's citizens had injuries or illnesses due to livestock being driven through and penned on the city streets, sewage and other debris on the city streets, and outhouses placed too close to wells. He stated in a couple of annual reports that the contamination is a significant public health issue and could result in a typhus and tuberculosis epidemic, (Note: Bancroft said, the death rate in the city of Denver was low; He reported that in 1876 the annual death rate is the city was 9.35 per thousand, "almost incredibly low". There was also a low morbidity rate for tuberculosis because the outlying, dry state that had not had the factors to make it susceptible to a significant outbreak. But with more people with tuberculosis coming into the state to improve their health and with the contamination issues, the city was at risk for future outbreaks.) he cautioned the city council. Although there were earlier attempts, it was not until 1880 that Denver began construction of a sewer system. (Note: Bancroft met with Denver Medical Association leaders on March 12, 1878 to discuss the city's poor sanitary conditions. He said that even though the city was only 20 years old, it was "one of the dirty cities of the country. Filth has been accumulating for nearly twenty years, with but little disturbance." He found that it was imperative for public health to clean up filth from the streets, which included bodies of dead rats and cats, as well as other human and animal refuge. In addition, the Platte River had been contaminated with waste from slaughterhouses, factories, and butchers. The group — Dr. Charles Denison, Dr. William Whitehead, Dr. Harrison Lemen, Dr. Henry Steele, and Dr. William McClelland — discussed these concerns, as well as the need to address unsanitary wells and gain public support about the health risks to gain influence with the city council. After the issue was addressed with medical association members, they realized that the extent of the issue was underestimated, for instance, there were places where there was open sewage on the streets, which were covered with boards to prevent people from walking through it. The public, however, did not respond to the concerns until a flood on May 22, 1878, flooded Cherry Creek, which was then contaminated with animal remains and other material. An epidemic ensued in 1879. John W. Graham became the city's physicians and soon after ordered the immediate construction of a sewer.)

In 1876, he was elected president of the Denver Medical Association. He was a member of the American Medical Association. Bancroft was elected president of the Colorado State Medical Society in 1880. The following year he helped found the University of Denver and Colorado Seminary Medical Department. His name was linked in the 20th century with Dr. Florence R. Sabin as "creators of the humanitarian healthcare tradition" in Colorado.

=== State Board of Health ===
In 1876, he was the first president of Colorado's State Board of Health, which was then called the Territorial Board of Health. The board was created when Governor John L. Routt signed legislation into law creating the nine-member board to investigate public health issues and recommend resolutions. It had an annual budget of $500,000. (Note: Other physicians from across the state who were members of the board were William H. Williams, A.V. Small, Thomas G. Horn, William Edmondson, Russell J. Collins, Timothy M. Smith, and Thomas N. Metcalf. The secretary was Harrison A. Lemen. He became Colorado Medical Society president in 1880. He was a founder and professor of the University of Denver and Colorado Seminary Medical Department in 1881.) The Colorado State Board of Health was established on March 22, 1877, with Frederick Bancroft as its president. It had limited responsibility, such as gathering statistics about sewage disposal and water supply. Bancroft also advocated for research into what altitudes were best suited for children's development mentally and physically. Because of their limited role in advocated public health issues, members resigned and waited until the end of their terms to leave their posts. There were no members and the board failed to exist on June 1, 1886.

=== Author ===
Bancroft wrote about climatology, specifically how certain diseases were affected by climate, which garnered national attention. He discussed the healthful benefits of recuperating in the state, which is "said to have been responsible for more people moving to Colorado than any other single factor."

=== Other ===
Bancroft, who believed in the importance of pasteurized milk, operated an 800-acre dairy farm about 5 miles southwest of Denver in the Bancroft community, which became part of Lakewood in 1969. Lambert Dairy was located near the intersection of Morrison Road and Harlan Road. The sanitized milk that was produced at Lambert Dairy was supplied to St. Lukes Hospital, where many of his patients were victims of diphtheria and typhoid. Bancroft believed that there was a connection between their illness and the ingestion of unpasteurized milk.

Some of the farm land was donated by his son, George Bancroft, for the construction of a one-room school that was named "Bancroft School". The Bancrofts also donated land in the area for Midway School. Herndon Davis made a painting of the farmhouse in 1941; it is displayed in the Western History section of the Denver Public Library.

Bancroft was a founder and president of Agricultural ditch beginning in 1875. It was an important irrigation canal for the Denver region. After having played a key role in 1868 in the development of Denver's Grand Army post, Bancroft became department commander for Colorado and Wyoming. He was Denver's pension examiner. Bancroft helped to improve the Denver schools and from 1872 to 1876, he was president of East Denver schools. He assisted in the administration of Jarvis Hall, founded by his wife's father, and the Episcopalian girls' school, Wolfe Hall.

== Colorado Historical Society ==
In 1879 he was co-founder and first president of the Colorado Historical Society, originally called the State Historical and National History Society of Colorado. He served as president for 17 years. Bancroft was a member of the American Historical Association and the Sons of the American Revolution.

== Personal life ==
Bancroft married Mary Caroline Jarvis, daughter of George A. Jarvis of Brooklyn, New York, in 1871. In 1869, she came to Denver from Brooklyn, traveling on train and stage coach with Bishop George M. Randall and his wife, to cure her tuberculosis. (George A. Jarvis had read an article in a Connecticut paper about Bancroft's view of the curative qualities of the Colorado climate.) Her granddaughter, Caroline Bancroft, tells that her grandmother was quite ill when she exited the train in Denver and "fell... into the arms" of her future husband. For one year she lived with Bishop Randall and his wife and was then married to Frederick. Mary Caroline, an Episcopalian, was involved in important works within the Denver community and played a leadership role in the St. John in the Wilderness church efforts. She authored the book A Retrospective Sketch of the Fortnightly Club, 1881–1888.

The Bancrofts had four children: Mary McLean (1872–1949), George Jarvis (1873–1945), Anna Chloe (1875–1878), and Frederick Wolcott (1880–1963). Frederick Wolcott Bancroft became a physician. Bancroft's granddaughter, Caroline Bancroft, was a journalist and author of Colorado history.

The family lived on Capitol Hill on Grant Street, "the Avenue of Kings". Their street address was 1775 Grant Street. Bancroft had two working ranches and a summer home on 2,400 acres between Kittredge and Evergreen. In 1923, the buildings were donated to the Evergreen Conference Historic District. Charles Partridge Adams, who visited the ranch, made a painting in 1897 of the house and ranch for the family.

== Death ==
Mary Caroline died in 1899 soon after the marriage of her son George. Frederick died in 1903. A few years after he retired, Bancroft died of heart failure in San Diego, California on January 17, 1903. His remains were buried in Denver, Colorado. The Walsenburg World said of him, "Dr. Bancroft was prominent In his profession and foremost as a citizen, and iad been identified with the best in the city's progress for almost forty years."

== Mount Bancroft ==
Mount Bancroft, a 12,044 feet (3,671 m) peak in Grand and Clear Creek counties, is named for him. Noted for his work in public health and the state's history, the summit was named for the doctor, at the request of his son, George Jarvis Bancroft (1873–1945). The decision by the United States Geological Survey to name the summit Mount Bancroft was made on March 7, 1906.

It is located west of the town of Empire, within a group of summits including Mount Flora, Mount Eva, Parry Peak, James Peak, and Colorado Mines Peak. Below the summit is Lake Caroline, named for his granddaughter, Caroline Bancroft.

== See also ==
- Dr. Josepha Williams Douglas, one of the state's first female doctors and owner and operator of a Denver sanitarium
- Frances Wisebart Jacobs, advocate for tuberculosis healthcare and founder of Denver's Jewish Hospital
