= Mount Bancroft =

Mountain in Colorado, United States

- Location within Colorado

Highest point
- Elevation: 13,250 ft (4,040 m)
- Coordinates: 39°50′30″N 105°42′02″W

Naming
- Etymology: Frederick J. Bancroft

Geography
- Location: Clear Creek and Grand counties, Colorado, U.S.
- Parent range: Front Range
- Topo map(s): USGS 7.5' map Empire, Colorado

Mount Bancroft is a 13,250 feet (4,040 m) peak in Grand and Clear Creek counties. It is located west of the town of Empire, within a group of mountain peaks called the James Group that also includes Mount Flora, Mount Eva, Parry Peak, James Peak, and Colorado Mines Peak.

Mount Bancroft is named for Dr. Frederick J. Bancroft, who is noted for his work in public health and the state's history. The summit was named for the doctor at the request of his son, George Jarvis Bancroft (1873–1945). The decision by the United States Geological Survey to name the summit Mount Bancroft was made on March 7, 1906. Below the summit is Lake Caroline, named for his granddaughter, Caroline Bancroft.

== See also ==
- List of mountain peaks of North America
- List of mountain peaks of the United States
- List of mountain peaks of Colorado
