= Empire, Colorado =

Statutory town in Clear Creek County, Colorado, United States

- statutory town
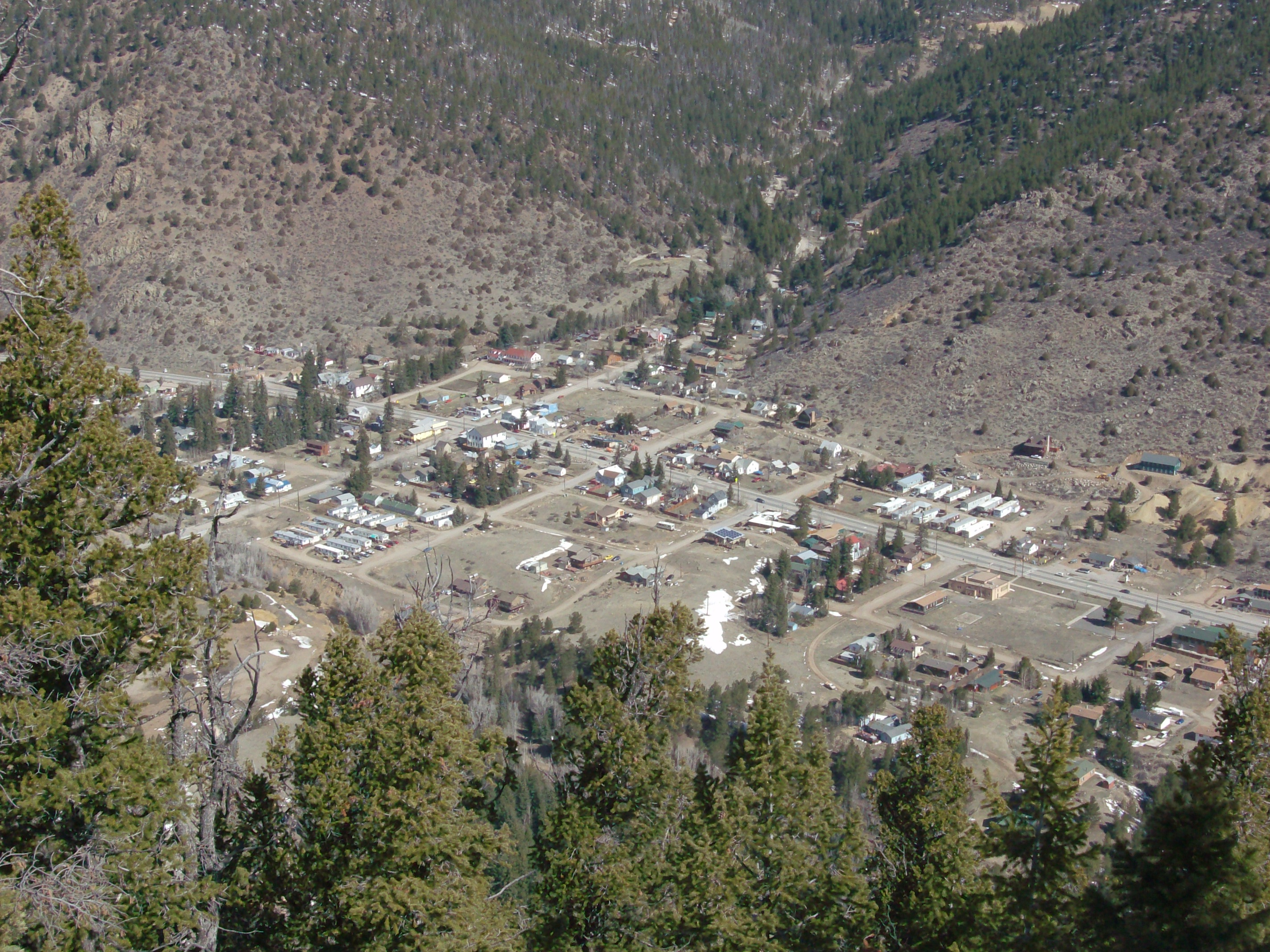
- Empire as seen from Douglas Mountain
- Nickname: Heart of the Rocky Mountain Empire
- Location of the Town of Empire in Clear Creek County, Colorado
- Coordinates: 39°45′34″N 105°40′56″W
- Country: United States
- State: Colorado
- County: Clear Creek
- Incorporated: April 12, 1882

Government
  - Type: statutory town

Area
  - Total: 0.271 sq mi (0.701 km^{2})
  - Land: 0.268 sq mi (0.695 km^{2})
  - Water: 0.0023 sq mi (0.006 km^{2})
- Elevation: 8,577 ft (2,614 m)

Population (2020)
  - Total: 345
  - Density: 1,286/sq mi (497/km^{2})
- Time zone: UTC−07:00 (MST)
  - Summer (DST): UTC−06:00 (MDT)
- ZIP code: 80438
- Area codes: 303/720/983
- GNIS town ID: 2412485
- FIPS code: 08-24620
- Website: townofempire.colorado.gov

The historic Town of Empire is a statutory town located in Clear Creek County, Colorado, United States. The town population was 345 at the 2020 United States census, a +22.34% increase since the 2010 United States census. The town is a former gold mining camp settled during the Pike's Peak Gold Rush that later flourished during the Colorado Silver Boom in the late 19th century. Empire is now a part of the Denver-Aurora-Centennial, CO Metropolitan Statistical Area and the Front Range Urban Corridor.

It is located in the valley of Clear Creek west of Denver, on the north side of the valley. The town consists of several commercial establishments and residents. U.S. Highway 40 passes through the town as its ascends towards Berthoud Pass, putting the town on the direct route between Denver and Middle Park.

== History ==
The Empire City, Colorado Territory, post office opened on June 28, 1861, but the name was shortened to Empire on May 7, 1866. The town was named after the "Empire State" of New York. The Town of Empire was incorporated on April 12, 1882.

== Geography ==
Empire is located in north-central Clear Creek County.

West of the Town of Empire is a group of high summits along the Continental Divide, including Mount Flora, Mount Eva, Parry Peak, James Peak, Colorado Mines Peak, and Mount Bancroft, named for Frederick J. Bancroft who was noted for his public health and historical work for the state.

At the 2020 United States census, the town had a total area of 173 acres (0.701 km^{2}) including 1.5 acres (0.006 km^{2}) of water.

=== Climate ===
This climate type is dominated by the winter season, a long, bitterly cold period with short, clear days, relatively little precipitation mostly in the form of snow, and low humidity.

== Demographics ==
Historical population
Census	Pop.	Note	%±
1890	134		—
1900	276		106.0%
1910	179		−35.1%
1920	105		−41.3%
1930	93		−11.4%
1940	174		87.1%
1950	228		31.0%
1960	110		−51.8%
1970	249		126.4%
1980	423		69.9%
1990	401		−5.2%
2000	355		−11.5%
2010	282		−20.6%
2020	345		22.3%
U.S. Decennial Census

As of the census of 2000, there were 355 people, 163 households, and 88 families residing in the town. The population density was 1,406.0 inhabitants per square mile (542.9/km^{2}). There were 179 housing units at an average density of 708.9 per square mile (273.7/km^{2}). The racial makeup of the town was 94.37% White, 3.10% Native American, 0.28% Asian, 0.28% from other races, and 1.97% from two or more races. Hispanic or Latino of any race were 3.66% of the population.

There were 163 households, out of which 30.7% had children under the age of 18 living with them, 39.3% were married couples living together, 11.7% had a female householder with no husband present, and 46.0% were non-families. 39.3% of all households were made up of individuals, and 6.7% had someone living alone who was 65 years of age or older. The average household size was 2.18 and the average family size was 2.99.

In the town, the population was spread out, with 27.0% under the age of 18, 4.2% from 18 to 24, 30.7% from 25 to 44, 32.1% from 45 to 64, and 5.9% who were 65 years of age or older. The median age was 40 years. For every 100 females, there were 112.6 males. For every 100 females age 18 and over, there were 121.4 males.

The median income for a household in the town was $32,159, and the median income for a family was $43,750. Males had a median income of $40,313 versus $29,500 for females. The per capita income for the town was $20,417. About 10.5% of families and 11.0% of the population were below the poverty line, including 11.4% of those under age 18 and none of those age 65 or over.

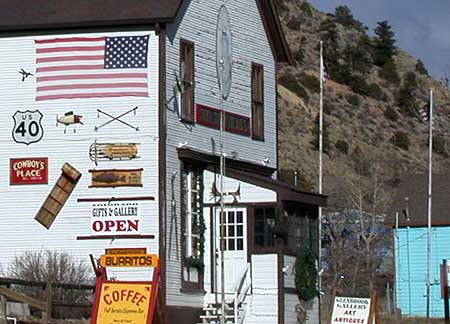
General store along U.S. Highway 40 in Empire, Colorado

== Points of interest ==
- Peck House - Historic hotel and restaurant.
- Hard Rock Cafe - Dating from 1934 and named for the hard rock miners that were its early customers, it predates and is not affiliated with the chain of restaurants that also call themselves the Hard Rock Cafe.

== In fiction ==
Empire is the setting of Bonnie Nadzam's short story, titled "Empire" after the town.

== See also ==
- Front Range Urban Corridor
- Arapaho National Forest
- Colorado Silver Boom
