= Alida Avery =

American physician and suffragist (1833–1908)

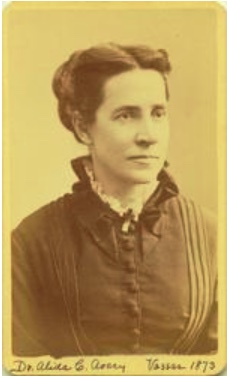
- Alida Avery, 1873
- Born: Alida Cornelia Avery; June 11, 1833; Sherburne, New York
- Died: September 22, 1908 (aged 75); San Jose, California
- Education: New England Female Medical College
- Occupations: Physician, educator

Alida Cornelia Avery (June 11, 1833 – September 22, 1908) was an American physician and Vassar College faculty member. In Colorado, she was thought to be the first woman licensed to practice medicine in the state. She was also the Superintendent of Hygiene for Colorado. Avery was among the first women first admitted to the Denver Medical Society.

She was inducted into the Colorado Women's Hall of Fame in 2020.

== Early life ==
Alida Cornelia Avery was born on June 11, 1833, in Sherburne, New York. Her parents were Hannah (Dixon) Avery and Deacon William Avery. She had two sisters and five brothers. At the age of 16, she began teaching.

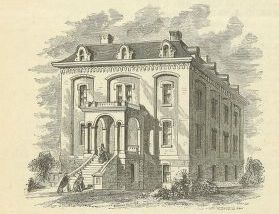
New England Female Medical College in 1860

Women began entering the medical profession in the second half of the 19th century. Some of them attended medical schools founded by and for women. Avery studied medicine for one year in 1858 at the Woman's Medical College of Pennsylvania and graduated from the New England Female Medical College in Boston in 1862.

== Career ==
=== Brooklyn ===
After she graduated, it was difficult for her to establish a private practice, sometimes taking some women five years until the practice was self-supporting. Avery settled in Brooklyn, where she had a "discouraging time" being able to obtain a medical office. Once she found one, she admitted, "I must own to a little dread of the publicity [of being a woman physician] that involves. I am not quite callous to doing things that people sneer at and say hateful words about; but I shall not think of that if I have work." After two months, she found that her patients were primarily her friends that she met before she moved to Brooklyn.

=== Vassar College ===
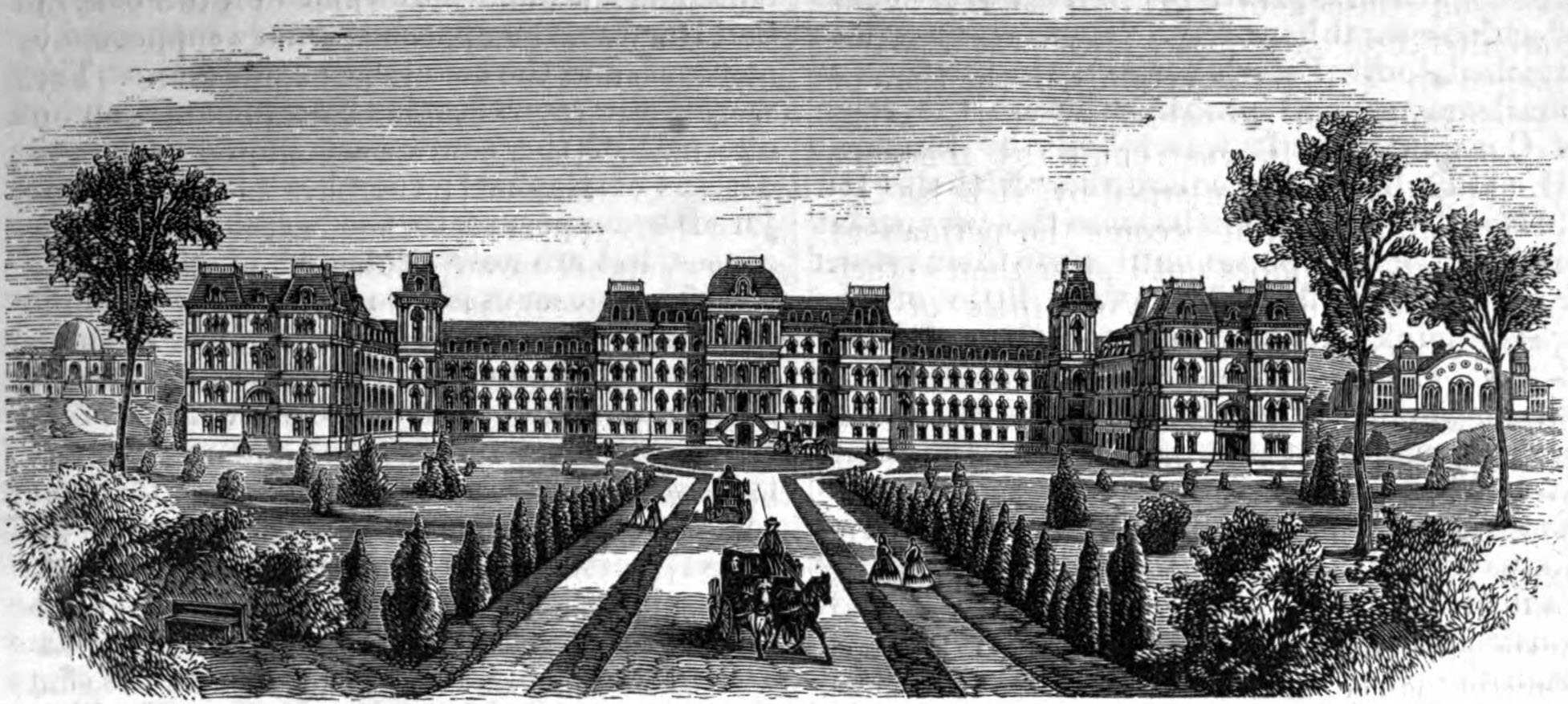
Woodcut print of the campus of Vassar College, 1879

In 1865, she was hired by Vassar College as its resident physician and as the Professor of Physiology and Hygiene. From 1866 until 1874, she was secretary of the faculty. She also organized the school's Floral Society.

Her infirmary was established in a suite of rooms in the Main Building, where she was responsible for the health of her patients and the entire college. Avery believed in hydro-therapy and ensured sanitary conditions for food, water, and milk. She was responsible for decisions regarding control of quarantine, whether staff should be retained or dismissed for health reasons, whether to hold chapel in bad weather, and when to turn on the heat in buildings.

All new students were required to take her course in hygiene. She emphasized the importance of a healthy, balanced diet to become successful intellectually. Many young women with impaired digestion or uncertain health became healthy as a result. Physiology was a required subject in the junior and senior years for the first two decades of Vassar's history. Avery and astronomer Maria Mitchell, the only other woman on the faculty at that time, learned that their salaries were less than that of many younger male professors. They insisted on a salary increase, and got it.

She was seen as a guiding force in Vassar's early years. Frances A. Wood, the head librarian, said: "She came in 1865 as the resident physician, was a strong member of the Faculty, high in the confidence and trust of [President] Raymond and [Lady Principal] Miss Lyman and sharing with them the responsibility of that important formative period. So close were the friendly and confidential relations among these three 'powers that be'—hardly ever one appearing without the other—that some irreverent students dubbed them 'The Trinity.'"

=== Denver ===
Avery moved to Denver in 1874. She began practicing medicine, and was the first woman licensed to practice medicine in Colorado. She was also the Superintendent of Hygiene for Colorado. By 1877, she was making $10,000 (equivalent to $302,344 in 2025) a year. In 1881, she was admitted to the Denver Medical Society, as were Edith Root and Mary Barker Bates. They were the first women to be admitted to the organization. She retired in 1887. After she moved to California, though, she established a medical office in San Francisco and she practiced medicine there for several years.

== Personal life ==
While at Vassar, she had a "beautiful" four-room apartment in the Professor's wing and was known for the garden she established. She was good friends of fellow staff members Maria Mitchell and Hannah Lyman.

In 1876, she was elected vice president of the Women's Suffrage Association. She created the reform strategy in 1877 for Colorado suffragettes to win the right to vote. She proposed the arguments that women were entitled to the right to vote due to their important responsibilities within the home and that having women vote would "contribute to the triumph of rule by reason over rule by violence." In 1885, she spoke about A Plea for Purpose before the Association for the Advancement of Women, of which she was a member. Avery signed a paper, along with Elizabeth Stuart Phelps Ward and other women from the National Council of Women, that expounded upon the negative effects of women's fashion, particularly the corset.

Burn up the corsets! ... No, nor do you save the whalebones, you will never need whalebones again. Make a bonfire of the cruel steels that have lorded it over your thorax and abdomens for so many years and heave a sigh of relief, for your emancipation I assure you, from this moment has begun.

— Elizabeth Stuart Phelps Ward, 1873

She was an active member of the Unitarian Church, women's movement, and the Woman's Christian Temperance Union. Her involvement in these organizations deepened following her retirement. She moved to San Jose, California, in 1887. She lived in San Francisco during the 1906 earthquake, when she lost all of her property. She returned to San Jose, where she died on September 22, 1908.

== Legacy ==
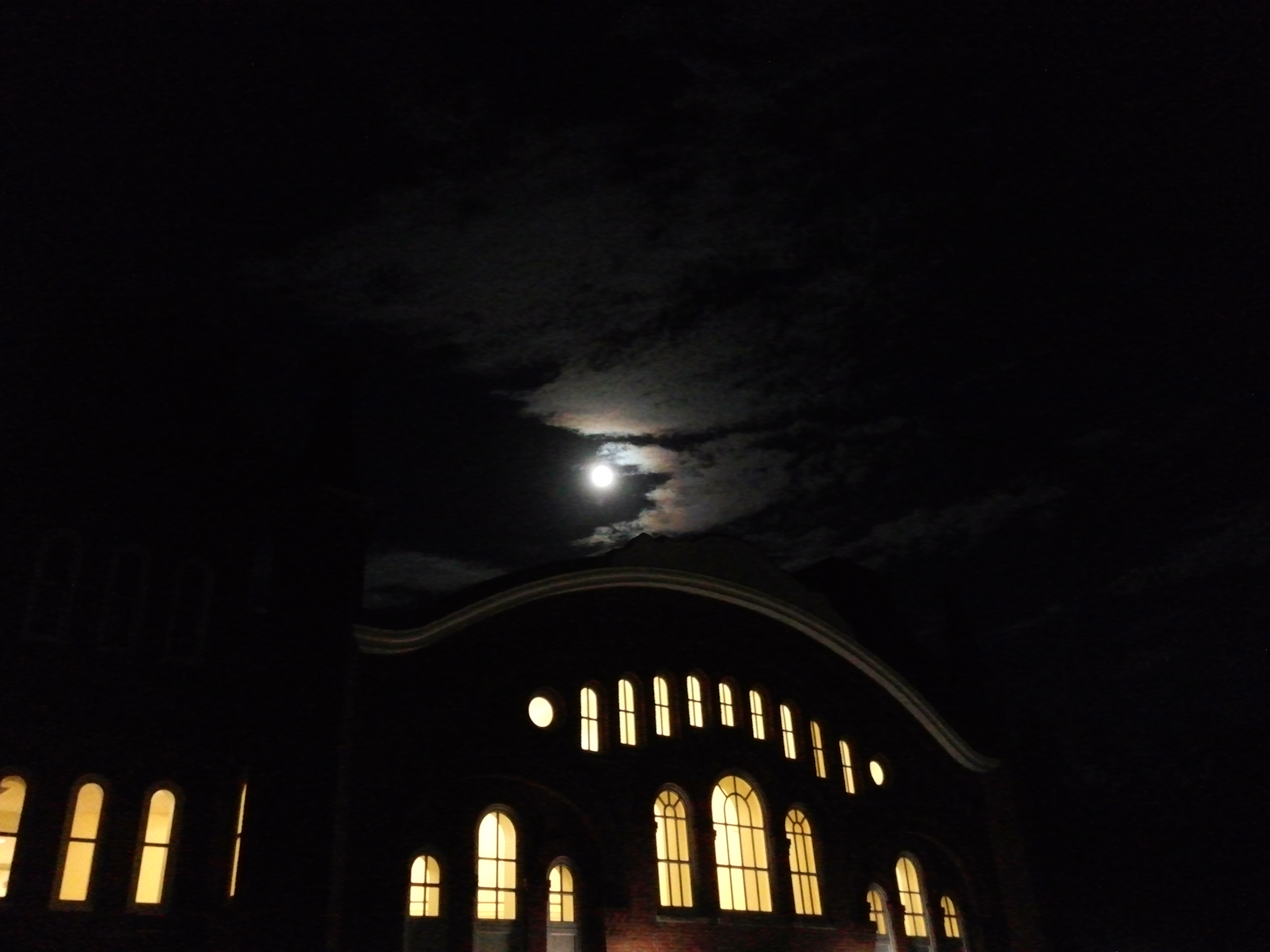
The Avery Hall facade of the Vogelstein Center for Drama and Film at Vassar College in the town of Poughkeepsie, New York. Pictured at night beneath a full moon.

In 1931, Avery Hall at Vassar College was named in honor of her role at the college as the first resident physician and professor of hygiene and physiology. She also was instrumental in the creation of an academic program for drama at the school.

== See also ==
- Justina Ford, the first African-American woman licensed to practice medicine in Colorado
- Susan Anderson, also known as "Doc Susie", was an early Colorado physician in Colorado
