= Mary Barker =

Mary Barker may refer to:

- Mary Cornelia Barker (1879–1963), American educator and labor activist
- Mary Anne Barker (1831–1911), English author
- Mary Ross Barker (1905–2004), Canadian educator
- Mary Jane Barker (1953–1957), American girl who died from starvation, see death of Mary Jane Barker
- Mary Barker Bates (1845–1924), née Barker, American physician and surgeon
