= James Peak Wilderness =

Wilderness Area in Colorado

- IUCN category Ib (wilderness area)
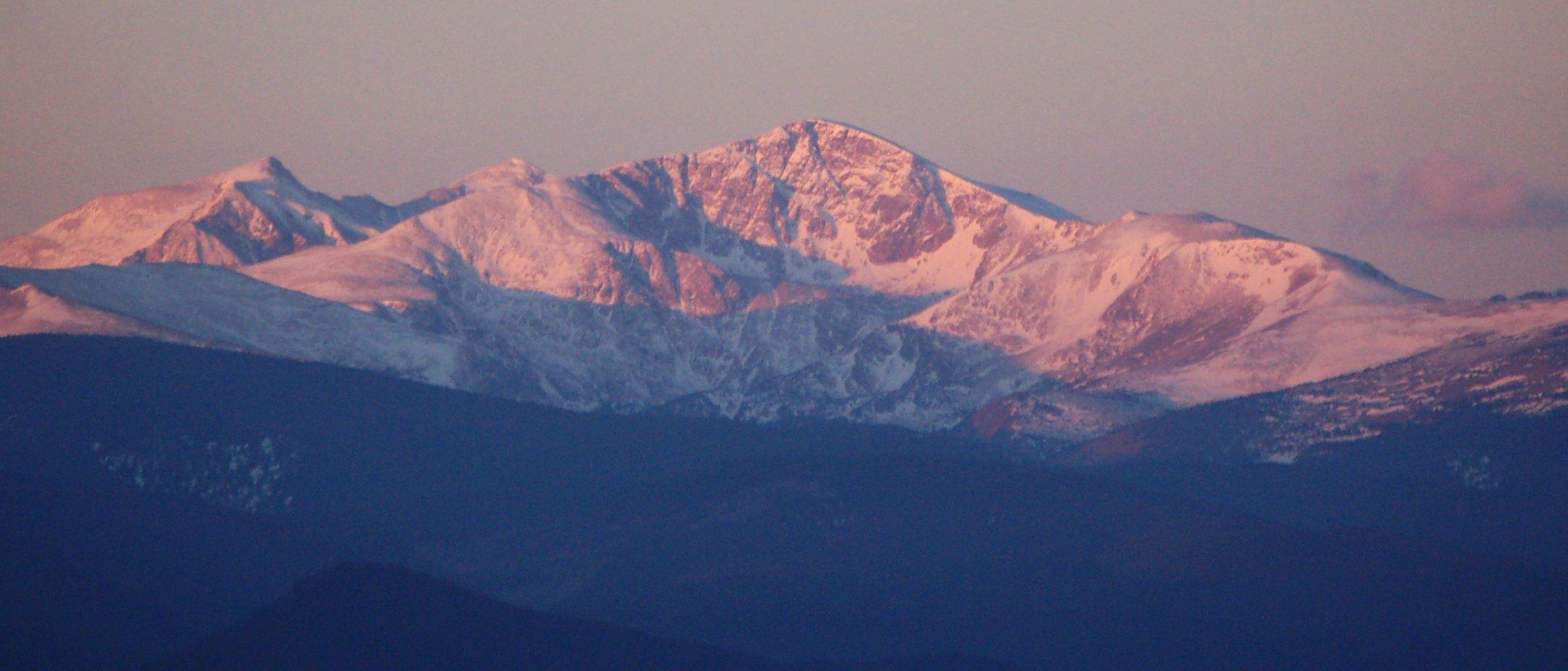
- James Peak in the James Peak Wilderness

- Location within the United States
- Location: Gilpin / Clear Creek counties, Colorado, USA
- Nearest city: Black Hawk, CO
- Coordinates: 39°51′08″N 105°41′24″W
- Area: 17,015 acres (68.86 km^{2})
- Established: 2002
- Governing body: U.S. Forest Service

The James Peak Wilderness is a U.S. Wilderness Area in north central Colorado in the Arapaho and Roosevelt national forests. The wilderness area borders Indian Peaks Wilderness to the north and the James Peak Protection Area to the west.

== Geography ==
The wilderness area encompasses 17,015 acres (69 km^{2}) immediately east of the Continental Divide in Gilpin County and Clear Creek County. The wilderness is named after its second tallest mountain, 13,294-foot (4,052 m) James Peak. Within its boundaries are 30 miles (48 km) of trails. Parry Peak is the highest peak in the James Peak Wilderness, at 13,391 feet (4,082 m).

== History ==
The wilderness was established by H.R.1576 in the 107th Congress (2001). James Peak was named after Edwin James, pioneer and botanist. Originally Pikes Peak was named James Peak prior to Pike's exploration journey. After the renaming to Pikes Peak, the current James Peak was named.
