= Center for Personalized Education for Physicians =

Non-profit organization

The Center for Personalized Education for Physicians (CPEP) is a non-profit organization, headquartered in Denver, Colorado, and it specializes in physician competency assessment and educational intervention. The organization was established in 1990 as a collaborative effort of seven Colorado healthcare organizations: the Colorado Alliance for CME, the Colorado Foundation for Medical Care, the Colorado Hospital Association, the Colorado Medical Society, the Colorado Physician Health Program, the Colorado Society of Osteopathic Medicine and the University of Colorado School of Medicine.

CPEP provides assessment and education for physicians re-entering practice. Its approach is based on the idea that education should be directed by an evaluation of the individual's educational needs and that traditional continuing medical education conferences alone may not be effective in improving practice. This is consistent with the approach of remediation programs both in the United States and internationally. Physicians take part in CPEP programs for medical ethics education and training, to address performance evaluation issues and concerns, and to help them reinstate their medical licenses.

CPEP collaborates with the University of Colorado Schoolof Medicine and is led by faculty and other physician consultants who are board certified in their respective specialties. CPEP is one of five programs nationwide that have been accepted as members of the Coalition for Physician Enhancement, the primary U.S. organization representing programs that provide physician assessment and education.

CPEP receives no funding from medical licensure fees or state sources. Instead, the organization is supported by participant fees and donations from the Colorado medical community, including the COPIC Companies.

Assessment Testing

Doctors are referred to CPEP for competency assessments from different organizations, including hospitals, medical groups and state medical boards. The CPEP approach to physician competency evaluation and assessment has three major components: clinical competence assessment, educational intervention, and post-educational evaluation.

The assessment is individualized based on the physician’s practice and the concerns of the referring organization. The actual assessment includes structured clinical interviews, simulated patient encounters and written testing. This testing is overseen by a board-certified physician who acts as an associate medical director (AMD). This AMD then compiles a final report, and the physician receives recommendations for education based on their needs.

ProBE

The ProBE (Professional/Problem-Based Ethics) Program started in 1992 in New Jersey as collaboration between the New Jersey State Board of Medical Examiners and The Ethics Group, LLC. The program started as a way to provide educational intervention to physicians who were identified by the Board and had received ethical infractions.

By 1996, the ProBE Program had been endorsed by 45 licensing boards and sub-specialty boards throughout the United States. In 2007, CPEP acquired The Ethics Group, LLC, and began offering the program.

The ProBE Program provides education for healthcare professionals, and it focuses on ethics violations and unprofessional conduct secondary to boundary violations in the practice of healthcare. These violations can include financial irregularities, misrepresentation, sexual misconduct, disruptive behavior and substance abuse. The class is offered in Denver, Colorado and Newark, New Jersey in the United States, and Toronto, Ontario, Canada.

Other Programs

CPEP offers a Clinical Practice Reentry Program for physicians who wish to reenter the field after a voluntary absence to enhance a physician's practice, and/or restore a physician's clinical capabilities. This program evaluates the physician’s clinical skills, including structured clinical interviews and a one-day comprehensive evaluation. Physicians are then given a reentry plan, which includes supervised clinical experience to update skills and knowledge and a detailed reporting of progress. To enter this program, physicians must have left the medical field in good standing, and they must want to reenter in the same clinical practice for which they were trained.

The Patient Care Documentation Seminar teaches physicians how to identify basic documentation guidelines, understand the legal issues associated with poor documentation and overcome barriers to good documentation. Physicians can receive up to eight continuing medical education credits and up to two Experience Rating System points for taking the class.

The Personalized Implementation Program is the follow-up class to the Patient Care Documentation Seminar. Physicians submit three sets of charts to CPEP at two, four and six months, and they receive feedback via checklists from a medical consultant on their progress at two and four months. Physicians then contact CPEP for a telephone conference with a medical reviewer and receive a final report of their progress after the last chart is submitted.

== Board and Staff Members ==
- Katherine S. Richardson - Pediatrician, President
- Shawn Dufford - Senior Vice President/Chief Medical Officer
- Elizabeth Korinek - Chief Executive Officer
- Bruce A. Johnson - Attorney, Immediate Past-President
- Greg d'Argonne - Treasurer
- Diana Breyer - Chief Quality Officer
- Richard M. Roman - Gastroenterologist
- Sean Gelsey - Vice President of Claims
- Shauna Gulley - Chief Medical Officer
- Lia Kettering - Executive Director & Hospitalist
- Katie Lozano - Teleradiologist
- Randall Meacham - Exec. Vice Chair, Clinical Affairs & Quality, Dept. Surgery
- Elizabeth S. Grace - Medical Director
