= Mary Barker Bates =

American physician and surgeon

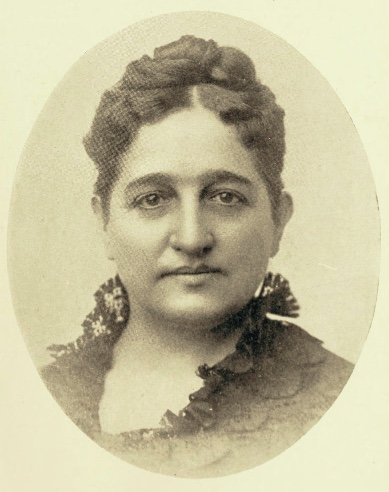
- Mary Barker Bates, Representative Women of Colorado, 1914
- Born: December 17, 1845; Hannibal, New York
- Died: August 3, 1924 (aged 78); Denver, Colorado
- Occupation: Physician
- Spouse: George C. Bates

Mary Barker Bates (1845–1924) was a 19th-century American physician and surgeon, practicing in Salt Lake City and Colorado. She was among the first women first admitted to the Denver Medical Society. She joined the staff of the Women's and Children's Hospital in 1885. She was also a vice president of the Colorado Medical Society. Bates served on the Denver School Board.

== Early life and education ==
Mary Helen Barker, was born December 17, 1845, in Hannibal, Oswego County, New York or Cayuga County, New York. She was the daughter of Dr. Ezra Ferris Barker and Jane Ruth (Freeman) Barker. When she was 14 years of age, she moved to Wisconsin. She was educated in Evanston, Illinois. She graduated from Edmunds College in New York in 1871 and the Woman's Medical College of Pennsylvania in 1873.

== Career ==
She practiced medicine in Salt Lake City as a physician and a surgeon. Her patients included Brigham Young and his family. In 1873, she established an obstetrics school for women. She was a member of the Women's Centennial Executive Committee for Utah.

After marrying George C. Bates, she moved in 1878 to Leadville, Colorado, where she helped to establish the Ladies' Relief Hospital. They moved to Denver for a change in climate to improve his or her health. She practiced medicine in the city. In 1881, she was admitted to the Denver Medical Society, as were Edith Root and Alida Avery. They were the first women to be admitted to the organization. She joined the staff of the Women's and Children's Hospital in 1885. She was one of two physicians selected as a delegate from Colorado to attend the Pan-American Conference in 1896. Bates was elected the 3rd Vice President of the Colorado Medical Society by 1901.

Bates was a member of the Denver School Board. She was also a suffragette, attending and speaking at a national suffrage convention.

== Personal life ==
In 1876, she married George C. Bates, who was also from Cayuga County, New York. He was a lawyer and district attorney. Her husband died in 1886. She died on August 3, 1924, in Denver.
