= Caroline Bancroft House =

- U.S. National Register of Historic Places
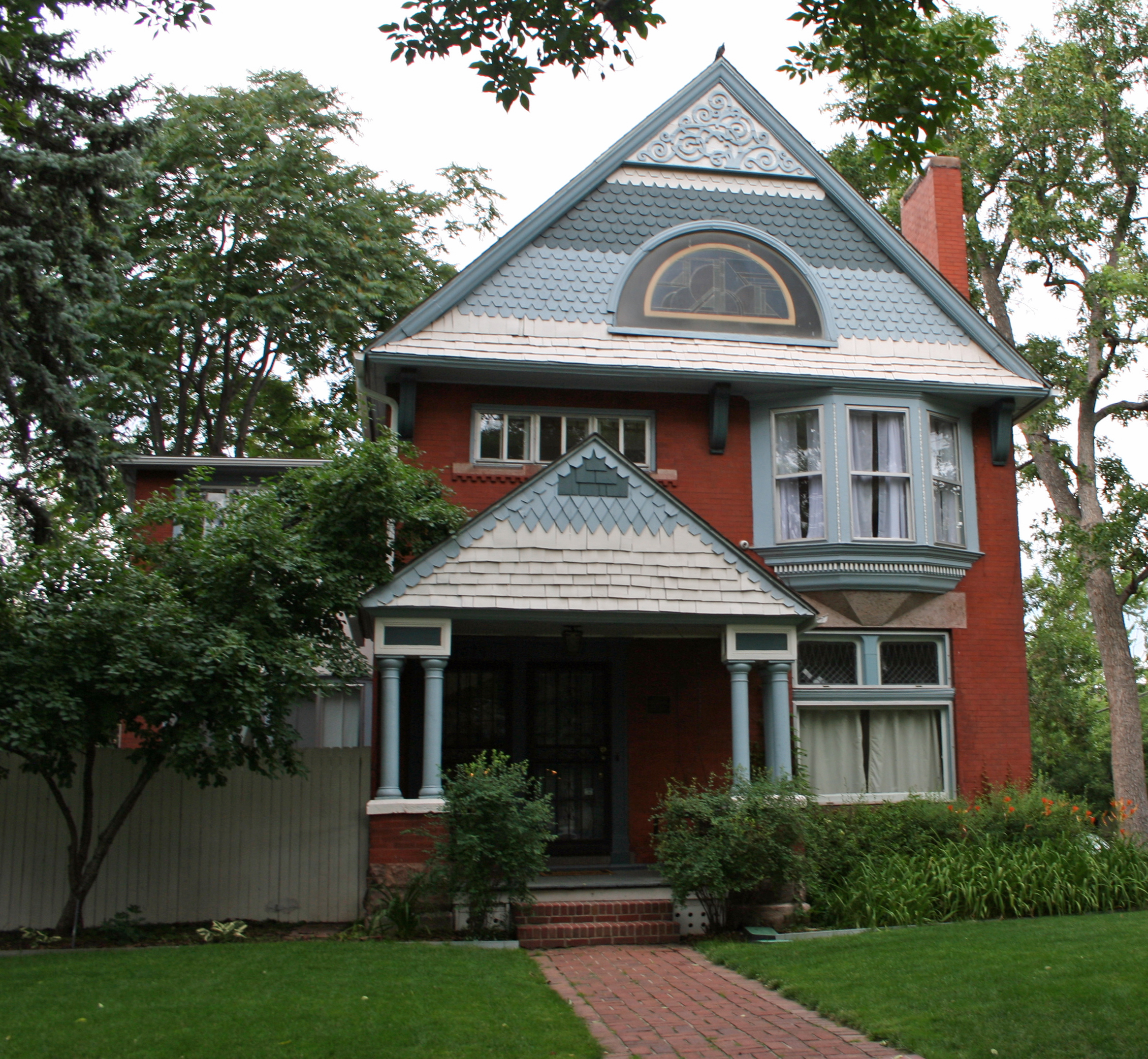

- Location within Colorado Location within the United States
- Interactive map showing the location of Caroline Bancroft House
- Location: 1079-81 Downing St. and 1180 E. 11th, Denver, Colorado
- Coordinates: 39°44′33″N 104°58′22″W
- Area: less than one acre
- Built: 1892; 134 years ago
- Architect: William A. Lang
- Architectural style: Queen Anne
- NRHP reference No.: 90001086
- Added to NRHP: August 29, 1990

The Caroline Bancroft House is a historic house in Denver, Colorado. It was listed on the National Register of Historic Places on August 29, 1990. The house named for Caroline Bancroft, who was born there in 1900 and wrote about Colorado history from 1929 to 1968. She lived in the house until 1975.
