= Caroline Bancroft =

American journalist (1900–1985)

- Born: September 11, 1900; Denver, Colorado, U.S.
- Died: October 5, 1985 (aged 85); Denver, Colorado, U.S.
- Education: Smith College (BA); University of Denver
- Occupation: Journalist
- Parent(s): George Jarvis Bancroft; Ethel Force Norton

Caroline Bancroft (September 11, 1900 – October 5, 1985) was an American journalist. She is known for the books and booklets that she wrote about Colorado's history and its pioneers. In 1990, she was inducted into the Colorado Women's Hall of Fame.

== Early life ==
Bancroft was born in Denver, Colorado, on September 11, 1900, to an established, "upper crust" family and was a third-generation Coloradan. Her parents were Ethel Force Norton, a socialite from Troy, New York, and George Jarvis Bancroft, a Coloradan who graduated in 1895 from Stanford University. He was in the school's first graduating class with future president Herbert Hoover. Dr. Frederick J. Bancroft, her grandfather, was a Colorado pioneer and surgeon. In 1879 he was co-founder and first president of the Colorado Historical Society, originally called the State Historical and National History Society of Colorado. He served as president for 17 years. The 13,000 foot Mount Bancroft is named for him, below which is Lake Caroline, which is named for her.

George's wealth ebbed and flowed as he explored mining enterprises in Mexico and the western United States. Ethel rented out the second floor of their home at 1081 Downing Street to help support her two daughters, Caroline and Peggy, who was born in 1905. For entertainment, Caroline liked to ride horses that the family kept at a Corona Street livery or at the family's 2,500 acre summer home in Bear Creek Canyon. The ranch and summer home, purchased by Frederick Bancroft, were located between Kittredge and Evergreen. In 1923, the buildings were donated to the Evergreen Conference Historic District. She also like to travel to her father's Clover Knoll Farm by Barnum trolley.

== Education ==
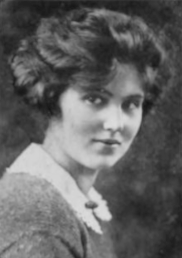
In the Smith College yearbook, 1923

Bancroft received her Bachelor of Arts from Smith College and attended the University of Denver where she attained a master's degree in history. Central City, Colorado, was the subject of her master's thesis.

== Adulthood and career ==
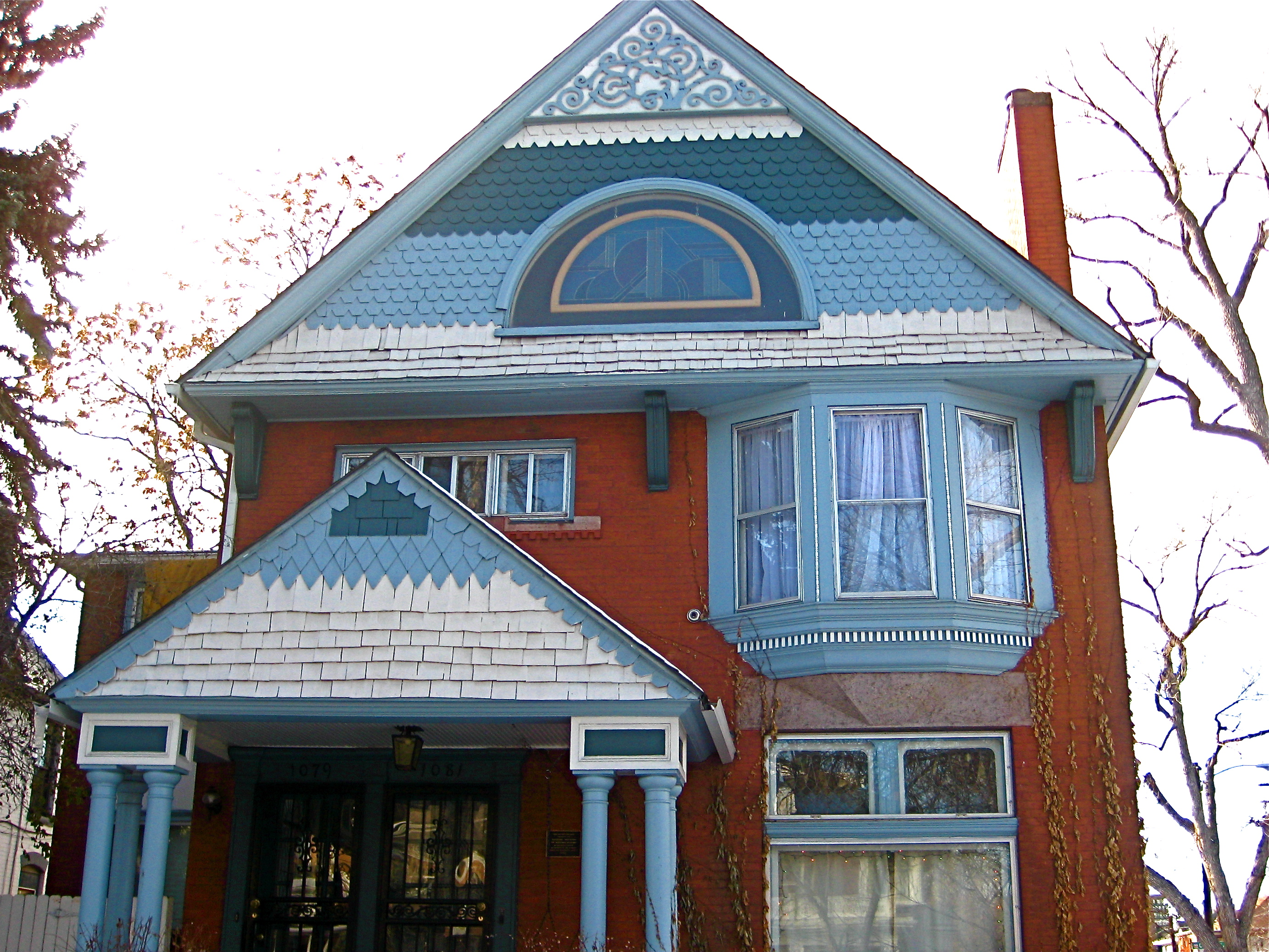
Caroline Bancroft House, 1079-1081 Downing Street, Denver, Colorado is on the National Register of Historic Places.

Standing six feet tall, she often wore paper flowers in braids that wound on the top of her head. She was friendly and witty to many. She called herself a social historian because she enjoyed being around her friends. Bancroft was known to say, "I'm Caroline. It rhymes with sin, gin, and jasmine. Take your pick." Some found her without humor, sour, and forthright, which meant that she also made enemies.

Bancroft worked as a cruise ship teacher and as a journalist for The Denver Post. She published nine booklets on Colorado History that sold nearly a million copies. They captured the "drama and spirit" of Colorado's history, but she may have occasionally taken poetic license in her storytelling. David H. Halaas, a historian for the Colorado Historical Society said "Caroline was—and is—a force in Colorado history." Bancroft was particularly interested in the history of the Tabor family, Leadville, and Central City, Colorado. Daniel K. Peterson was the photographer and map illustrator for her on the booklet on ghost towns.

== Later years ==
Bancroft had tuberculosis three times, had cancer four times, and was blind for one year. Yet she continued to travel. Bancroft died in Denver on October 5, 1985.

== Estate and award endowments ==
In her will, Bancroft left her estate to the Colorado Historical Society and the Western History Department of the Denver Public Library, which awards an annual literary prize in her name "to the author of the best book on Colorado or Western American History". The Denver Public Library's Western History and Genealogy Department makes the annual monetary award, which in 2016 will be a $1,000, and non-monetary honor book awards. Her estate also funds the Caroline Bancroft History Project Award, which is made annually by the Colorado Historical Society, now called History Colorado. It is awarded to "an individual, organization or museum that has contributed to public awareness, interest or involvement in Colorado history, or to its advancement." For example, in 2013 it was awarded to the Chimney Rock Interpretive Association (CRIA) that operates the Chimney Rock National Monument's interpretive program. An oil portrait of Bancroft is in the Denver Public Library, and link to a photograph of her standing in front of the portrait is in the External Links section below.

== Publications ==
- The Brown Palace in Denver. Denver: Bancroft Booklets.
- Glenwood's Early Glamor. Denver: Bancroft Booklets.
- Silver queen, the fabulous story of Baby Doe Tabor. Denver: Golden Press. 1950. LCCN 50004168.
- Historic Central City, its complete story as guide and souvenir. Denver: Bancroft Booklets. 1957 [1951]. LCCN 57037163.
- Photo story of the Matchless Mine and Baby Doe Tabor. Denver: Golden Press. 1953. LCCN 53010689.
- Famous Aspen, its fabulous past--its lively present. Denver: Golden Press. 1954. LCCN 54002920.
- Augusta Tabor: Her Side of the Scandal. Denver: Bancroft Booklets. 1955.
- The Unsinkable Mrs. Brown. Denver: Golden Press. LCCN 57007491.
- Colorful Colorado, its dramatic history. Denver: Sage Books. 1959. LCCN 59006261.
- Denver's lively past, from a wild and woolly camp to Queen City of the Plains. Boulder, Colorado: Johnson Books. 1959. LCCN 59016951.
- Gulch of Gold. Boulder, Colorado: Johnson Books. 2003 [1959]. ISBN 1555662994.
- Colorado's Lost Gold Mines and Buried Treasure. Denver: Bancroft Booklets. 1961.
- Unique ghost towns and mountain spots. Boulder, Colorado: Johnson Books. 1961. LCCN 61065703.
- Six Racy Madams of Colorado. Denver: Bancroft Booklets. 1965.
- Estes Park and Trail Ridge, their dramatic history. Boulder, Colorado: Johnson Books. 1981. ISBN 0933472188.
- Tabor's Matchless Mine and Lusty Leadville. Denver: Bancroft Booklets. 1990.
