= Denver Medical Society =

- Formation: April 1871
- Location: 1850 Williams Street Denver, Colorado 80218
- Chair: Naomi Fieman, MD
- President: Carol Stamm, MD
- Treasurer: Kelly McAleese, MD
- Affiliations: Colorado Medical Society, American Medical Association
- Website: www.denvermedicalsociety.org

The Denver Medical Society is the "Rocky Mountain region's oldest and largest local medical society" It was founded in 1871 to improve public health through education and professional standards. It tackled issues such as epidemics, tuberculosis, and development of sanitation systems, including initiating the construction of the systems sewer system. Between 1889 and 1902, its scope included Arapahoe County. Then, it returned to an organization focused on the city and county of Denver.

== History ==
In April 1871 the Denver Medical Association was founded. (Note: The Denver City Medical Association, made up of physicians who had served the Confederate and Union Armies, was operated between 1864 and 1868 at the corner of Sixteenth and Larimer in a log cabin. No records exist about the association's activities.) The Denver Medical Association created the public health system for Denver, Colorado to improve the health of its citizens. Its goals were to "raise the standard of the profession" and "encourage better medical education".

In 1871 the Dr. Henry King Steele led an initiative to establish a state medical society. The Territorial Medical Society was established on September 19, 1871 when physicians from across the territory attended a meeting in a Denver district courtroom. It became the Colorado State Medical Society in 1876.

A key public health risk was the spread of syphilis. Dr. Frederick J. Bancroft, the Denver city physician, estimated in 1872 that due to the prevalence of prostitution, "probably every third man who reaches the age of twenty-five has acquired . . . syphilis" from the brothels in the city. Bancroft, with the Denver Medical Association, advocated licensing, stipulation of allowed services, and testing and examinations of the city's prostitutes. The proposed program was to be managed by physicians and police. The city decided instead to outlaw prostitution and fine prostitutes. In 1875, the Denver Medical Association's physicians decided that management of prostitutes was a solely a police matter. Bancroft continued to advocate a licensing system, as well as making abortion an attempted murder crime. Denver, though, was not ready to relinquish its "sex-drugs-and-gambling lifestyle" from the gold rush days.

In the 1870s, tuberculosis became more prevalent in the city. Bancroft noted in a March 1873 report to the city council that, of tuberculosis deaths that he reported, 75 of 79 were ill before they sought treatment in Colorado. He had also noted in the 1870s that Denver's citizens had injuries or illnesses due to livestock being driven through and penned on the city streets, sewage and other debris on the city streets, and outhouses placed too close to wells. He stated in a couple of annual reports that the contamination is a significant public health issue and could result in typhus and tuberculosis epidemic, (Note: Bancroft said, the death rate in the city of Denver was low; He reported that in 1876 the annual death rate is the city was 9.35 per thousand, "almost incredibly low". There was also a low morbidity rate for tuberculosis because the outlying, dry state that had not had the factors to make it susceptible to a significant outbreak. But with more people with tuberculosis coming into the state to improve their health and with the contamination issues, the city was at risk for future outbreaks.) he cautioned the city council. Although there were earlier attempts, it was not until 1880 that Denver began construction of a sewer system.

By that point there had been a flood on May 22, 1878 of Cherry Creek, which was then contaminated with animal remains and other material. Then, an epidemic ensued in 1879. John W. Graham, then, became the city's physician and soon after ordered the immediate construction of a sewer. (Note: Bancroft met with Denver Medical Association leaders on March 12, 1878 to discuss the city's poor sanitary conditions. He said that even though the city was only 20 years old, it was "one of the dirty cities of the country. Filth has been accumulating for nearly twenty years, with but little disturbance." He found that it was imperative for public health to clean up filth from the streets, which included bodies of dead rats and cats, as well as other human and animal refuge. In addition, the Platte River had been contaminated with waste from slaughterhouses, factories, and butchers. The group — Dr. Charles Denison, Dr. William Whitehead, Dr. Harrison Lemen, Dr. Henry Steele, and Dr. William McClelland — discussed these concerns, as well as the need to address unsanitary wells and gain public support about the health risks to gain influence with the city council. After the issue was addressed with medical association members, they realized that the extent of the issue was underestimated, for instance, there were places where there was open sewage on the streets, which were covered with boards to prevent people from walking through it. The public, however, did not respond to the concerns until a flood on May 22, 1878 flooded Cherry Creek, which was then contaminated with animal remains and other material. An epidemic ensued in 1879. John W. Graham became the city's physicians and soon after ordered the immediate construction of a sewer.) Due to public health concerns, the association asked the Denver city council to forbid cattle running throughout the city streets in 1879.

The first women members—Drs. Mary Barker Bates, Alisa Avery, and Edith Root—joined in 1881.

== Denver and Arapahoe counties ==
The organization was broadened in scoped when it became the Denver Medical Association and Arapahoe County Medical Society in 1889. Its name was shortened three years later to Denver and Arapahoe Medical Society. It separated from Arapahoe County in November 1902.

== Denver city and county ==
It became the Medical Society of the City and County of Denver in 1902. In 1955, it became the Denver Medical Society.

== Members ==
- Frederick J. Bancroft (1834-1903), Denver physician, public health advocate and historian
- Richard G. Buckingham (1816-1889), Denver physician, public health advocate and mayor
- Justina Ford (1871-1952), first licensed African American female doctor in Denver
