= Colorado Medical Society =

The Colorado Medical Society (CMS) is the largest group of organized physicians in Colorado. This nonprofit organization is composed of physicians, residents and medical students. It was founded in 1871 to promote the art and science of medicine and to improve public health. Projects include a congress for health care reform, a technology fair, and lobbying for legislation to improve the health of the State's citizenry. Recent initiatives and resolutions have created electronic health projects such as COEKG.

== History ==
In 1871 the Dr. Henry King Steele of the Denver Medical Association led an initiative to establish a state medical society. The Territorial Medical Society was established on September 19, 1871, when physicians from across the territory attended a meeting in a Denver district courtroom. It became the Colorado State Medical Society in 1876.
