= James Peak =

Mountain in the U.S. state of Colorado

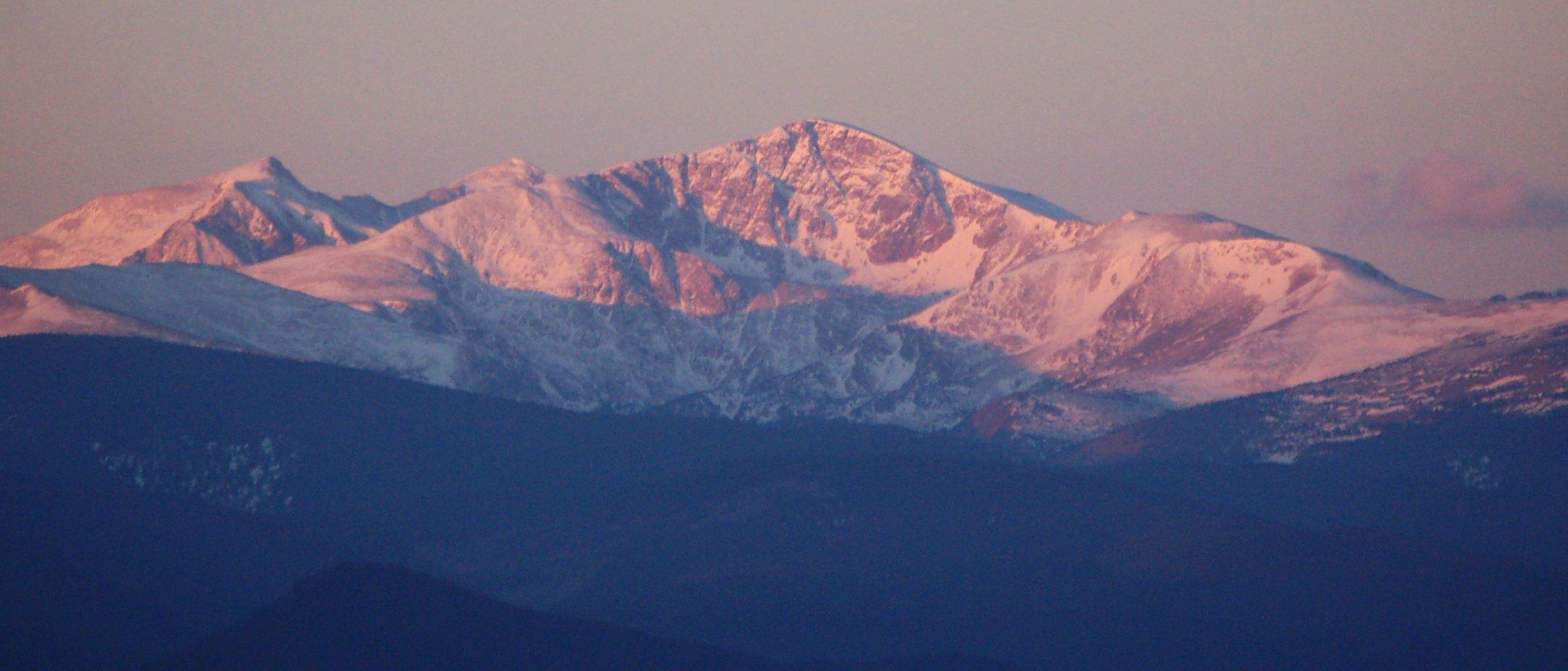
- James Peak at dawn viewed from Green Mountain in Boulder County

Highest point
- Elevation: 13,271 ft (4,045 m)
- Prominence: 714 ft (218 m)
- Isolation: 1.55 mi (2.49 km)
- Listing: Colorado county high points 27th
- Coordinates: 39°51′08″N 105°41′24″W

Naming
- Etymology: Edwin James

Geography
- Location within Colorado
- Location: Continental Divide at the tripoint of Clear Creek, Gilpin, and Grand counties, Colorado, United States. High point of Gilpin County.
- Parent range: Front Range
- Topo map(s): USGS 7.5' topographic map Empire, Colorado

James Peak is a high mountain summit in the Front Range of the Rocky Mountains of North America. The 13,271 foot thirteener is located on the Continental Divide in the James Peak Wilderness of Arapaho National Forest and Roosevelt National Forest, 5.2 miles (8.4 km) east-southeast (bearing 110°) of the Town of Winter Park, Colorado, United States. The summit is the tripoint of Clear Creek, Gilpin, and Grand counties. The peak is the highest point in Gilpin County and the second-highest in the James Peak Wilderness.

James Peak is named after Edwin James, the botanist on Major Stephen H. Long's expedition of 1820. James is the first known person to successfully climb Pikes Peak.

James Peak has a broad south slope that is very popular with hikers. The steep, sheer walls of the east face offer multiple technical couloirs for snow climbers, skiers, and snowboarders. From south to north, these routes are named 'Bailout', 'Starlight', 'Sky Pilot', 'Shooting Star', and 'Superstar'.

== Climate ==
Climate data for James Peak 39.8515 N, 105.6907 W, Elevation: 12,890 ft (3,930 m) (1991–2020 normals)
Month	Jan	Feb	Mar	Apr	May	Jun	Jul	Aug	Sep	Oct	Nov	Dec	Year
Mean daily maximum °F (°C)	21.0 (−6.1)	19.9 (−6.7)	26.4 (−3.1)	32.4 (0.2)	41.2 (5.1)	51.9 (11.1)	58.2 (14.6)	55.9 (13.3)	49.6 (9.8)	38.1 (3.4)	27.7 (−2.4)	21.2 (−6.0)	37.0 (2.8)
Daily mean °F (°C)	10.7 (−11.8)	9.7 (−12.4)	15.4 (−9.2)	20.8 (−6.2)	29.7 (−1.3)	40.1 (4.5)	46.5 (8.1)	44.7 (7.1)	38.2 (3.4)	27.5 (−2.5)	17.9 (−7.8)	11.2 (−11.6)	26.0 (−3.3)
Mean daily minimum °F (°C)	0.5 (−17.5)	−0.4 (−18.0)	4.5 (−15.3)	9.3 (−12.6)	18.3 (−7.6)	28.2 (−2.1)	34.8 (1.6)	33.4 (0.8)	26.8 (−2.9)	16.9 (−8.4)	8.2 (−13.2)	1.3 (−17.1)	15.2 (−9.4)
Average precipitation inches (mm)	3.73 (95)	3.67 (93)	4.11 (104)	5.14 (131)	3.83 (97)	1.81 (46)	2.78 (71)	2.69 (68)	2.39 (61)	2.76 (70)	3.23 (82)	3.34 (85)	39.48 (1,003)
Source: PRISM Climate Group

== See also ==
- List of mountain peaks of Colorado
  - List of Colorado county high points
