= Parry Peak =

Mountain in Colorado, United States

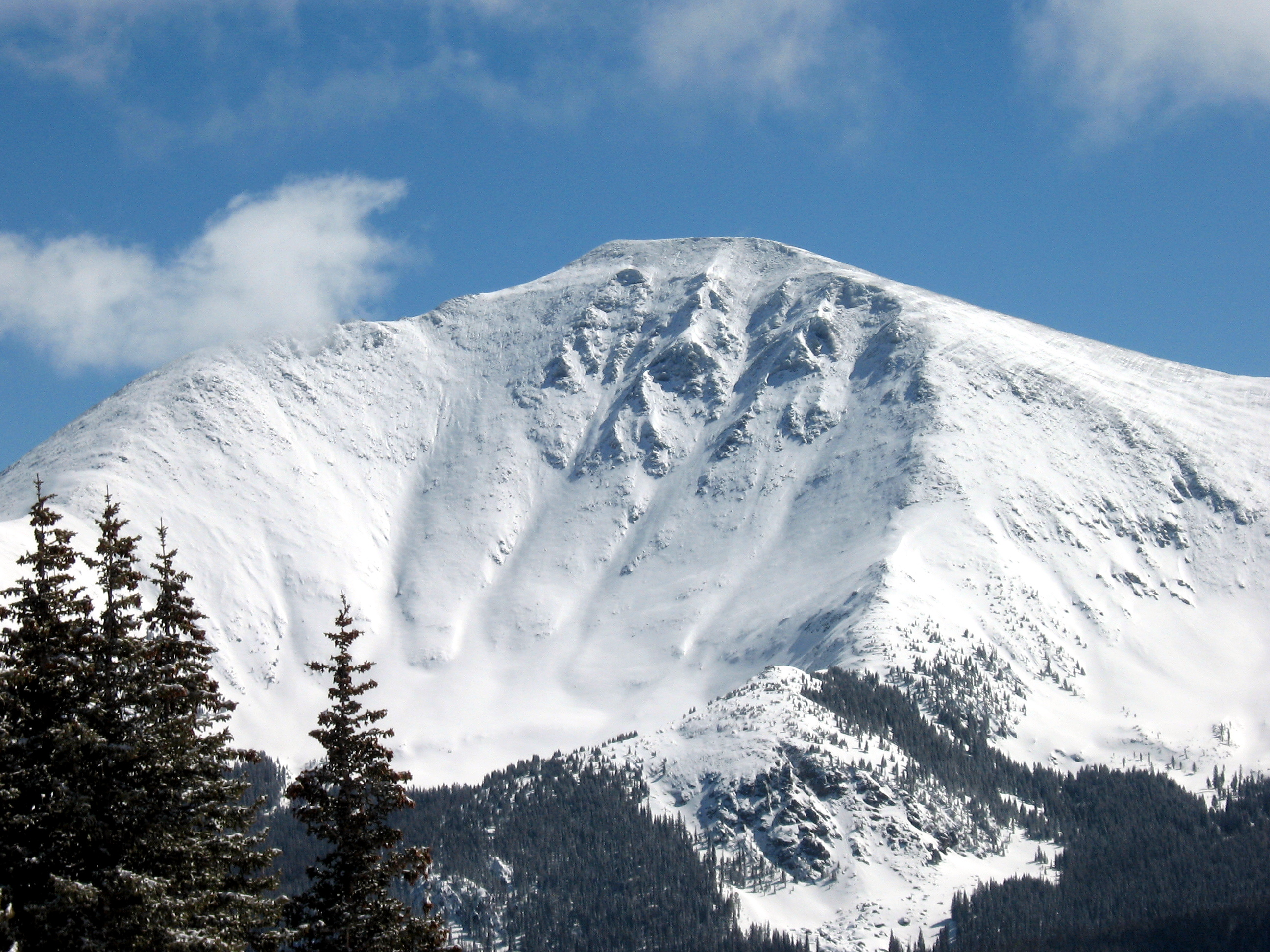
- View of Parry Peak from Mary Jane Mountain

Highest point
- Elevation: 13,397 ft (4,083 m)
- Prominence: 1,720 ft (524 m)
- Isolation: 9.46 mi (15.22 km)
- Listing: North America highest peaks 98th; US highest major peaks 81st; Colorado highest major peaks 41st
- Coordinates: 39°50′17″N 105°42′48″W

Naming
- Etymology: Charles Christopher Parry

Geography
- Location within Colorado
- Location: Clear Creek and Grand counties, Colorado, U.S.
- Parent range: Front Range
- Topo map(s): USGS 7.5' map Empire, Colorado

Parry Peak, elevation 13,397 ft (4,083 m), is a summit in the Front Range of central Colorado. The peak, often referred to as "Bear Claw", is on the continental divide southeast of Winter Park in the Arapaho National Forest. The name honors Charles Christopher Parry, a botanist who made extensive studies of the Colorado mountain flora in the 1860s. It is one of the 637 thirteeners (peaks over 13,000 ft elevation) in the state of Colorado and lies along the Continental Divide Trail.

Parry Peak is also the highest peak of the James Group of the Front Range of Colorado.

== See also ==
- List of mountain peaks of North America
  - List of mountain peaks of the United States
    - List of mountain peaks of Colorado
