= 1st Michigan Legislature =

Legislature in Michigan, USA (1835–1836)

←	6th Michigan Territorial Council	2nd Michigan Legislature	→
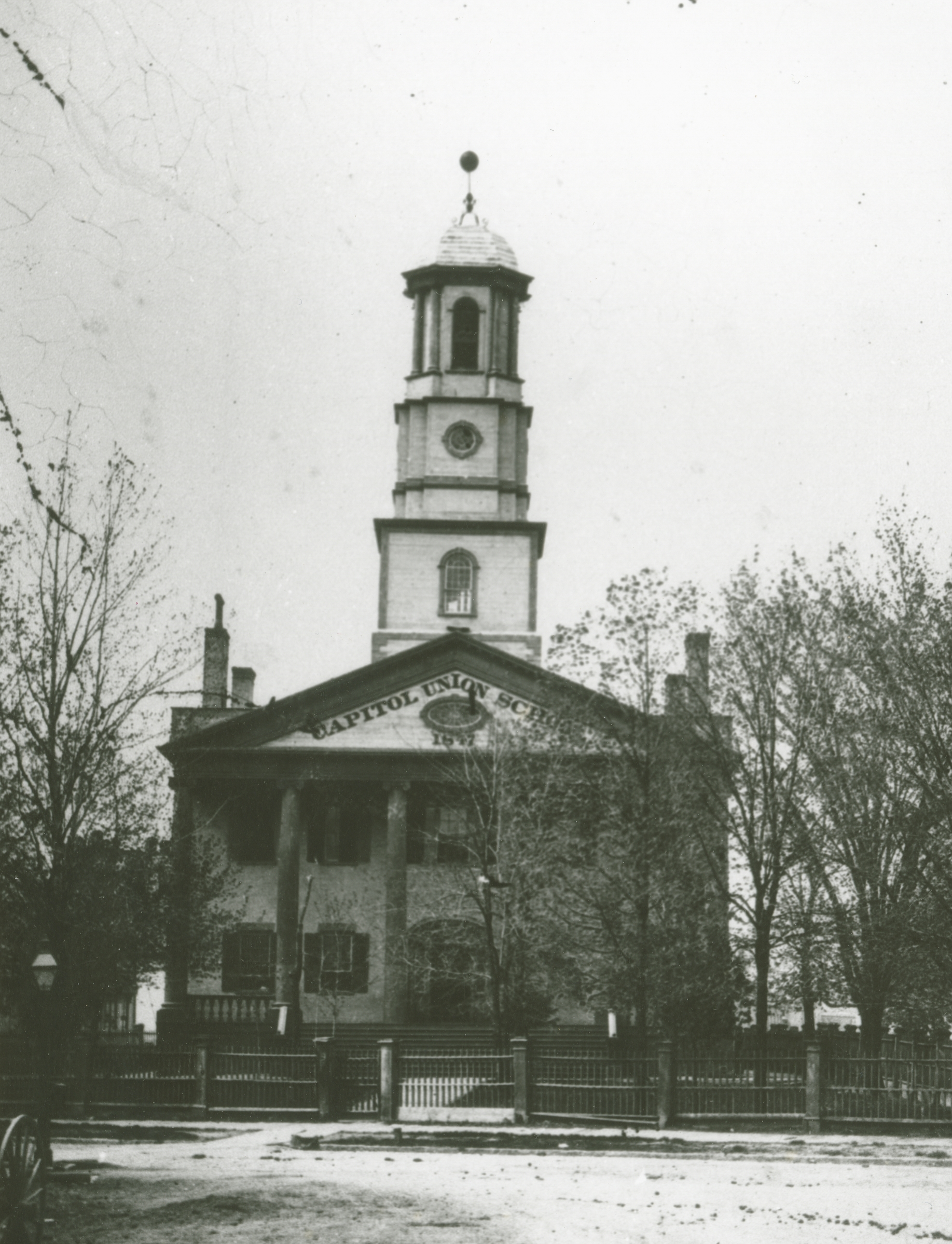
- The State Capitol in Detroit, which later housed a school

Overview
- Legislative body: Michigan Legislature
- Jurisdiction: Michigan, United States
- Meeting place: Michigan State Capitol, Detroit
- Term: November 2, 1835 – January 2, 1837
- Website: www.legislature.mi.gov

Michigan Senate
- Members: 16 Senators
- President: Edward Mundy
- President pro tempore: John S. Barry

Michigan House of Representatives
- Members: 50 Representatives
- Speaker: Ezra Convis

Sessions
- 1st: November 2, 1835 – November 14, 1835
- 2nd: February 1, 1836 – March 28, 1836
- 3rd: July 11, 1836 – July 26, 1836

The 1st Michigan Legislature, consisting of the Michigan Senate and the Michigan House of Representatives, met in Detroit in three sessions between November 2, 1835, and July 26, 1836, during the first year of Stevens T. Mason's governorship of the (prospective) state.

The legislature met with the expectation that Michigan would be granted statehood during this time, but this was delayed until January 1837. During the first part of the 1st Legislature's term, there were two parallel governments in the portion of Michigan Territory that was covered by the newly drafted state constitution.

== Background ==
The people of the Territory of Michigan voted on October 1, 1832, to seek admission to the United States. A census in 1834 verified that the territory had 87,273 white inhabitants, well above the requirement for statehood of 60,000 defined by the Northwest Ordinance. In previous such instances, the U.S. Congress normally passed an enabling act calling on the residents of a prospective state to draft a constitution. But Michigan was embroiled in a territorial dispute with Ohio that Congress had not been able to resolve, and no such act was passed, so Michigan moved forward without one.

Another election was held on April 4, 1835, to elect delegates to a convention to draft a constitution. The convention began meeting in Detroit that May, and voters approved the new constitution in a statewide election held on October 5, 1835.

=== Opposition to statehood in Congress ===
In Congress, opposition to Michigan's application for statehood centered around several objections, two of which Congress resolved for itself. One was that Congress had never passed an enabling act for Michigan as it had with previous states; this objection was overcome on the basis that the U.S. Constitution did not require such an act, which had simply been the conventional approach for Congress to use. Another was that the new state constitution allowed aliens to vote, which led to concerns that this was tantamount to conferring U.S. citizenship; this objection was also overcome, since states were allowed to set their own qualifications for voting, even for federal elections, and this was separate from the notion of citizenship.

The Toledo War, the dispute over a ten-mile-wide strip of land along the Michigan–Ohio border, continued to occupy both Congress and the Legislature throughout the term of the 1st Legislature. Some southern senators also employed delaying tactics in order to ensure that Arkansas's application for statehood would be ready in time for it to be admitted simultaneously with Michigan, preserving the tradition of admitting free states and slave states in pairs in order to maintain the balance of the U.S. Senate. A bill formally offering Michigan and Arkansas admission to the union was not passed and signed into law until late in the legislature's term, on June 15, 1836.

== Election and parallel governments ==
Voters elected a governor, a lieutenant governor, a U.S. congressman, and members of the state legislature in the same October 5, 1835, election which asked them to approve the new constitution; all of these elections were contingent on the constitution itself being approved, which it was. Most of the elected officials were Democrats, as the Whigs generally either didn't want to pursue statehood or thought the constitution itself was a sham since Congress had not passed an enabling act; the Whigs did not nominate a candidate for governor.

The newly elected government was not officially recognized by the federal government, which still maintained a separate territorial government. President Andrew Jackson had installed John S. Horner as acting governor on September 15, 1835, after removing Mason from the position. The existence of the two parallel governments, one under Horner and one under Mason, continued for several months, until the federal government gave up since the people of Michigan clearly thought of the new government under Mason as their legitimate representatives. Having been mostly ignored in Michigan, Horner left to become secretary of the Wisconsin Territory when Congress organized a territorial government there on April 20, 1836, and no replacement was appointed.

== Sessions ==
The constitution made Detroit the state capital until 1847, when the legislature was due to choose a new location; at that time they moved the capital to Lansing. The 1st Legislature met in Detroit in three sessions. Much of the business before the legislature in these sessions involved Michigan's pending application for statehood.

The first session ran from November 2, 1835, to November 14, 1835. Along with certifying the election of Governor Mason and Lieutenant Governor Mundy and performing other organizational tasks, the legislature elected Michigan's first two U.S. senators. Each chamber nominated two people; Lucius Lyon was nominated by both chambers for one position, while John Norvell was nominated by the House and John Biddle by the Senate for the other. Norvell won a joint vote, 35 to 28, and so was elected alongside Lyon. The legislature adjourned with the expectation that statehood would be quickly forthcoming. Since Michigan was not yet a state, the U.S. Senate admitted Lyon and Norvell to its chamber as "spectators" at the urging of Thomas Hart Benton and over the opposition of Henry Clay.

The second session, held despite the continued delay in statehood, ran from February 1, 1836, to March 28, 1836. The legislature elected Henry Howard as the state's first treasurer, in place of Levi Cook, who had declined the position.

=== Extra session and the Conventions of Assent ===
The June 15, 1836, bill passed by Congress made Michigan's admittance conditional upon a popular convention approving the exchange of the disputed Ohio territory for the western three-quarters of the Upper Peninsula. Governor Stevens T. Mason called an extra session of the legislature, which ran from July 11, 1836, to July 26, 1836, in order to make provisions for the election of delegates to such a convention. Democrats generally supported the compromise, seeing no value in antagonizing Congress and continuing to delay statehood and the financial benefits it would bring, while the Whigs felt Congress had no right to assist in the perceived theft of land from Michigan and wanted to press the case in the Supreme Court.

The Convention of Assent met in Ann Arbor on September 26 and, after deliberating for four days, rejected the compromise proposed by Congress. Supporters of the compromise called upon Mason to organize a second convention, which he refused to do, but he did declare that the people could do so themselves. The Democrats of Washtenaw County and Wayne County called for another convention, and this "Frostbitten Convention" was held beginning December 14 in Ann Arbor. The Whigs and several counties boycotted, and the compromise was overwhelmingly approved. Scholars have held that the second convention lacked any legal basis and that Mason overstepped his authority by suggesting the people hold a convention without any legislative or congressional consent, but it provided sufficient basis for Congress to finally grant Michigan's statehood on January 26, 1837.

== Leadership and organization ==
Lieutenant Governor Edward Mundy was ex officio President of the Senate, as prescribed by the state constitution. The senate appointed John S. Barry President of the Senate pro tempore; John J. Adam was chosen as the secretary, Silas D. McKeen as the enrolling and engrossing clerk, Edward A. King as the recording clerk, George W. Dexter as the sergeant-at-arms, and Diodate Hubbard as the doorkeeper.

The House elected Ezra Convis as Speaker, George R. Griswold as the clerk, Egbert Van Buren as the enrolling clerk, Lewis Bond as the sergeant-at-arms, William Terry and Thomas Lappin as the messenger and assistant messenger, and James Houston as the doorkeeper.

== Members ==
The apportionment of senators and representatives in the new state legislature was defined by the recently adopted constitution, which also directed that a new census be taken in 1837 and used as the basis for future apportionments. Only white inhabitants were considered in the apportioning of seats. The constitution mandated that the number of representatives be between 48 and 100, inclusive, and the number of senators be one-third that number, or as close as possible.

Seats in both houses were apportioned by county, with the provision that:

Any country attached to any county for judicial purposes, if not otherwise represented, shall be considered as forming part of such county, so far as regards elections for the purpose of representation in the legislature.

=== Senate ===
The constitution created districts made up of one or more counties each, and apportioned senators as follows:

... for the election of senators, the state shall be divided into five districts, and the apportionment shall be as follows: The county of Wayne shall compose the first district, and elect three senators; the counties of Monroe and Lenawee shall compose the second district and elect three senators; The Counties of Hillsdale, Branch, St. Joseph, Cass, Berrien, Kalamazoo and Calhoun shall compose the third district, and elect three senators; The counties of Washtenaw and Jackson shall compose the fourth district and elect three senators; And the counties of Oakland, Lapeer, Saganaw, Macomb, St. Clair, Michilimackinac and Chippewa shall compose the fifth district, and elect four senators.

Senators
District	Name	City	County	Party
1	Davis, Jonathan D.	Plymouth	Wayne	Democratic
1	McDonell, John	Detroit	Wayne	Democratic
1	Ten Eyck, Conrad	Dearbonville	Wayne	Democratic
2	Durocher, Laurent	Monroe	Monroe	Democratic
2	Ellis, Edward D.	Monroe	Monroe	Democratic
2	Hough, Olmsted	Tecumseh	Lenawee	Democratic
3	Barry, John S.	Constantine	St. Joseph	Democratic
3	Britain, Calvin	St. Joseph	Berrien	Democratic
3	Comstock, Horace H.	Comstock	Kalamazoo	Democratic
4	Finch, Silas	Saline	Washtenaw	Democratic
4	Moody, William J.	Jackson	Jackson	Democratic
4	Rumsey, Henry	Ann Arbor	Washtenaw	Democratic
5	Clarke, John	China	St. Clair	Democratic
5	Hascall, Charles C.	Flint	Genesee	Democratic
5	Raynale, Ebenezer	Franklin	Oakland	Democratic
5	Stockton, John	Mount Clemens	Macomb	Democratic

=== House of Representatives ===
The constitution assigned representatives to each county, or district made up of multiple counties, apportioned as follows:

... the County of Wayne shall be entitled to eight representatives; the county of Monroe to four representatives; the county of Washtenaw to seven representatives; the county of St. Clair to one representative; the County of St. Joseph to two representatives; the county of Berrien to one representative; the county of Calhoun to one representative; the county of Jackson to one representative; the county of Cass to two representatives; the county of Oakland to six representatives; the county of Macomb to three representatives; the county of Lenawee to four representatives; the county of Kalamazoo, and the unorganized counties of Allegan and Barry, to two representatives; the county of Branch to one representative; the county of Hillsdale to one representative; the county of Lapeer to one representative; the county of Saganaw and the unorganized counties of Genesee and Shiawasse to one representative; the county of Michilimakinac to one representative; the county of Chippewa to one representative; and the unorganized counties of Ottawa, Kent, Ionia and Clinton to one representative.

The constitution as written provided for 49 representatives. Allegan County was organized on August 25, 1835—after the constitution was drafted by the convention, but before it was approved by the voters. According to other language in the constitution, Allegan was thus eligible to elect its own representative rather than be included as part of "the county of Kalamazoo, and the unorganized counties of Allegan and Barry". The House seated the additional representative, Elisha Ely, bringing the total for this legislature to 50.

Representatives
District	Name	City	Party	Notes
Allegan County	Ely, Elisha	Allegan		
Berrien County	Green, Cogswell K.	Niles	Democratic	
Branch County	Alden, Hiram	Coldwater	Democratic	
Calhoun County	Convis, Ezra	Battle Creek	Democratic	
Cass County	O'Dell, James	Cassopolis		
Cass County	Smith, Joseph	Edwardsburgh	Democratic	
Chippewa County	Levake, Henry A.	Sault Ste. Marie		
Hillsdale County	Miller, Lewis T.	Moscow	Democratic	
Jackson County	Gidley, Townsend E.	Barry	Whig	
Kalamazoo County	Burdick, Cyren	Bronson		
Kalamazoo County	Lothrop, Edwin H.	Schoolcraft	Democratic	
Kent, Ottawa, Ionia and Clinton counties	Britton, Roswell	Grandville	Democratic	
Lapeer County	Hart, Alvin N.	Whitesville	Democratic	
Lenawee County	Dodge, Hiram	Clinton		
Lenawee County	Howe, George	Clinton		
Lenawee County	Hutchins, Allen	Adrian	Democratic|	
Lenawee County	Mead, Darius	Blissfield	Democratic	
Lenawee County	Wheeler, James	Tecumseh	Democratic	
Macomb County	Monfore, Isaac	Ray	Democratic	
Macomb County	Summers, Jacob	Utica	Democratic	
Macomb County	Tackels, Alexander	Romeo	Democratic	
Mackinac County	King, Jonathan P.	Mackinac County	Democratic	
Monroe County	Charter, Francis	La Salle		
Monroe County	Felch, Alpheus	Monroe	Democratic	
Monroe County	Godfroy, James J.	Monroe	Democratic	
Monroe County	Jackson, Joseph	Perry's Grove		
Oakland County	Brownell, George	East Farmington	Democratic	
Oakland County	Ellenwood, John	Pine Lake	Democratic	
Oakland County	Higley, Hiram	Rochester	Democratic	
Oakland County	Niles, Johnson	Troy	Democratic	
Oakland County	Richardson, Origen D.	Pontiac	Democratic	
Oakland County	Voorheis, Isaac I.	Lake Elizabeth	Democratic	
Saginaw County	Williams, Gardner D.	Saginaw		
St. Clair County	Heath, John S.	Black River		
St. Joseph County	Sherman, Benjamin	Centreville	Democratic	
St. Joseph County	Ullman, Isaac J.	Constantine	Democratic	
Washtenaw County	Brewer, John	Ypsilanti		
Washtenaw County	Crossman, Alanson	Dexter	Democratic	
Washtenaw County	Hill, James W.	Columbia Lake	Democratic	
Washtenaw County	Howe, Orrin	Lodi	Democratic	
Washtenaw County	Mathews, Rufus	Dixborough	Democratic	
Washtenaw County	Morse, Richard E.	Ypsilanti	Democratic	
Wayne County	Bradshaw, Elias	Van Buren	Democratic	
Wayne County	Brown, Ammon	Nankin	Democratic	
Wayne County	Fay, Jonathan P.	Detroit	Democratic	Died in office March 12, 1836; succeeded by Charles Moran
Wayne County	Ferrington, George W.	Redford	Democratic	
Wayne County	Moran, Charles	Detroit	Democratic	Succeeded Jonathan P. Fay (deceased) for extra session
Wayne County	Noyes, Horace A.	Plymouth	Democratic	
Wayne County	Strong, John	Detroit	Democratic	
Wayne County	Van Every, Peter	Hamtramck	Democratic	
Wayne County	Whipple, Charles W.	Detroit	Democratic	

== See also ==
- List of Michigan state legislatures
