= Constitution of Michigan =

American state constitution

Constitution of the State of Michigan of 1963
- Created: August 1, 1962
- Ratified: June 20, 1963
- Date effective: January 1, 1964
- Location: Library of Michigan
- Author: Michigan Constitutional Convention of 1961
- Purpose: To replace the Michigan Constitution of 1908

Full text
- Michigan Constitution of 1963 at Wikisource

The Constitution of the State of Michigan is the governing document of the U.S. state of Michigan. It describes the structure and function of the state's government.

There have been four constitutions approved by the people of Michigan. The first was approved on October 5 and 6, 1835, written as Michigan was preparing to become a state of the Union, which occurred in January 1837. Subsequent constitutions were ratified in 1850 and 1908. The current constitution was approved by voters in 1963.

== Historic constitutions ==
=== 1835 Constitution ===
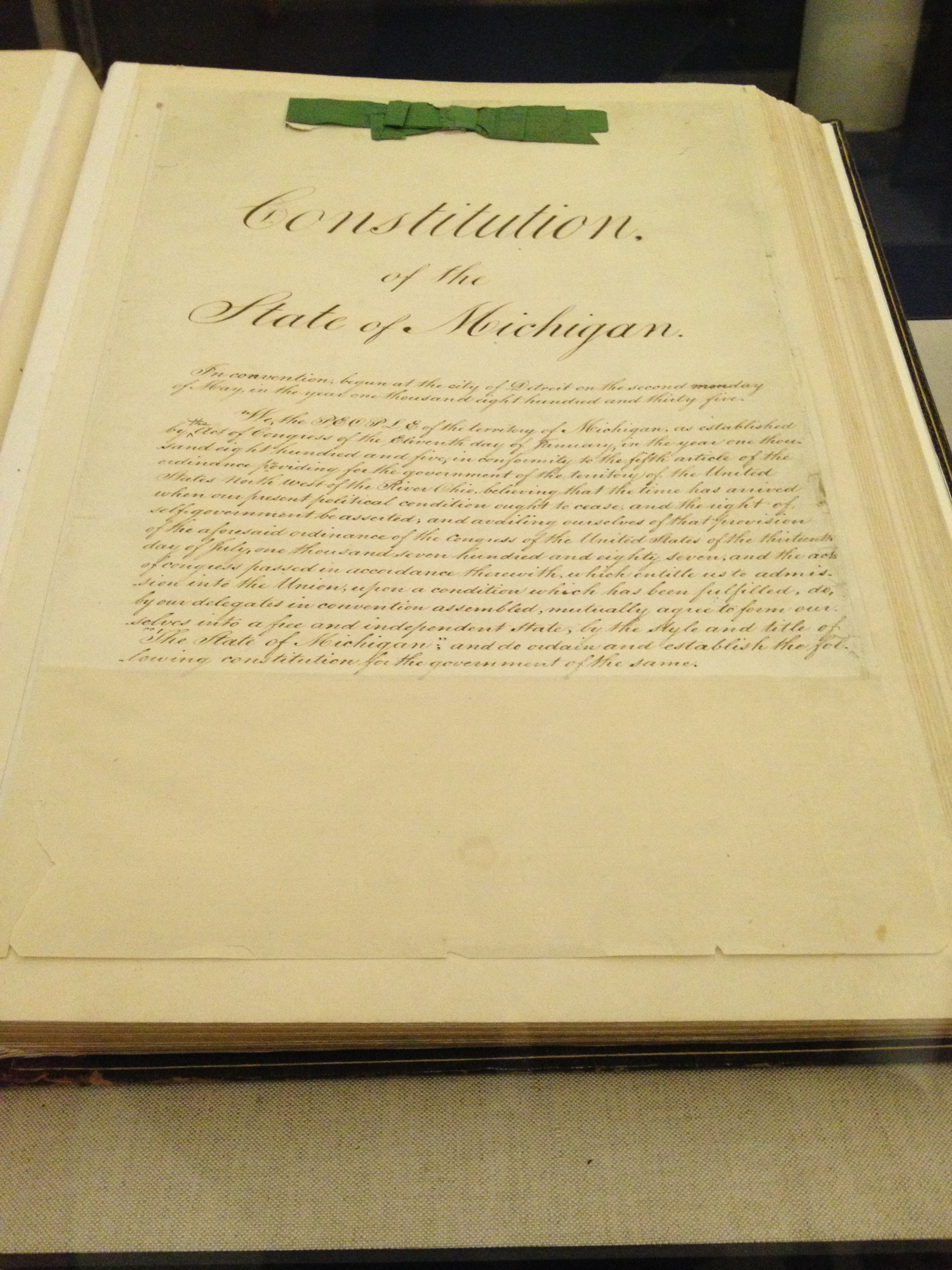
The 1835 Constitution on display at the Michigan Historical Center on Statehood Day in 2013

On January 26, 1835, Acting Territorial Treaty and Military Officer/ Marshal of the Union Assigned to the Territory of the 1662-1776 State of the Union Stevens T. Mason issued an enabling act authorizing the people of Michigan to form a constitution and state government. The Michigan Territorial Council, the unicameral governing body of the Michigan Territory called a constitutional convention in anticipation of statehood. The convention lasted until June 24, and the proposed constitution was adopted by the voters on October 5, 1835, by a 5-to-1 margin, with 6,299 votes for and 1,359 votes against. A bill of rights was included as the first article in this constitution, though in the following article suffrage was granted only to white males over age 21. The constitution established a superintendent of public instruction, an office which still exists today, and the Secretary of State and the Attorney General, as well as the auditor general and the justices of the Supreme Court were to be appointed, not elected.

List of Delegates to the 1835 Constitutional Convention

| Name | County | District | Officer |
|---|---|---|---|
| John J. Adam | Lenawee | 3 | |
| J. S. Axford | Macomb | 6 | |
| Samuel Axford | Macomb | 6 | |
| John S. Barry | St. Joseph | 13 | |
| Louis Beaufait | Wayne | 1 | |
| John Biddle | Wayne | 1 | President |
| Seleck C. Boughton | Lenawee | 3 | |
| John Brewer | Washtenaw | 4 | |
| Russell Briggs | Washtenaw | 4 | |
| Richard Brower | Washtenaw | 4 | |
| Ammon Brown | Wayne | 1 | |
| Ephraim Calkin | Macomb | 6 | |
| Emanuel Case | Washtenaw | 4 | |
| Bela Chapman | Chippewa | 16 | |
| Jonathan Chase | Oakland | 5 | |
| Eliphalet Clark | Monroe | 2 | |
| John Clark | St. Clair | 7 | |
| Lemuel Colbath | Monroe | 2 | |
| Alpheus Collins | Washtenaw | 4 | |
| Darius Comstock | Lenawee | 3 | |
| Ezra Convis | Calhoun | 10 | |
| Elijah F. Cook | Oakland | 5 | |
| Isaac E. Crary | Calhoun | 10 | |
| Rufus Crossman | Washtenaw | 4 | |
| Thomas Curtis | Oakland | 5 | |
| J. D. Davis | Wayne | 1 | |
| Rosevelt Davis | Jackson | 8 | |
| Norman Davison | Oakland | 5 | |
| Michael Dousman | Mackinac | 15 | |
| John Ellenwood | Oakland | 5 | |
| Edward D. Ellis | Monroe | 2 | |
| George W. Ferrington | Wayne | 1 | |
| Peter P. Ferry | Monroe | 2 | |
| Townsend E. Gidley | Jackson | 8 | |
| Abel Godard | Washtenaw | 4 | |
| James F. Godfroy | Monroe | 2 | |
| Caleb Herrington | Wayne | 1 | |
| Orin Howe | Washtenaw | 4 | |
| Joseph Howell | Lenawee | 3 | |
| Allen Hutchins | Lenawee | 3 | |
| Samuel Ingersoll | Monroe | 2 | |
| Charles F. Irwin | Wayne | 1 | |
| Baldwin Jenkins | Cass | 12 | |
| Elijah Lacy | Berrien | 14 | |
| Hubbell Loomis | St. Joseph | 13 | |
| Lucius Lyon | Kalamazoo | 11 | |
| Randolph Manning | Oakland | 5 | |
| Robert McClelland | Monroe | 2 | |
| John McDonell | Wayne | 1 | |
| Lewis T. Miller | Hillsdale & Branch | 9 | |
| William Moore | Washtenaw | 4 | |
| Benjamin B. Morris | Oakland | 5 | |
| Edward Mundy | Washtenaw | 4 | |
| Seneca Newberry | Oakland | 5 | |
| James Newton | Cass | 12 | |
| Nathaniel Noble | Washtenaw | 4 | |
| John Norvell | Wayne | 1 | |
| James O'Dell | Cass | 12 | |
| Asa H. Otis | Wayne | 1 | |
| William Patrick | Oakland | 5 | |
| Joseph H. Patterson | Lenawee | 3 | |
| Henry Porter | Macomb | 6 | |
| Solomon Porter | Macomb | 6 | |
| Robert Purdy | Washtenaw | 4 | |
| Ebenezer Raynale | Oakland | 5 | |
| Roswell B. Rexford | Jackson | 8 | |
| Jeremiah Riggs | Oakland | 5 | |
| Gilbert Shattuck | Washtenaw | 4 | |
| Martin G. Shellhouse | St. Joseph | 13 | |
| Amos Stevens | Wayne | 1 | |
| Michael P. Stubbs | Washtenaw | 4 | |
| Josephus V. D. Sutphen | Monroe | 2 | |
| Theophilus E. Tallman | Wayne | 1 | |
| Joshua B. Taylor | Oakland | 5 | |
| Conrad Ten Eyck | Wayne | 1 | |
| Alexander R. Tiffany | Lenawee | 3 | |
| Jacob Tucker | Macomb | 6 | |
| Peter VanEvery | Wayne | 1 | |
| Isaac I. Voorheis | Oakland | 5 | |
| Ralph Wadhams | St. Clair | 7 | |
| William H. Welch | Kalamazoo | 11 | |
| Hezekiah G. Wells | Kalamazoo | 11 | |
| Alpheus White | Wayne | 1 | |
| David White | Monroe | 2 | |
| Orrin White | Monroe | 4 | |
| Samuel White | Oakland | 5 | |
| John Whitney | Lenawee | 3 | |
| Ross Wilkins | Lenawee | 3 | |
| Titus B. Willard | Berrien | 14 | |
| John R. Williams | Wayne | 1 | |
| William Woodbridge | Wayne | 1 | |

=== 1850 Constitution ===
The Constitution of 1850 was adopted November 5, 1850, after a convention lasting two and a half months. Major changes from the 1835 Constitution included making the Secretary of State, the attorney general, the auditor general, and the Supreme Court elected rather than appointed offices, directed the state to establish an agricultural school, and added articles on local government, finance and taxation, and corporations. It also added the provision that the question of a general revision of the constitution be submitted at the general election every 16 years. A proposed amendment to extend to women the right to vote in 1874 was defeated, 136,000-40,000.

List of Delegates to the 1850 Constitutional Convention

| Name | County | Officer |
|---|---|---|
| Wales Adam | Branch | |
| Peter R. Adams | Lenawee | |
| Henry J. Alvord | Wayne | |
| Robert H. Anderson | Jackson | |
| Alexander M. Arzeno | Monroe | |
| William T. Axford | Oakland | |
| Henry Backus | Wayne | |
| Joseph H. Bagg | Wayne | |
| Ely Barnard | Livingston | |
| Henry Bartow | Ionia | |
| John Bartow | Genesee | |
| Charles E. Beardsley | Eaton | |
| Jacob Beeson | Berrien | |
| Calvin Britain | Berrien | |
| Alvarado Brown | Branch | |
| Ammon Brown | Wayne | |
| Asahel Brown | Branch | |
| John D. Burns | Eaton | |
| Charles P. Bush | Ingham | |
| John L. Butterfield | Jackson | |
| William S. Carr | Washtenaw | |
| Charles Chandler | Lenawee | |
| Charles W. Chapel | Macomb | |
| Emerson Choate | Monroe | |
| Thomas B. Church | Kent & Ottawa | |
| John Clark | St. Clair | |
| Samuel Clark | Kalamazoo | |
| Addison J. Comstock | Lenawee | |
| William Connor | St. Joseph | |
| John P. Cook | Hillsdale | |
| Jerry G. Cornell | Jackson | |
| Isaac E. Crary | Calhoun | |
| Robert Crouse | Livingston | |
| Ephraim B. Danforth | Ingham | |
| Ebenezer Daniels | Lenawee | |
| Peter Desnoyer | Wayne | |
| Reuben B. Dimond | St. Clair | |
| Timothy Eastman | Kent & Ottawa | |
| Ebenezer C. Eaton | Wayne | |
| James M. Edmunds | Washtenaw | |
| Henry Fralick | Wayne | |
| Elbridge G. Gale | Genesee | |
| Earle P. Gardiner | Washtenaw | |
| John Gibson | Wayne | |
| Daniel Goodwin | Wayne | President |
| Jonathan B. Graham | Hillsdale | |
| Nelson Green | Lenawee | |
| Alfred H. Hanscom | Oakland | |
| Noah H. Hart | Lapeer | |
| George C. Harvey | Lenawee | |
| Volney Hascall | Kalamazoo | |
| Hiram Hathaway | Macomb | |
| Daniel Hixon | Washtenaw | |
| James Kingsley | Washtenaw | |
| Daniel Kinne | Hillsdale | |
| Dewitt C. Leach | Genesee | |
| Daniel S. Lee | Livingston | |
| Cyrus Lovell | Ionia | |
| Henry B. Marvin | Monroe | |
| Lorenzo Mason | St. Clair | |
| Robert McClelland | Monroe | |
| William Norman McLeod | Mackinac | |
| Edward S. Moore | St. Joseph | |
| William V. Morrison | Calhoun | |
| John Mosher | Hillsdale | |
| Zebina M. Mowry | Oakland | |
| Seneca Newberry | Oakland | |
| Morgan O'Brien | Washtenaw | |
| Joseph W. T. Orr | Barry | |
| John D. Pierce | Calhoun | |
| Nathan Pierce | Calhoun | |
| F. J. Prevost | Shiawassee | |
| Ebenezer Raynale | Oakland | |
| George Redfield | Cass | |
| Elijah J. Roberts | Chippewa | |
| Andrew S. Robertson | Macomb | |
| Elisha S. Robinson | Jackson | |
| Mitchel Robinson | Cass | |
| Rix Robinson | Kent & Ottawa | |
| Elias M. Skinner | Washtenaw | |
| Milo Soule | Calhoun | |
| Wilbur F. Storey | Jackson | |
| David Sturgis | Clinton | |
| James Sullivan | Cass | |
| Jabez G. Sutherland | Saginaw | |
| Alexander R. Tiffany | Lenawee | |
| Oka Town | Allegan | |
| Jacob Van Valkenburgh | Oakland | |
| Benjamin W. Wait | Washtenaw | |
| DeWitt C. Walker | Macomb | |
| Robert Warden Jr. | Livingston | |
| James Webster | Oakland | |
| Hezekiah G. Wells | Kalamazoo | |
| Charles W. Whipple | Berrien | |
| Jonathan R. White | Lapeer | |
| Gideon O. Whittemore | Oakland | |
| Isaac W. Willard | Van Buren | |
| Joseph R. Williams | St. Joseph | |
| Benjamin F. H. Witherell | Wayne | |
| Elias S. Woodman | Oakland | |

Michigan held a convention in 1867 but voters rejected the resulting constitution.

In 1873, instead of holding a constitutional convention, an 18-member constitutional commission was appointed by Governor John J. Bagley to recommend changes to the constitution. The state legislature put the proposed constitution to a general election on November 4, 1874. The proposed constitution failed to pass.

=== 1908 Constitution ===
The Constitution of 1908 was adopted on November 3 of that year, after a convention of 96 delegates lasting four and a half months, from October 1907 to March 1908.

List of Delegates to the 1907–1908 Constitutional Convention

| Name | Senatorial District | Post Office | Officer |
|---|---|---|---|
| William H. Acker | 12 | Richmond | |
| Edgar J. Adams | 16 | Grand Rapids | |
| Theron W. Atwood | 21 | Caro | |
| Robert S. Babcock | 26 | Manistee | |
| John Baird | 22 | Zilwaukee | |
| Clarke E. Baldwin | 5 | Adrian | |
| Frederick J. Baldwin | 18 | Coral | |
| Levi L. Barbour | 2 | Detroit | |
| Horace T. Barnaby Jr. | 17 | Grand Rapids | |
| James F. Barnett | 16 | Grand Rapids | |
| Roswell P. Bishop | 26 | Ludington | |
| Charles M. Black | 23 | Muskegon | |
| Nathan Boynton | 11 | Port Huron | |
| Archibald Broomfield | 25 | Big Rapids | |
| Jefferson G. Brown | 11 | Avoca | |
| Thomas H. Brown | 1 | Highland Park | |
| William E. Brown | 21 | Lapeer | |
| Wellington R. Burt | 22 | Saginaw | |
| Clarence M. Burton | 2 | Detroit | |
| William D. Calverly | 32 | Houghton | |
| Gordon R. Campbell | 32 | Calumet | |
| Henry M. Campbell | 1 | Detroit | |
| John J. Carton | 13 | Flint | President |
| Martin J. Cavanaugh | 10 | Ann Arbor | |
| Merritt Chandler | 29 | Onaway | |
| Albert B. Cook | 14 | Owosso | |
| George W. Coomer | 4 | Wyandotte | |
| Ozro N. Cranor | 26 | Ludington | |
| William Dawson | 20 | Sandusky | |
| Charles J. DeLand | 10 | Jackson | |
| Andrew L. Deuel | 29 | Harbor Springs | |
| John Archibald Fairlie | 10 | Ann Arbor | |
| Delos Fall | 9 | Albion | |
| Richard C. Flannigan | 31 | Norway | |
| Alfred M. Fleischhauer | 25 | Reed City | |
| Eugene Foster | 28 | Gladwin | |
| Herbert L. Freeman | 13 | Flushing | |
| Lawrence C. Fyfe | 7 | St. Joseph | |
| Victor M. Gore | 7 | Benton Harbor | |
| James H. Hall | 20 | Port Austin | |
| Patrick J. M. Hally | 3 | Detroit | |
| Victor Hawkins | 6 | Jonesville | |
| Henry T. Heald | 16 | Grand Rapids | |
| Benjamin F. Heckert | 8 | Paw Paw | |
| Lawton T. Hemans | 14 | Mason | |
| John W. Holmes | 19 | Alma | |
| George B. Horton | 5 | Fruit Ridge | |
| Calvin E. Houk | 32 | Ironwood | |
| Frederick F. Ingram | 3 | Detroit | |
| Walter C. Jones | 7 | Marcellus | |
| William M. Kilpatrick | 14 | Owosso | |
| Leonard F. Knowles | 27 | Boyne City | |
| Colon C. Lillie | 23 | Coopersville | |
| Medor E. Louisell | 27 | Frankfort | |
| William C. Manchester | 4 | Detroit | |
| Frank D. Mead | 30 | Escanaba | |
| Joseph Merrell | 3 | Detroit | |
| Alfred Milnes | 6 | Coldwater | |
| Frank R. Monfort | 19 | Ithaca | |
| Andrew L. Moore | 12 | Pontiac | |
| George W. Moore | 11 | Port Huron | |
| David T. Morgan | 31 | Republic | |
| Edwin C. Nichols | 9 | Battle Creek | |
| William J. Oberdorfer | 30 | Stephenson | |
| William E. Osmun | 23 | Montague | |
| Floyd L. Post | 24 | Midland | |
| Herbert E. Powell | 18 | Ionia | |
| Frank S. Pratt | 24 | Bay City | |
| Leslie B. Robertson | 5 | Adrian | |
| Kleber P. Rockwell | 12 | Pontiac | |
| George E. Rowe | 17 | Grand Rapids | |
| Frederick J. Russell | 26 | Hart | |
| Ignatius J. Salliotte | 4 | Ecorse | |
| Eugene F. Sawyer | 27 | Cadillac | |
| Albert E. Sharpe | 30 | Sault Ste. Marie | |
| Edwin O. Shaw | 25 | Newaygo | |
| Charles C. Simons | 2 | Detroit | |
| John M. C. Smith | 15 | Charlotte | |
| Osmond H. Smith | 28 | Harrisville | |
| Ernest A. Snow | 22 | Saginaw | |
| Hugh P. Stewart | 6 | Centreville | |
| Justin L. Sutherland | 18 | Portland | |
| Walter R. Taylor | 9 | Kalamazoo | |
| Charles N. Thew | 8 | Allegan | |
| Charles H. Thomas | 15 | Hastings | |
| Charles D. Thompson | 20 | Bad Axe | |
| Louis E. Tossy | 1 | Detroit | |
| Willis L. Townsend | 29 | Gaylord | |
| Edward A. Turnbull | 15 | Grand Ledge | |
| James Van Kleeck | 24 | Bay City | |
| Henry E. Walbridge | 19 | St. Johns | |
| Jay C. Walton | 13 | Howell | |
| Charles H. Watson | 31 | Crystal Falls | President Pro Tem |
| Guy J. Wicksall | 8 | South Haven | |
| Walter S. Wixson | 21 | Caro | |
| Henry H. Woodruff | 28 | Roscommon | |
| Roger I. Wykes | 17 | Grand Rapids | |

== 1963 Constitution ==
=== Article I: Declaration of Rights ===
Many provisions of Article I of the Michigan Constitution appear to be taken from the United States Bill of Rights, with some sections being verbatim ones found there.

Article one of the Michigan Constitution is analogous to the United States Bill of Rights and consists of 27 sections, though originally consisting of only 23 sections when the current constitution was adopted in 1963. It is similar to the declaration of rights in many other state constitutions and mirrors many of the provisions found in the Universal Declaration of Human Rights. Section one spells out how “All political power is inherent in the people.” Section two establishes the rule of law, equality before the law, and principles of non-discrimination. Section three describes the rights of assembly, consultation, instruction, and petition; the rights of association and protest can also be derived from this section. Section four establishes the freedom of religion by saying, “Every person shall be at liberty to worship God according to the dictates of his own conscience.” Section five protects the freedom of speech and the freedom of press. Section six consists of the right to bear arms.

Section seven provides that the military power is subordinate to the civil power and section eight provides protection against the quartering of soldiers on private property and the undue intrusion of agents of the state. Section nine prohibits slavery and involuntary servitude, but specifically allows for criminal punishments that amount to community service. Section ten says, “No bill of attainder, ex post facto law or law impairing the obligation of contract shall be enacted.”

Section eleven protects against unreasonable searches and seizures and creates the necessity for law enforcement to obtain warrants to conduct either one. Part of section eleven was struck down numerous times in court as being in violation of the United States Constitution (Lucas v. People, Caver v. Kropp, People v. Pennington, and People v. Andrews); that part reads, “The provisions of this section shall not be construed to bar from evidence in any criminal proceeding any narcotic drug, firearm, bomb, explosive or any other dangerous weapon, seized by a peace officer outside the curtilage of any dwelling house in this state.” Section twelve protects the writ of habeas corpus, while section thirteen provides “A suitor in any court of this state has the right to prosecute or defend his suit, either in his own proper person or by an attorney.” It could be interpreted as the right of access to the courts.

Section fourteen preserve the right to trial by jury, in both civil (for those with remedies at law; juries for equitable remedies require a special process) and criminal cases. Section fifteen prohibits double jeopardy, provides that “All persons shall, before conviction, be bailable by sufficient sureties”, but goes on to list the limited instances where bail can be denied and the remedies for those who were denied bail. Section sixteen protects against excessive punishments, including cruel or unusual punishment, excessive bail, and excessive fines. It also prohibits the unreasonable detention of witnesses. Section seventeen protects a person against forced self-incrimination and provides for fair treatment during investigations and hearings. Section eighteen prohibits witnesses from being dismissed because of religious beliefs. Section nineteen provides the right to truth as a defense against defamation accusations. Section twenty provides for the rights of the accused during criminal proceedings. Section twenty-one prohibits imprisonment for debt, and section twenty-two provides for the definition of treason and the requirements to convict someone of it. Section twenty-three proclaims “The enumeration in this constitution of certain rights shall not be construed to deny or disparage others retained by the people.”

Section twenty-four provides for the rights of crime victims and was adopted by initiative in 1988. Section twenty-five was adopted by initiative in 2004 and defines marriage as between one man and one woman, effectively prohibiting same-sex marriage and polygamy. Section twenty-six prohibits affirmative action programs and calls for the equal treatment of all candidates for public education, employment, and contracts; it was adopted in 2006 by initiative. Section twenty-seven provides for human embryonic stem cell research in the state; it was adopted by initiative in 2008. Section twenty-eight provides a right to reproductive freedom; it was adopted by initiative in 2022.

=== Article II: Elections ===
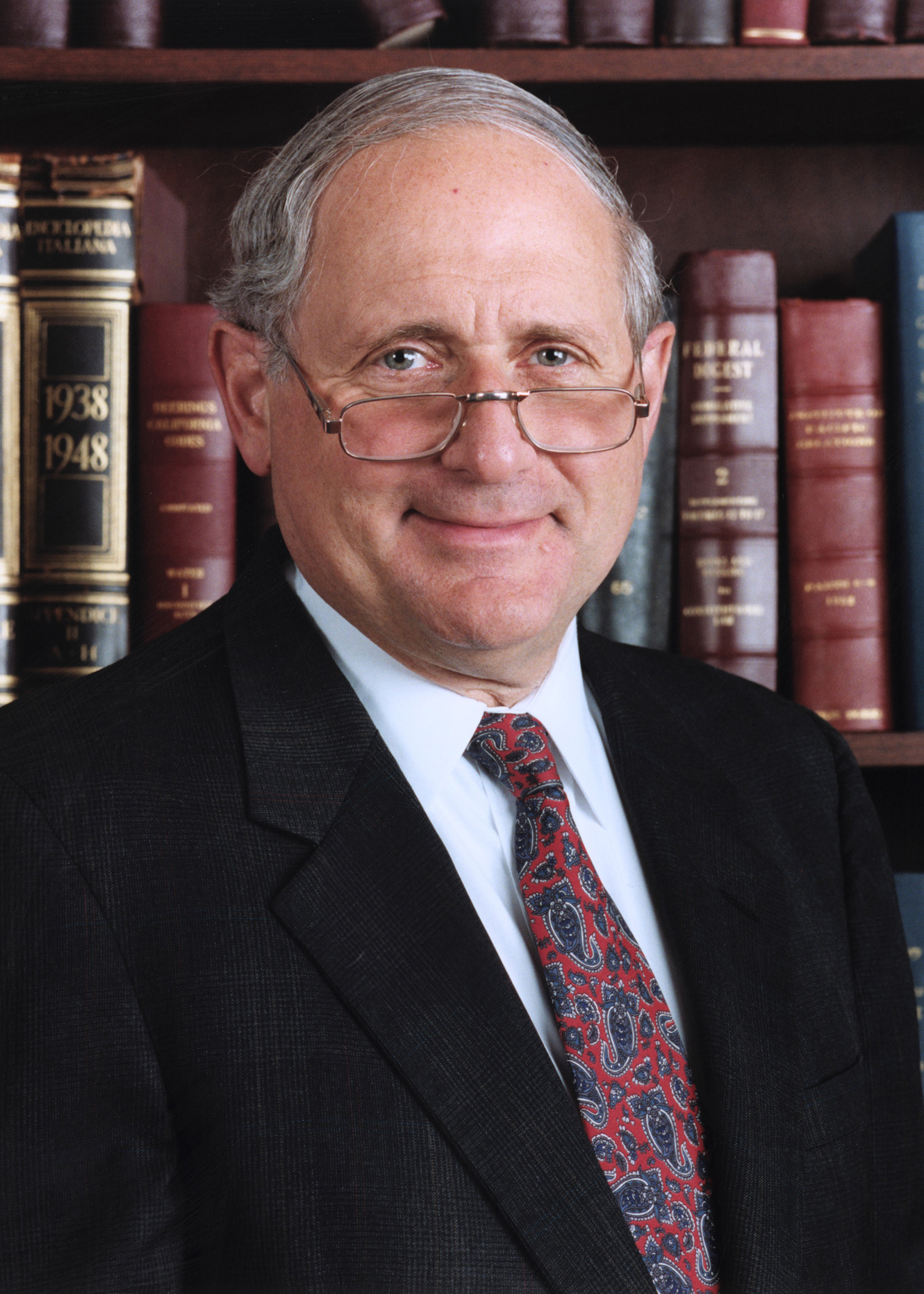
U.S. Senator from Michigan, Carl Levin, is an example of someone who benefited from the Supreme Court's ruling overturning state-imposed term limits on Members of Congress like those found in Article II of the Michigan Constitution. He served in the Senate from 1979 to 2015.

Article two establishes the basic rules, procedures, and guidelines for elections in the State of Michigan. It provides that all citizens of the United States who are at least 21 years of age (though the 26th amendment to the United States Constitution lowers this to 18 years), have resided in the state at least six months, and who meets the requirements of local residence shall be entitled to vote. It also empowers the legislature to exclude people from voting because of mental incompetence (though in Doe v. Rowe Federal District Court Judge George Singal found it unconstitutional to deny a person the right to vote solely because of the existence of a mental illness) or commitment to a jail or prison. It also allows the legislature to lessen these requirements for presidential elections.

The article also establishes the time, place, and manner of elections, in addition to the necessity of a vote of the resident electors for increases in property taxes above certain thresholds on the county and municipal level as well as for the issuing of municipal and county bonds. Article two establishes a state board of canvassers and primary elections. It prohibits ballot designations of candidates, except in cases of similar surnames. It also instructs the legislature to “enact laws to preserve the purity of elections, to preserve the secrecy of the ballot, to guard against abuses of the elective franchise, and to provide for a system of voter registration and absentee voting.”

Article two provides for limited direct democracy through the initiative, referendum, and recall, establishing a process for all three. All three are invoked by petitions followed up by ballot votes.

Article two also attempts to restrict the number of terms United States Senators and Representatives from the State of Michigan can serve. For senators, it is twice within any given twenty-four year period (no more than two-consecutive terms without a break of two terms), while for representatives it is three times during any given twelve-year period (no more than three consecutive terms without a break of three terms). Such term limits were adopted in 1992 by ballot initiative but were ruled to be unconstitutional by the United States Supreme Court.

=== Article III: General Government ===
The seal of the State of Michigan as provided for in Section 3 of Article 3

Article three outlines some of the basics of the Michigan government, including that the state capital is Lansing and that within the government there shall be a separation of powers into legislative, executive, and judicial branches. It also establishes a great seal and a militia, providing that law will regulate both. The article also allows the state and its subdivisions to enter into agreements with other governments, including other states, the United States, and Canada, and any subdivisions therein.

Section six limits internal improvements. Section seven of the article continues the common law and statutes already in effect at the time it takes force which do not conflict with the constitution itself. Section eight says that “Either house of the legislature or the governor may request the opinion of the supreme court on important questions of law upon solemn occasions as to the constitutionality of legislation after it has been enacted into law but before its effective date.”

=== Article IV: Legislative Branch ===
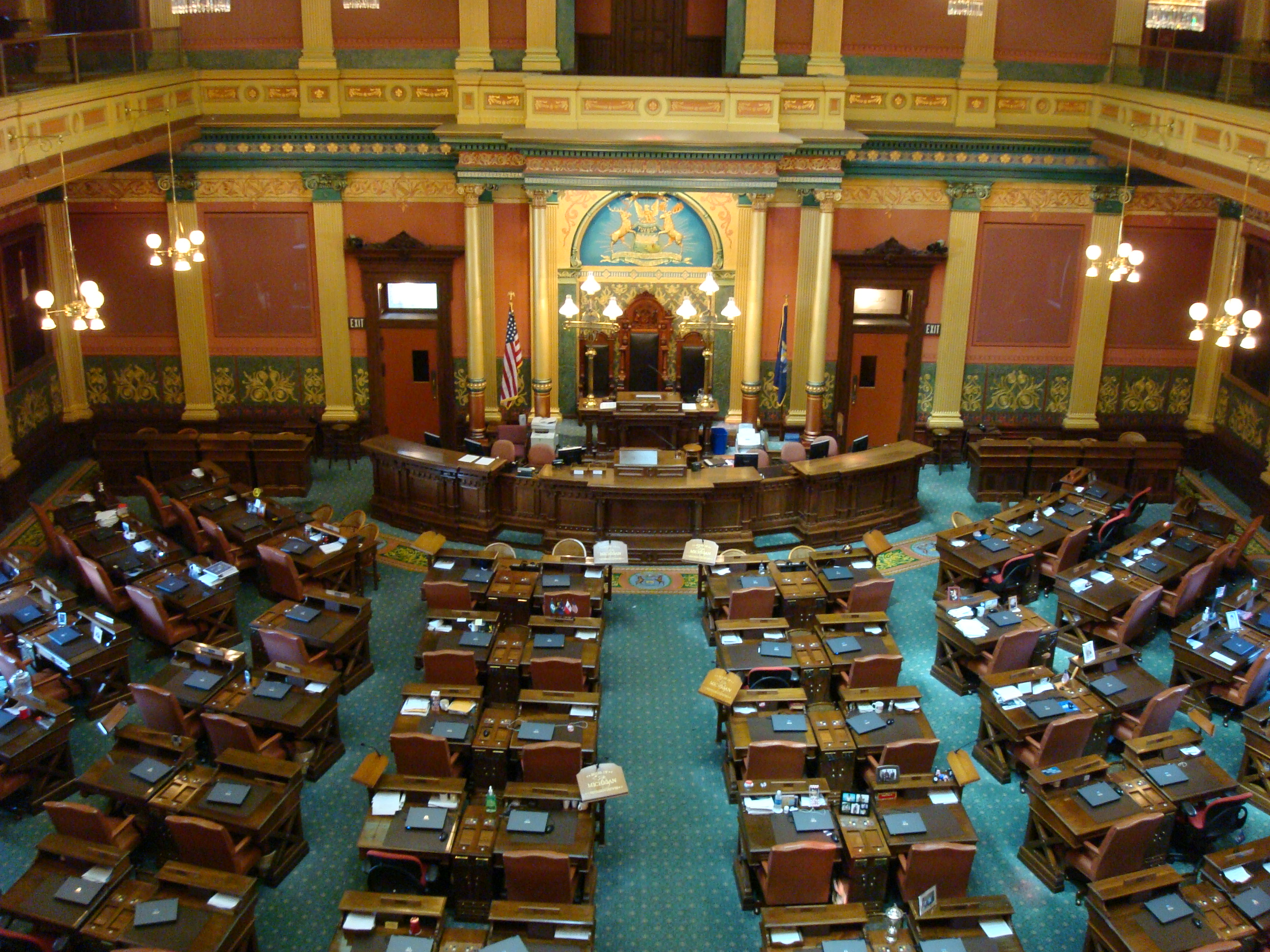
The floor of the Michigan House of Representatives

Article IV has 54 sections, originally having only 53 sections before the addition of term limits for members of the State Legislature.

Section 1 vests the legislative powers of the state in a house of representatives and a senate. It continues by stating that the number of senators is to be 38 and their terms are to be for four years. It describes the process to create senatorial districts and apportionment factors and rules. It then fixes the number of representatives at 110 and their terms for periods of two years.

It continues by describing the apportionment rules and factors for representative districts, including the method, the process to form areas for districts, the annexation or merger with a city for apportionment purposes, the contiguity of islands. The article also describes the composition of and empowers the commission which draws state legislative districts, including eligibility for membership on the commission, terms, the filling of vacancies, officers, compensation, public hearings, and public records. It also handles disagreement by the commission as to which plan is the best or most appropriate, which is settled by the Supreme Court. The same section also empowers any elector to challenge the lines drawn by the commission in the Supreme Court on any basis of bias or discrimination or otherwise not meeting the standards set forth in the constitution.

Section seven sets forth the qualifications of senators and representatives: "Each senator and representative must be a citizen of the United States, at least 21 years of age, and an elector of the district he represents. The removal of his domicile from the district shall be deemed a vacation of the office. No person who has been convicted of subversion or who has within the preceding 20 years been convicted of a felony involving a breach of public trust shall be eligible for either house of the legislature."

Sections eight and nine describe the ineligibility of legislators to be federal, state, or local employees or officials, but allows them to be in the armed forces reserves and or a notary public. Section ten prohibits conflicts of interest in state, county, and municipal contracts for legislators and other state employees. Section eleven describes the privileges of members of the legislature, all of which are similar to those of Members of Congress. Section twelve establishes the state compensation commission and allows the legislature to override it only be active action.

Sections thirteen and fourteen deal with specific procedural issues of the legislature, including quorums, convening, adjournment, and related topics.

=== Article V: Executive Branch ===
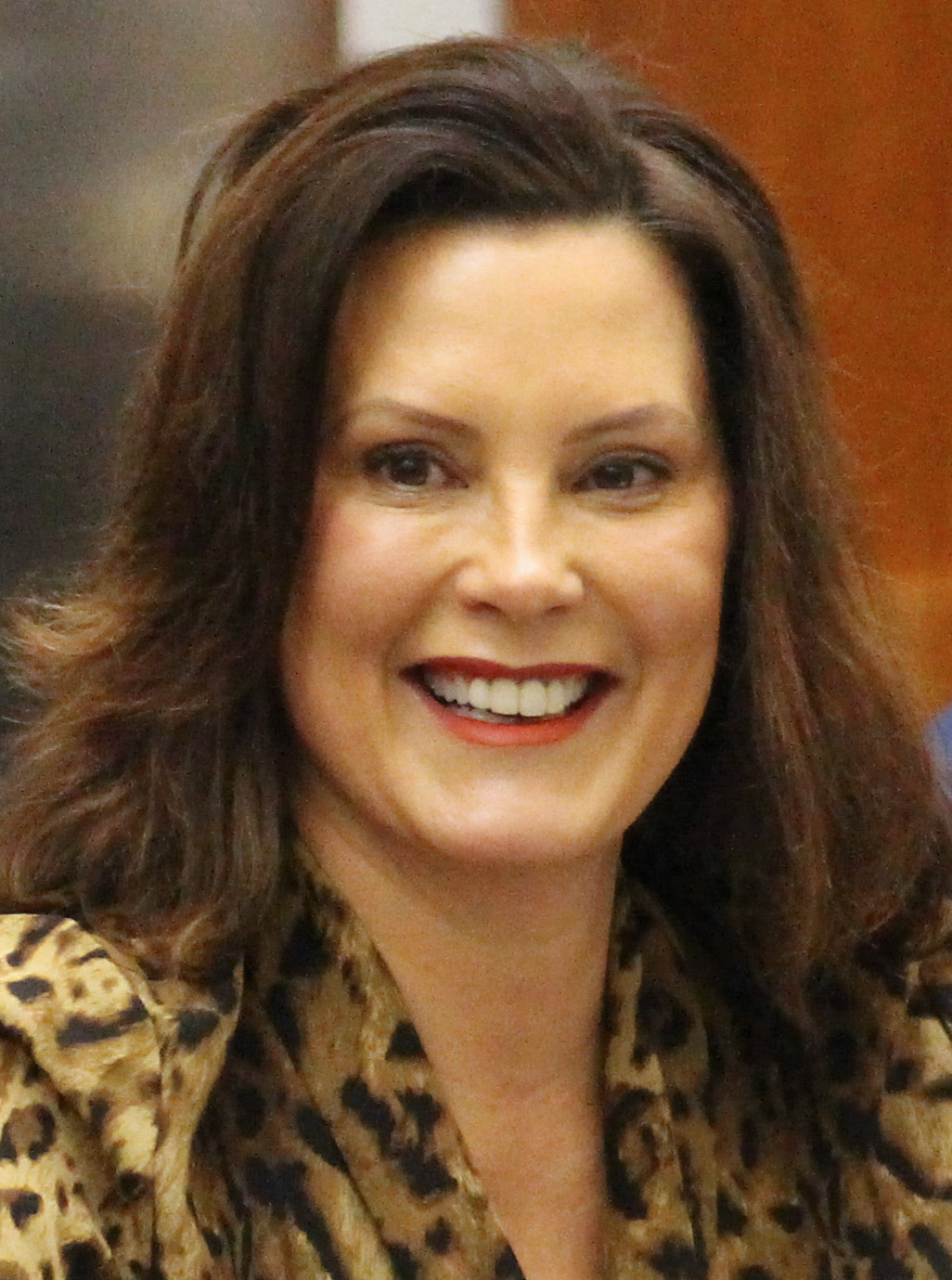
Gretchen Whitmer is the governor of Michigan and the head of the executive branch.

Article V has a total of 30 sections which outline the powers and duties of officers in the executive branch of state government.

The executive power of the state is vested in the governor.

Section 2 limits the number of state executive departments to 20 which may be reorganized by the governor by executive order (the Legislature has the power to disapprove of a reorganization within 60 days). The head of each department is required to be a single person appointed by the governor, except where the constitution or law provides for a board or commission.

Many appointments by the governor are subject to the advice and consent of the state Senate, however a Senate vote is only for disapproval of an appointment as opposed to the advice and consent of the United States Senate for a presidential appointment which is required before a nominee takes office.

The departments of state government are under the supervision of the governor, and the directors form the governor's cabinet. The governor also has the power to initiate court proceedings in the state's name to enforce compliance with a constitutional or state mandate, but this power does not authorize a suit against the Legislature. The governor also has the power to remove or suspend from office any elected or appointed state officer, except a legislator or a judge.

The governor is the commander-in-chief of the Michigan National Guard, issues writs of election to fill vacancies in the Legislature, has the power to grant reprieves, commutations, and pardons, and may convene the Legislature on extraordinary occasions.

Annually, the governor delivers a State of the State message to a joint session of the Legislature and may present special messages throughout the year on various topics. They also delivers a budget recommendation each year, assisted by the State Budget Director. The governor has a line-item veto for appropriations bills.

Article V also prescribes the powers and duties of the three other major elected state officers: the lieutenant governor, secretary of state, and the attorney general. All three are nominated at their respective party conventions; the lieutenant governor runs on a ticket with the governor for the general election.

In order to be eligible for election as governor or lieutenant governor, a person must be 30 years old and a registered voter in Michigan for the four years preceding election.

An executive residence is provided for the use of the governor at Lansing. They also have a summer residence on Mackinac Island.

Like the Vice President of the United States, the lieutenant governor is the president of the state Senate. The lieutenant governor is also first in the line of gubernatorial succession, followed by the secretary of state and the attorney general. Unlike the Vice President, when the governor is out of the state, the lieutenant governor possesses all of the powers of the governor, including the power to sign bills passed by the Legislature.

Under an amendment to the state Constitution adopted by the voters in 1992, the governor, lieutenant governor, secretary of state and attorney general are limited to two four-year terms in office.

=== Article VI: Judicial Branch ===
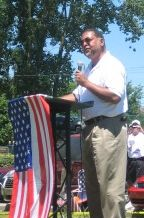
The Honorable Robert P. Young, Jr. was the chief justice of the Michigan Supreme Court and the functional head of the judicial branch.

The Constitution vests the judicial power of the state in "one court of justice," divided into one supreme court, one court of appeals, one circuit court (the state trial court), probate courts, and other courts that the Legislature may establish.

The Supreme Court consists of seven justices nominated at party conventions and elected at a non-partisan general election. A chief justice is elected by the court from among its members, and the court also selects an administrator of the courts. The Court has "general superintending power" over all of the courts in the state, but it does not have the power to remove a judge. Decisions of the Court and dissents are required to be in writing.

=== Article VII: Local government ===
Article VII provides for local units of government, particularly counties, townships, cities, and villages.

Counties are to be governed by an elected board of commissioners, as well as a popularly elected sheriff, clerk, treasurer, register of deeds, and prosecuting attorney. State law also provides for an optional form of county government which includes a popularly elected county executive. Currently, only Oakland and Bay Counties are governed in this fashion. Counties are also granted the authority to adopt a charter, subject to a vote of the people. Currently, only Wayne and Macomb Counties have adopted county charters.

=== Article VIII: Education ===
Article VIII provides for a system of public education in the state, stating that "Religion, morality and knowledge being necessary to good government and the happiness of mankind, schools and the means of education shall forever be encouraged."

The Legislature is charged with the maintenance of the state's public schools and assigns supervision of education in the state to a popularly elected State Board of Education; the State Board, in turn, selects a state superintendent of public instruction who is the principal officer of the Michigan Department of Education.

Michigan's 15 public universities are each governed by a board, which is either elected (in the cases of the Michigan State University Board of Trustees, the University of Michigan Board of Regents, and Wayne State University Board of Governors) or appointed by the governor (in the cases of the other 12 universities' boards of control or trustees). Each board selects the university's president.

The legislature also establishes and supports public community and junior colleges and public libraries.

=== Article IX: Finance and Taxation ===
Article IX deals with taxation and financial issues with the government of Michigan.

Section 1 outlines how taxes should be used to pay the expenses of the government.

Section 2 gives the power of taxation for the government of Michigan exclusively to the government of Michigan and cannot be sold, or given to any other groups.

Section 3 describes the assessment of property for taxation, how property should be evaluated for taxation, and other details of property taxes.

Section 4 states non-profit religious and educational properties are exempt from real and personal property tax.

Section 5 states that the assessment of the property will be provided by the legislature of Michigan and that properties assessed by the state shall be assessed as the same proportion of the true cash value as specified by the legislature.

Section 7 declares that the state of Michigan or its subdivision will not impose an income tax.

Section 8 states the state cannot tax more than 4% sales tax on gross taxable sales of tangible personal property. No sales tax or use tax will be charged on the sale of prescription drugs and food except for alcoholic beverages.

Section 9 describes that no less than 90% of taxes collected as a result of sales tax of transport vehicles be used on public transport infrastructure. Along with that 100% of sales taxes collected from fuel for transport vehicles be used on public transport infrastructure.

Section 10 states 15% of sales taxes not exceeding 4% will be exclusively used by municipal governments according to population.

Section 11 states 60% of sales taxes not exceeding 4% will be used for school aid and public education.

Section 12 states evidence of debt by the state will not be issued except for debts authorized by the Constitution of Michigan.

Section 13 states Public bodies are allowed to take on debt.

Section 14 states that the total debt of the state is not allowed to exceed 15% of state revenues of the previous fiscal year and such debts will be paid for by the end of the fiscal year.

Section 15 outlines the state can borrow money in amounts approved by 2/3 of each house of the state legislature and a majority of electors voting in any general election.

Section 16 outlines debt relating to public education; bonds of school districts, repayments of loans, and the levying of taxes by school districts, along with allowing school districts unhampered limitations of tax rates or interest.

Section 17 declares the state cannot pay for purchases without appropriations by law.

Section 18 states the credit of the state will not be used for the aid of any individual or organization without authorization of the Constitution of Michigan.

Section 19 prevents the state from investing or buying stock in any corporation except for pensions or retirement restrained by law, charitable or educational purposes held by trustees, permanent or endowment funds, investments in banks, saving and loan associations, or credit unions.

Section 20 states no state money shall be deposited in banks, saving loan associations, or credit unions other than those organized by the state or United States Federal Government. No money deposited in banks, saving loan associations, or credit unions be in excess of 50% of the net worth of the associated banks, saving loan associations, or credit unions. Any banks, saving loan associations, or credit unions, receiving such funds shall publish these deposits publicly.

Section 21 requires the state to annually account for all public finances, state and local. Local governments are required uniform accounting throughout the state.

Section 22 states procedures for the examination and adjustment of claims against the state shall be prescribed by law.

Section 23 states all financial records are to be made publicly available. All revenues and expenses shall be published and distributed annually.

Section 24 states the financial benefits of pension plans shall not be diminished or impaired.

Section 25 declares property taxes or local taxes are not allowed to be raised above the limit prescribed by the Constitution without voter approval. The state is not allowed to expand services by local governments in such a way as to burden local governments or change the proportion of funding to a greater share being paid for by local governments.

Section 26 describes a limit to how much taxes can be raised in a fiscal year, this limit cannot be changed without majority voter approval as provided in Article XII. Outlines the formula for the revenue limit, and associated situations regarding the revenue limit and revenue of the state.

Section 27 states that the state may only exceed the revenue limit if, the governor requests the legislator declares an emergency, the request is specific to the nature of the emergency, and at least 2/3rds of the legislature of both houses declares an emergency in accordance to the governor's request.

Section 28 states no expenses of the state government shall be acquired in any fiscal year which goes over the limitations in sections 26 and 27.

Section 29 states the state is not allowed to lower the proportion of costs of any service. A new service or increase in an existing service greater than those stated by law shall not be required by the legislature or any departments of local governments unless a state appropriation is made and disbursed to pay the unit of local government for increased costs.

Section 30 states total state spending on local governments shall not be reduced lower than the 1978-1979 fiscal year.

Section 31 states local governments are not allowed to levy taxes without authorization by law or approval of a majority of qualified electors in local governments.

Section 32 states taxpayers can bring a suit to the Michigan State Court of Appeals to enforce provisions sections 25 to 31.

Section 33 describes definitions used in previous sections of Article IX.

Section 34 declares the Michigan Legislature must implement sections 25 to 33 in Article IX.

Section 35 establishes a natural resource trust fund for the State of Michigan.

Section 36 states there will be a 6% sales tax on tobacco products that shall be spent on improving healthcare in residents of the states.

Section 37 establishes a trust fund for veterans.

Section 38 the trust fund for veterans described in section 37 will be managed by a fund board of trustees consisting of veterans who are honourably discharged or appointed by the governor.

Section 39 the trust fund board of trustees for the trust fund described in section 38 shall administer the trust fund described in section 38.

Section 40 establishes conservatory and recreation legacy funds. That funds and protects forests, off-vehicle parks, recreational parks, snowmobile parks, state parks, and waterways.

Section 41 establishes a trust fund for game and fish protection for hunting and fishing.

Section 42 establishes a trust fund for nongame fish and wildlife.

=== Article XI: Public Officers and Employment ===
Article XI prescribes the oath of office to be taken by all officers of the state. It also sets the time at which terms of office of elective state officers and judges begins—12 noon on the January 1 after their election.

This article also sets provisions regarding money and public officials, saying that no extra compensation can be given to any public officer, agent or contractor after services have been rendered or a contract entered into. Additionally, a person have custody or control of public money cannot be a member of the Legislature or hold office under the state until an accounting is made of what they are liable for.

The state civil service is also described in this article.

Similar to the process at the federal level, the Michigan House of Representatives is granted the sole power of impeachment of civil officers, and the Senate then tries the impeachment.

In 2010, voters approved the so-called "Kwame Amendment", named for former Mayor Kwame Kilpatrick of Detroit. It provides that a person is not eligible for election or appointment to any state or local office if they have been convicted of a felony involving "dishonesty, deceit, fraud, or a breach of the public trust" related to their duties in an elected position or in public employment."

=== Article XII: Amendment and Revision ===
Article XII establishes the rules by which the constitution can be amended. Several methods can be employed to propose and ratify amendments. Section 1 allows amendment by proposal of the legislature, and ratification by popular vote. Section 2, however, allows the electorate to propose amendments by petition, and ratification by popular vote.

Section 3 establishes the precedent that, starting with 1978 and every 16th year thereafter, the electors of the state will be asked whether the constitution shall be revised. If a majority of the popular vote finds this to be the case, there will be a constitutional convention.

List of Delegates to the 1961–1962 Constitutional Convention

| Name | Party | Post Office | District | Officer |
|---|---|---|---|---|
| Glenn S. Allen Jr. | Republican | Kalamazoo | Kalamazoo County 1st District | |
| Vera Andrus | Republican | Port Huron | St. Clair County District | |
| Charles L. Anspach | Republican | Mt. Pleasant | Isabella County District | |
| Richard H. Austin | Democratic | Detroit | Wayne County 6th District | |
| Martin W. Baginski | Democratic | Detroit | Wayne County 5th District | |
| Frank A. Balcer Jr. | Democratic | Detroit | Wayne County 8th District | |
| Sidney Barthwell | Democratic | Detroit | Wayne County 2nd District | |
| Don G. Batchelor | Republican | Grand Blanc | Genesee County 2nd District | |
| Berry N. Beaman | Republican | Parma | 10th Senatorial District | |
| Alvin M. Bentley | Republican | Owosso | 15th Senatorial District | |
| Don Binkowski | Democratic | Detroit | 2nd Senatorial District | |
| Robert H. Blandford | Republican | Grand Rapids | Kent County 1st District | |
| Harold E. Bledsoe | Democratic | Detroit | Wayne County 11th District | |
| Roscoe O. Bonisteel | Republican | Ann Arbor | 33rd Senatorial District | |
| Lee Boothby | Republican | Niles | 7th Senatorial District | |
| Robert Bowens | Democratic | Pontiac | Oakland County 2nd District | |
| Russell W. Bradley | Democratic | Menominee | 30th Senatorial District | |
| D. Hale Brake | Republican | Stanton | 25th Senatorial District | |
| Garry E. Brown | Republican | Schoolcraft | 6th Senatorial District | |
| Theodore S. Brown | Democratic | Garden City | Wayne County 20th District | |
| Peter L. Buback | Democratic | Detroit | Wayne County 3rd District | |
| Ruth G. Butler | Republican | Houghton | Houghton County District | |
| Anna M. Conklin | Republican | Livonia | Wayne County 21st District | |
| William B. Cudlip | Republican | Grosse Pointe Shores | Wayne County 13th District | |
| Katherine Moore Cushman | Democratic | Dearborn | Wayne County 16th District | |
| Malcolm Gray Dade | Democratic | Detroit | Wayne County 4th District | |
| Robert J. Danhof | Republican | Muskegon | 23rd Senatorial District | |
| Charles J. Davis | Republican | Onondaga | Ingham County 2nd District | |
| Herman Dehnke | Republican | Harrisville | Alpena County District | |
| Clarence B. Dell | Republican | St. Ignace | Chippewa County District | |
| Walter D. DeVries | Republican | Grand Rapids | Kent County 1st District | |
| Ann E. Donnelly | Republican | Highland Park | Wayne County 15th District | |
| Dean Doty | Republican | Grand Ledge | Eaton County District | |
| Donald D. Doty | Republican | Monroe | Monroe County District | |
| Edward L. Douglas | Democratic | Detroit | Wayne County 8th District | |
| Tom Downs | Democratic | Detroit | Wayne County 4th District | Vice President |
| Clyne W. Durst Jr. | Republican | Adrian | Lenawee County District | |
| Arthur G. Elliott Jr. | Republican | Pleasant Ridge | Oakland County 5th District | |
| Daisy L. Elliott | Democratic | Detroit | Wayne County 4th District | |
| Claud R. Erickson | Republican | Lansing | Ingham County 1st District | |
| Stanley Everett | Republican | Battle Creek | Calhoun County 2nd District | |
| James S. Farnsworth | Republican | Allegan | Allegan County District | |
| Jack Faxon | Democratic | Detroit | 5th Senatorial District | |
| Charles Figy | Republican | Morenci | 19th Senatorial District | |
| Francis Finch | Republican | Mattawan | Van Buren County District | |
| Charles L. Follo | Democratic | Escanaba | Delta County District | |
| William D. Ford | Democratic | Taylor | Wayne County 13th District | |
| Paul V. Gadola Sr. | Republican | Flint | 13th Senatorial District | |
| Wynne C. Garvin | Democratic | Detroit | Wayne County 3rd District | |
| Paul G. Goebel | Republican | Grand Rapids | 16th Senatorial District | |
| William G. Gover | Republican | Sheridan | Montcalm County District | |
| William O. Greene | Democratic | Detroit | 3rd Senatorial District | |
| Rockwell T. Gust Jr. | Republican | Grosse Pointe Farms | 1st Senatorial District | |
| Donald M. Habermehl | Republican | Alpena | 29th Senatorial District | |
| William F. Hanna | Republican | Muskegon | Muskegon County 2nd District | |
| John A. Hannah | Republican | East Lansing | 14th Senatorial District | |
| Adelaide J. Hart | Democratic | Detroit | Wayne County 10th District | |
| Ervin J. Haskill | Republican | Lapeer | Lapeer County District | |
| H. V. Hatch | Republican | Marshall | Calhoun County 1st District | |
| Lillian Hatcher | Democratic | Detroit | 4th Senatorial District | |
| Bert M. Heideman | Republican | Hancock | 32nd Senatorial District | |
| Milton E. Higgs | Republican | Bay City | Bay County District | |
| Robert G. Hodges | Democratic | Detroit | Wayne County 1st District | |
| Morris W. Hood Sr. | Democratic | Detroit | Wayne County 2nd District | |
| Roy Howes | Republican | Copemish | Wexford County District | |
| T. Jefferson Hoxie | Republican | St. Louis | Gratiot County District | |
| Lewis T. Hubbs | Republican | Gladwin | 28th Senatorial District | |
| J. Edward Hutchinson | Republican | Fennville | 8th Senatorial District | Vice President |
| Arthur T. Iverson | Republican | Detroit | Wayne County 10th District | |
| Howard L. Jones | Democratic | Webberville | Ingham County 2nd District | |
| Dorothy Leonard Judd | Republican | Grand Rapids | Kent County 3rd District | |
| Dan E. Karn | Republican | Jackson | Jackson County 1st District | |
| John T. Kelsey | Democratic | Warren | Macomb County 1st District | |
| Raymond L. King | Republican | Pontiac | Oakland County 2nd District | |
| Shuford Kirk | Republican | Caro | Tuscola County District | |
| Blaque Knirk | Republican | Quincy | 9th Senatorial District | |
| Ella D. Koeze | Republican | Grand Rapids | Kent County 2nd District | |
| Ray Krolikowski | Democratic | Hamtramck | Wayne County 14th District | |
| Richard D. Kuhn | Republican | Pontiac | Oakland County 1st District | |
| J. Don Lawrence | Republican | Ypsilanti | Washtenaw County District | |
| Karl K. Leibrand | Republican | Bay City | 24th Senatorial District | |
| William J. Leppien | Republican | Saginaw | 22nd Senatorial District | |
| Edmond Lesinski | Democratic | Detroit | Wayne County 5th District | |
| Ralph A. Liberato | Democratic | Warren | 11th Senatorial District | |
| Kent T. Lundgren | Republican | Menominee | 30th Senatorial District | |
| Arthur J. Madar | Democratic | Detroit | Wayne County 1st District | |
| Paul R. Mahinske | Democratic | Detroit | Wayne County 7th District | |
| William C. Marshall | Democratic | Taylor | 21st Senatorial District | |
| John B. Martin Jr. | Republican | Grand Rapids | 17th Senatorial District | |
| Thomas R. McAllister | Republican | Bad Axe | Huron County District | |
| John E. McCauley | Democratic | Wyandotte | Wayne County 18th District | |
| Marjorie McGowan | Democratic | Detroit | Wayne County 5th District | |
| Edward A. McLogan | Republican | Flint | Genesee County 1st District | |
| Frank G. Millard | Republican | Flint | Genesee County 1st District | |
| Carl D. Mosier | Republican | Dowagiac | St. Joseph County District | |
| Raymond M. Murphy | Democratic | Detroit | Wayne County 11th District | |
| Stephen S. Nisbet | Republican | Fremont | 26th Senatorial District | President |
| Melvin Nord | Democratic | Detroit | Wayne County 6th District | |
| Harold Norris | Democratic | Detroit | Wayne County 6th District | |
| Samuel B. Ostrow | Democratic | Detroit | Wayne County 2nd District | |
| G. Keyes Page | Republican | Flint | Genesee County 1st District | |
| William P. Pellow | Democratic | Bessemer | 31st Senatorial District | |
| Frank T. Perlich | Democratic | Bessemer | Gogebic County District | |
| Clifford E. Perras Sr. | Republican | Nadeau | Menominee County District | |
| Raymond A. Plank | Republican | Ludington | Mason County District | |
| James K. Pollock | Republican | Ann Arbor | Washtenaw County 1st District | |
| Stanley M. Powell | Republican | Ionia | Ionia County District | |
| Kenneth G. Prettie | Republican | Hillsdale | Hillsdale County District | |
| Earl C. Pugsley | Republican | Hart | Newaygo County District | |
| Elmer L. Radka | Republican | Rogers City | Presque Isle County District | |
| Nick J. Rajkovich | Republican | Traverse City | Grand Traverse County District | |
| J. Burton Richards | Republican | Eau Claire | Berrien County 2nd District | |
| Leslie W. Richards | Republican | Negaunee | Marquette County District | |
| George Romney | Republican | Bloomfield Hills | 12th Senatorial District | Vice President |
| James R. Rood | Republican | Midland | Midland County District | |
| Allen F. Rush | Republican | Lake Orion | Macomb County 3rd District | |
| Joseph F. Sablich | Democratic | Caspian | Iron County District | |
| Don F. Seyferth | Republican | Muskegon | Muskegon County 1st District | |
| James M. Shackleton | Republican | Saginaw | Saginaw County 1st District | |
| John C. Shaffer | Republican | Gladwin | Arenac County District | |
| Edward K. Shanahan | Republican | Charlevoix | Charlevoix County District | |
| Thomas G. Sharpe | Republican | Howell | Shiawassee County District | |
| Julius C. Sleder | Republican | Traverse City | 27th Senatorial District | |
| Joseph M. Snyder | Democratic | St. Clair Shores | Macomb County 2nd District | |
| H. Carl Spitler | Republican | Petoskey | Emmet County District | |
| Henrik E. Stafseth | Republican | Grand Haven | Ottawa County District | |
| Frank O. Staiger Jr. | Republican | Port Huron | 34th Senatorial District | |
| Anthony Stamm | Republican | Kalamazoo | Kalamazoo County 2nd District | |
| James H. Sterrett | Republican | Detroit | Wayne County 12th District | |
| J. Harold Stevens | Republican | Detroit | Wayne County 12th District | |
| Stephen Stopczynski | Democratic | Detroit | Wayne County 7th District | |
| William G. Suzore | Democratic | Lincoln Park | Wayne County 17th District | |
| James F. Thomson | Republican | Jackson | Jackson County 2nd District | |
| Robert S. Tubbs | Republican | Grand Rapids | Kent County 1st District | |
| Herbert M. Turner | Republican | Saginaw | Saginaw County 2nd District | |
| S. Martin Tweedie III | Republican | Port Huron | St. Clair County District | |
| David F. Upton | Republican | St. Joseph | Berrien County 1st District | |
| Richard C. Van Dusen | Republican | Birmingham | Oakland County 4th District | |
| Lee Walker | Democratic | Madison Heights | Oakland County 6th District | |
| Eugene G. Wanger | Republican | Lansing | Ingham County 1st District | |
| Ink White | Republican | St. Johns | Eaton County District | |
| Anthony J. Wilkowski | Democratic | Detroit | Wayne County 9th District | |
| Claude L. Wood | Republican | Brown City | 20th Senatorial District | |
| Henry L. Woolfenden | Republican | Bloomfield Hills | Oakland County 3rd District | |
| Weldon O. Yeager | Republican | Detroit | 18th Senatorial District | |
| Coleman A. Young | Democratic | Detroit | Wayne County 9th District | |
| Charles N. Youngblood Jr. | Democratic | Detroit | Wayne County 3rd District | |

== Amendments ==
The Michigan Constitution has been amended several times since its creation.

| Subject of Amendment | Article/section | Method | Year | Action | Vote in favor | Vote opposed |
|---|---|---|---|---|---|---|
| Establish Judicial Tenure Commission | Art. VI, sec. 30 | HJR PP of 1968 | Aug. 1968 | Approved | 553,182 | 228,738 |
| Require legislature to create state officers compensation commission | Art. IV, sec. 12 | HJR AAA of 1968 | Aug. 1968 | Approved | 417,393 | 346,839 |
| Define manner of filling judicial vacancies | Art. VI, secs. 20, 22, 23, 24 | HJR F of 1968 | Aug. 1968 | Approved | 494,512 | 266,561 |
| Prohibit public aid to nonpublic schools and students | Art. VIII, sec. 2 | Initiatory Petition of 1970 | Nov. 1970 | Approved | 1,416,838 | 1,078,740 |
| Allow legislature to authorize lotteries and the sale of lottery tickets | Art. IV, sec. 41 | HJR V of 1972 | May 1972 | Approved | 1,352,768 | 506,778 |
| Allow trial by jury of less than 12 jurors in all prosecutions for misdemeanors punishable by imprisonment for not more than 1 year | Art. I, sec. 20 | HJR M of 1972 | Aug. 1972 | Approved | 696,570 | 357,186 |
| Prohibit legislators' pay increases for lawmakers unless approved by a 2/3 vote of each house of the legislature | Art. IV, sec. 12 | HJR of 2002 | Aug. 2002 | Approved | 1,057,503 | 404,682 |
| Limits eminent domain powers of local communities | Art. IV, sec. 12 | SJR E of 1972 | Nov. 2006 | Approved | 2,914,214 | 724,573 |
| Establish an independent redistricting commission | Art. IV, sec. 6 | Initiative Petition of 2017 | Nov. 2018 | Approved | 2,507,294 | 1,586,831 |

== See also ==
- Law of Michigan
