= Asahel Finch Jr. =

19th century American politician

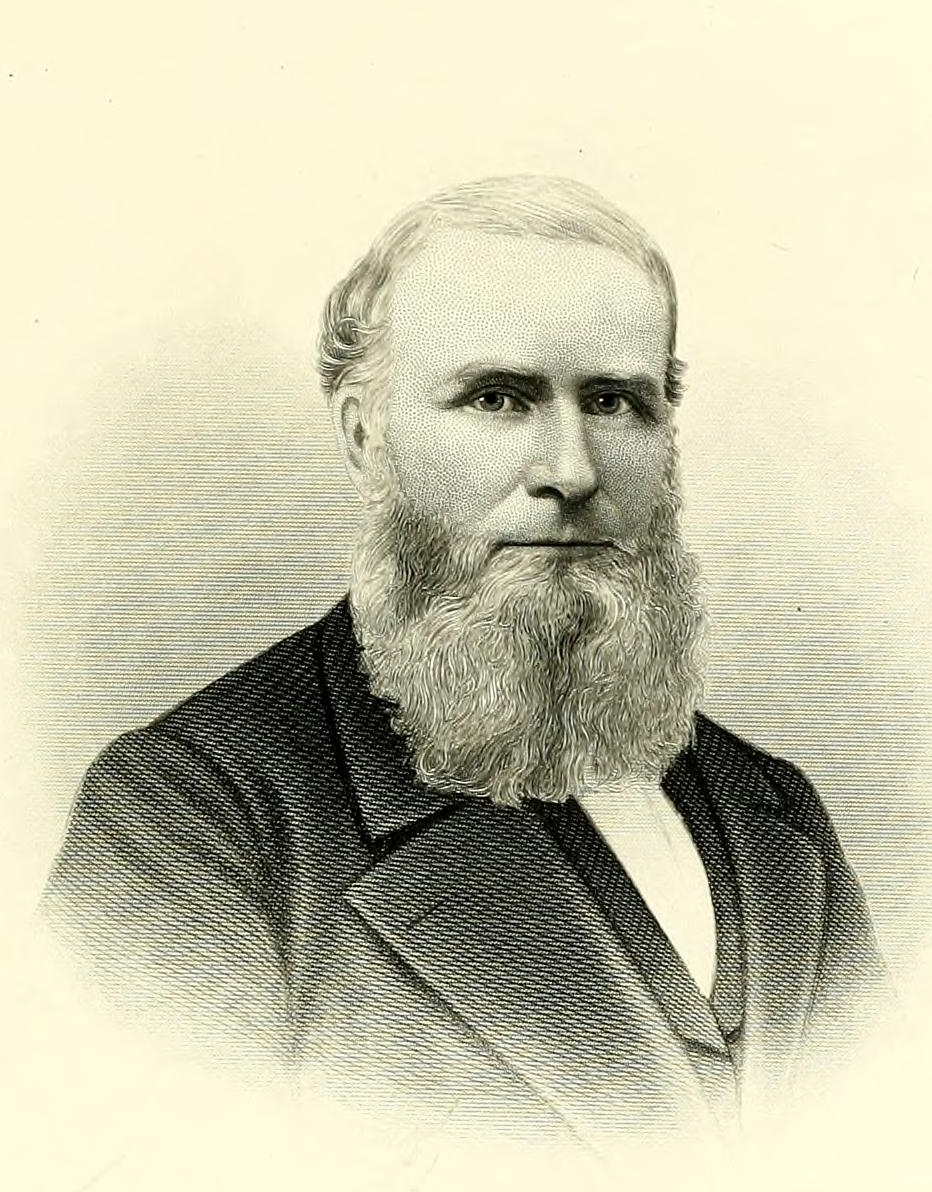
- From History of Milwaukee from its first settlement to the year 1895 (1895)

Member of the Michigan House of Representatives from the Lenawee district
- In office January 2, 1837 – Nov 17, 1837 Serving with Orange Butler, Jesse Ballard, & Alonzo Cressy
- Preceded by: Hiram Dodge, George Howe, Allen Hutchins, Darius Mead, & James Wheeler
- Succeeded by: James Field

Personal details
- Born: February 14, 1809 Genoa, New York
- Died: April 4, 1883 (aged 74) Milwaukee, Wisconsin
- Party: Republican; Whig (before 1854)
- Spouse: Mary De Forest Bristol (m. 1830)
- Profession: Lawyer

Asahel Finch Jr. (February 14, 1809 – April 4, 1883) was an American lawyer, politician, and pioneer of Michigan and Wisconsin. He was a member of the Michigan House of Representatives, representing Lenawee County during the 1837 session.

== Biography ==
Born in Genoa, New York, Asahel Finch Jr. married Mary De Forest Bristol in 1830 and they moved to Adrian, Michigan. He began studying law in 1834, and was admitted to the Michigan bar in 1838.

He served in the Michigan House of Representatives in 1837, then resigned before the end of his term, and moved to Milwaukee, Wisconsin, in 1839, where he opened a law firm (now Foley & Lardner) with William Pitt Lynde. In 1867, Finch unsuccessfully ran for Mayor of Milwaukee.

Initially a Whig, he aided in the creation of the Republican Party and supported John C. Frémont for President in 1856.

He died in Milwaukee on April 4, 1883.
