= Verona, Michigan =

Verona, Michigan may refer to:

- Verona, Calhoun County, Michigan, a former unincorporated community now incorporated in the City of Battle Creek, Michigan
- Verona, Huron County, Michigan, a current unincorporated community on the borders of Verona Township and Sigel Township in Huron County, Michigan
