= Carl Bishop =

American archeologist

Carl Whiting Bishop
- Born: July 12, 1881; Tokyo, Japan
- Died: June 16, 1942 (aged 60); Arlington, Virginia, US
- Occupation: Archaeologist

Chinese name
- Traditional Chinese: 畢安祺
- Simplified Chinese: 毕安祺
Transcriptions
Standard Mandarin
- Hanyu Pinyin: Bì Ānqí
- Wade–Giles: Pi An-ch'i

Carl Whiting Bishop (July 12, 1881 – June 16, 1942) was an American archeologist who specialized in East Asian civilizations. From 1922 to 1942 he was a curator at the Freer Gallery of Art in Washington, D.C.

At his death Bishop was praised for his ability to synthesize a wide range of evidence and present them "in ordered and highly engaging fashion", which was "the best sort of popularization of prehistory". He argued for the then popular theory of hyperdiffusionism, the theory that all civilizations originated in one place and spread to others, in this case, from the Near East to China. He was criticized, however, for going beyond the accepted evidence.

== Early years ==
Bishop was born on July 12, 1881, in Tokyo, Japan, where his parents were Methodist missionaries. He attended the English School in Tokyo from 1888 to 1897. In 1898 he entered the Northwestern Academy, Evanston, Illinois, then attended DePauw University, in Greencastle, Indiana, from 1901 to 1904; Hampden-Sydney College in Hampden-Sydney, Virginia, 1905–06; and Business College in Poughkeepsie, New York, from 1906 to 1907. Bishop developed his interest in anthropology and archaeology during 1907–12 when he traveled in the southwestern United States and Central America and was silver assayer in Mexico during the Yaqui Wars there in 1905–06. He returned to DePauw University and received his Bachelor of Arts degree in 1912 and in 1913 was awarded a Master of Arts degree by the Department of Anthropology at Columbia University.

On February 24, 1909, Bishop married Nettie E. Brooks (1893–1933) in Tarrytown, New York. The couple had six children. His second wife was Daisy Furscott Bishop (1887–1966).

== Career ==
Bishop began his professional career as a member of Harvard University's Peabody Museum Expedition to Central America in 1913. In 1914 he became Associate Curator of Oriental Art at the University of Pennsylvania Museum, and traveled to China for the first time from 1915 to 1917. He joined the United States Navy during World War I, serving in naval intelligence. From 1918 to 1920, Bishop was lieutenant, junior grade and served as assistant naval attaché in Shanghai.

He became a professor of archaeology at Columbia University in October 1921, and in April 1922, he joined the Freer Gallery of the Smithsonian Institution. He served as Associate Curator, then Curator, from 1922 until his death in 1942. The Freer appointed Bishop with a mandate to undertake archaeological research and excavation in China, where he spent nine of his twenty years with the Freer. The first expedition lasted from February 20, 1923, until August 6, 1927. The second trip to China lasted from November 16, 1929, until April 11, 1934.

The first tour was only partially successful but began optimistically. Shortly after arriving in China in 1923, Bishop responded to reports of the discovery of ancient ritual bronzes in Xinzheng (Hsin Cheng), Henan, the legendary home of the Yellow Emperor. There he met and befriended Li Ji, an American trained Chinese archeologist who had himself recently returned to China. Bishop reported to the Smithsonian that the situation in Xinzheng was "most deplorable, in that no trained investigator was present to show how the objects could be removed from their setting without injury to themselves and to note down the information brought to light in the course of the digging but now, of course, lost forever." He felt fortunate to enlist Li Ji, who he employed for the Smithsonian and provided advanced training.

Bishop negotiated with the Historical Museum in Peking to be appointed an archaeological adviser to the Chinese government. According to Bishop's plan, the Smithsonian Institution was to be the sole foreign excavator and exporter of objects, though the work was to be carried out with Chinese colleagues. Unfortunately for these plans, China at this time was in a state of reaction against foreign intrusions and a foreign archaeologist could not get permission to dig. Fighting between warlord armies made the situation worse, and even Bishop's headquarters in Peking came under gunfire or air raids. Chinese were often suspicious that Westerners had come to China to dig for artifacts to take out of the country. Li Ji left Bishop to join the Academia Sinica, where he went on to become one of the founders of Chinese modern archaeology, and he was one of the Chinese archaeologists who helped to draft laws that prohibited foreigners from conducting digs or exporting antiquities. Bishop wrote in his journal:

We had already long since learned that under conditions as they existed in China at that time, official permits alone were apt to have a negative rather than positive value. They by no means assured us of liberty to proceed with an enterprise unmolested; but without them we were certain to be hindered, blackmailed, or even stopped altogether. (Feb. 1925).

Feeling frustrated and disillusioned, Bishop left China in 1927. When he returned to China in 1929, opposition to foreign archaeology had strengthened, and foreign archaeologists could do little useful excavation. By 1934, the directors of the Freer Gallery concluded that the benefits from Bishop's expeditions did not justify the $30,000 annual expense and abandoned the program.

== Bishop as a photographer ==
Bishop's contributions to photography were also lasting. When he first arrived in China in 1915, he set out to record sites of interest in Peking, and succeeded in photographing most of them. His photographs of imperial sites now stand as almost unique parts of the documentary record. Bishop also used his spare time to photograph street life and social customs, architecture (especially historic buildings), and scenery. These photographs, which Bishop classified with his own system and annotated with extensive notes, were not put on display, but mounted in twelve notebooks, though the negatives were kept in storage at the Smithsonian. Some 4,000 of these images are included in the Carl Whiting Bishop Papers Brill Publishers microform edition.

== Advocacy of hyperdiffusionism ==
Bishop produced a series of articles presented "in ordered and highly engaging fashion", arguing for hyperdiffusionism, the theory that all civilizations originated in one place and spread to others. Among the scholars influenced by Bishop was Owen Lattimore, who was intrigued by Bishop's emphasis on geography as a shaping factor in Chinese civilization and his emphasis on field work rather than library research.

Roswell Britton, however, criticized Bishop's 1942 Handbook in the Far Eastern Quarterly for going beyond the evidence. Bishop, wrote Britton, argued that

the ingredients of progress are represented as flowing eastward into China, mostly by the steppe belt and a little (rice, chicken, metallurgy) by the southern route which coincides in part with the Burma Road. China appears an outpost of the Old World civilization, a sub-center of diffusion enlightening the Far East. There is no consideration of possible westward drift in early time, notwithstanding that cases in Han time and later are well known.

Britton added that Bishop was "not at ease in the Chinese language, and contributions of a decisive order are consequently missed..." But he concluded that "the serious student will prize this Handbook as Mr. Bishop's final work, and value his correlations of cultural milestones in the Near and Far East even though overworked unilaterally, and willingly allow for inconsistencies of individual interpretation with mentioned archaeological fact.

== Selected works ==
- —— (1921). The Elephant and Its Ivory in Ancient China. United States?: s.n.
- —— (1923). "The Historical Geography of Early Japan". Geographical Review. 13 (1): 40–63. Bibcode:1923GeoRv..13...40B. doi:10.2307/208201. JSTOR 208201.
- —— (1922). The Geographical Factor in the Development of Chinese Civilization. New York: American Geographical Society.
- —— (1924). "The Bronzes of Hsin-Cheng Hsien [Xinzheng Xian]". Chinese Social and Political Science Review. 8: 81–99.
- —— (1927). The Bronzes of Hsin-Chêng Hsien. Washington: U.S.G.P.O.
- —— (1927). The Ritual Bullfight. Washington: U.S.G.P.O.
- —— (1928). "The Find at Hsin Chêng Hsien". Artibus Asiae. 3 (2/3): 110–121. doi:10.2307/3247851. JSTOR 3247851.
- ——; Maspero, Henri (1928). The Origins of the Chinese Civilization. Washington: U.S.G.P.O.
- —— (1930). Men From the Farthest Past. Washington: Smithsonian Institution Series.
- —— (1932). "The Rise of Civilization in China with Reference to Its Geographical Aspects". Geographical Review. 22 (4): 617–631. Bibcode:1932GeoRv..22..617B. doi:10.2307/208818. JSTOR 208818.
- ——; Hrdlička, Aleš; Abbot, C. G. (1934). Man from the Farthest Past. Smithsonian Institution Series. Vol. 7. New York. hdl:2027/mdp.39015052838730. HathiTrust
- —— (1936). "A Civilization by Osmosis—Ancient China". The American Scholar. 5 (3): 323–328. JSTOR 41204220.
- —— (1938). Origin and Early Diffusion of the Traction Plow. Washington: Smithsonian Institution.
- —— (1941). The Beginnings of Civilization in Eastern Asia. Washington.
- —— (1942). Origin of the Far Eastern Civilizations: A Brief Handbook. City of Washington: Smithsonian Institution. HathiTrust.

== References and further reading ==
- Britton, Roswell S. (1943). "Reviewed work: Origin of the Far Eastern Civilizations: A Brief Handbook., Carl Whiting Bishop" (PDF). The Far Eastern Quarterly. 2 (3): 299–301. doi:10.2307/2049218. hdl:2027/mdp.39015033921928. JSTOR 2049218. S2CID 126837387.
- Brown, Clayton D. (2008). Making the Majority: Defining Han Identity in Chinese Ethnology and Archaeology (PDF). Vol. Ph.D. Dissertation Department of History. University of Pittsburgh.
- Newmeyer, Sarah L (1987). "The Carl Whiting Bishop Photographic Archive in the Freer Gallery of Art: A Resource for the Study of Chinese Architecture, Archaeology, Geology, Topography, Flora, Fauna, Customs, and Culture". Journal of East Asian Libraries. 82 (1): 23–28.
- A.G. Wenley, "Carl Whiting Bishop (1881–1942)," Notes on Far Eastern Studies in America 12 (Spring 1943), 27–32.
- Wilbur, C. Martin (1943), "In Memoriam: Carl Whiting Bishop", The Far Eastern Quarterly, 2 (2): 204–207, JSTOR 2049497
- Shavit, David (1990). The United States in Asia: A Historical Dictionary. Greenwood Publishing Group. ISBN 978-0-313-26788-8.
