= Foley & Lardner =

American law firm

Foley & Lardner LLP
- Headquarters: U.S. Bank Center; Milwaukee, Wisconsin
- No. of offices: 27
- No. of attorneys: 1,050
- No. of employees: 1,003 (2021)
- Major practice areas: General practice
- Key people: Daljit Doogal; (Chairman & CEO); Steven Vazquez; (Managing Partner)
- Revenue: ▲US$1.28 billion (2024)
- Date founded: 1842; 184 years ago
- Founder: Asahel Finch Jr.; William Pitt Lynde
- Company type: Limited liability partnership
- Website: www.foley.com

Foley & Lardner LLP (often referred to simply as "Foley") is an international law firm headquartered in Milwaukee, Wisconsin. Founded in 1842, it was ranked 45th by revenue on The American Lawyer's 2025 AmLaw 100 rankings of U.S. law firms, with $1.28 billion gross revenue in 2024.

== History ==
The oldest and largest law firm in Wisconsin, it was established in 1842 as Finch & Lynde. Its founders were Asahel Finch Jr., a Republican and former Michigan state representative, and William Pitt Lynde, a Democrat who later served in the United States House of Representatives, the Wisconsin state legislature, and as mayor of Milwaukee. By 1970 the firm was beginning to grow substantially, and in 2001, after absorbing firms in Chicago and Washington, D.C., it was the 11th-largest firm in the United States.

In 1969 the firm adopted the name Foley & Lardner LLP and launched a succession of acquisitions to become a national law firm. The name refers to two name partners, both corporate lawyers: Leon Foley and Lynford Lardner Jr. Both Leon Foley and Lynford Lardner are credited with launching the law firm's large national expansion. Foley, who acted as a strategist in the development of Aurora Health Care System, which would become Wisconsin’s largest healthcare provider, died at 83 in 1978. Lardner, who also served as the president of the United States Golf Association, died after drowning in the Milwaukee River. Lardner is survived by four grandchildren. When the firm merged with Gardere Wynne Sewell LLP in 2018, the plan (at least initially) was to use, in some cities, a firm name including the name partner name "Gardere".

In 2020, Foley & Lardner partner Cleta Mitchell aided Donald Trump in his efforts to overturn the 2020 election and pressure election officials to "find" votes for him to defeat the then Democratic Party candidate and eventual President of the United States, Joe Biden. Mitchell criticized Georgia Secretary of State Brad Raffensperger, accusing him without evidence of saying things "that are simply not correct" about the presidential results in Georgia. She also claimed without evidence that dead people voted in the election. When confronted with why a Foley & Lardner partner was involved in aiding Trump in overturning the 2020 election, Foley & Lardner distanced itself from Mitchell. On January 5, 2021, Foley & Lardner announced that Mitchell had resigned.

In 2021 Foley & Lardner opened its 25th office, in Salt Lake City, Utah. The firm opened its 26th office in Raleigh, North Carolina in 2024, and its 27th office in Nashville, Tennessee in 2025.

Foley & Lardner's primary practice areas include intellectual property, business law, litigation, and regulatory. Notable clients of the firm include Johnson Controls, CVS, Harley Davidson, Major League Baseball, and Acciona.

== Notable current and former employees ==
- William M. Conley, U.S. District Court judge for the Western District of Wisconsin, was a partner in the Madison office
- Jim Doyle, Former Governor of Wisconsin, is of counsel in the Madison office
- Bob DuPuy, former president and chief operating officer of Major League Baseball, has been a partner in the Milwaukee and New York offices
- Thomas E. Fairchild, Seventh Circuit Court of Appeals Judge and Wisconsin Supreme Court justice, was an associate in the Milwaukee office from 1945 to 1948
- Russ Feingold, Former United States Senator from Wisconsin, was an associate in the Madison office
- Brian Hagedorn, Wisconsin Supreme Court Justice, worked at the Milwaukee office
- William Isaac, Chairman of the Federal Deposit Insurance Corporation from 1981 to 1985 and current Chairman of consulting firm LECG’s Global Financial Services
- Joan F. Kessler, Wisconsin Court of Appeals Judge, was a partner in the Milwaukee office
- Scott L. Klug, Former United States Congressman from Wisconsin's 2nd congressional district, is a public affairs director in the Madison office
- Brett H. Ludwig, U.S. District Court judge for the Eastern District of Wisconsin, was a partner at the Milwaukee office
- Marcia Morales Howard, U.S. District Court judge for the Middle District of Florida, was an associate in the Jacksonville office
- Lisa S. Neubauer, Wisconsin Court of Appeals Judge and candidate for the Wisconsin Supreme Court, was a partner in the Milwaukee office
- Ulice Payne Jr., Former CEO of the Milwaukee Brewers and first African-American CEO of a Major League Baseball franchise, was a partner in the Milwaukee office
- Fred Ridley, current Chairman of Augusta National Golf Club, is a partner in the Tampa office, former national chair of the Real Estate Practice, a member of the Hospitality & Leisure (former co-chair) and Sports Industry Teams, a member of the Transactions Practice, and a former member of the firm’s Management Committee.
- Manuel Rocha, Former U.S. Ambassador to Bolivia (2000–02), is a Senior Advisor on International Business in the Miami office. Arrested on December 1, 2023 on charges of spying for Cuba.
- Cleta Mitchell, attempted to overturn the 2020 presidential election and subsequently resigned.
- Antonin Scalia, United States Supreme Court Justice, was a summer associate in the Milwaukee office
- Dennis Cardoza, Former United States Congressman from California's 18th congressional district, in a public affairs and lobbying role.
- Chris Kise.
