= Joseph Smith (Michigan politician) =

American politician

Member of the Michigan House of Representatives from the Cass County district
- In office November 2, 1835 – December 31, 1837

Personal details
- Born: April 11, 1809 Botetourt County, Virginia
- Died: April 18, 1880 (aged 71) Cassopolis, Michigan
- Party: Democratic

Joseph Smith (April 11, 1809 – April 18, 1880) was an American businessman and politician who served in the first two sessions of the Michigan House of Representatives.

== Biography ==
Joseph Smith was born in Botetourt County, Virginia, on April 11, 1809, the son of Henry Smith and Sarah Shaffer. When he was three years old, the family moved to a farm near Springfield, Ohio, and Smith received a rudimentary education. At age 18, he left home and spent two years clearing timber in nearby counties.

In 1829, having accumulated capital of $350 (equivalent to $10,582 in 2025), he built the first house in Northampton, Ohio, and opened a small store. He moved to Calvin Township, Michigan, in 1831, along with his father and brother John, and the three bought a sawmill; his father and brother soon returned to Ohio and Smith ran the mill for two years. He also ran a whiskey distillery for several years. He sold the mill in 1835 and bought 1,000 acres (400 ha) of land in Jefferson Township, Michigan, and farmed it for eighteen years, then moved into the mercantile business in 1847. In 1855 he moved the business to Cassopolis, Michigan, and was engaged in it until 1875. Smith also owned extensive property around Cassopolis. He reached the rank of captain in the Ohio militia, and was appointed major in the militia organized in Cass County in 1842, though at the only muster of the latter militia, almost all of the troops were drunk on whiskey.

Smith held various positions in local politics, including township supervisor, justice of the peace, and president of Cassopolis, and was a delegate to the Second Convention of Assent held in Ann Arbor to approve the terms Congress had offered for Michigan's statehood. He was elected as a Democrat to the first session of the Michigan House of Representatives after the state constitution was adopted in 1835, and re-elected in 1837.

He died in Cassopolis on April 18, 1880, a few weeks after suffering a fall on an icy step.

=== Family ===
Smith married Jemima "Jennie" Lippincott, of Clark County, Ohio, on February 25, 1830. They had two children who died in infancy and nine who survived to adulthood: Lewis Davis, Eliza J., John Henry, Emily, Margaret, Sarah, Thomas J., Sabrina, and James P.

== Sources ==
- Bingham, Stephen D. (1888), Early History of Michigan: With Biographies of State Officers, Members of Congress, Judges and Legislators, Lansing: Thorp & Godfrey
- Mathews, Alfred (1971) [1882], History of Cass County, Michigan, Evansville, Indiana: Unigraphic
- Pioneer Society of the State of Michigan (1883), Pioneer Collections: Report of the Pioneer Society of the State of Michigan, vol. 4, Lansing, Michigan: W. S. George & Co.
