= Francis Charter =

American politician

Member of the Michigan House of Representatives from the Monroe County district
- In office November 2, 1835 – January 1, 1837
- In office January 1, 1838 – January 5, 1839

Francis Charter was an American politician who served two terms in the Michigan House of Representatives.

== Biography ==
Francis Charter was elected supervisor of LaSalle Township, Michigan, in 1830 and each succeeding year through 1835. He was elected to the Michigan House of Representatives as a representative from Monroe County and served in the 1st Michigan Legislature from 1835 through 1836, and was re-elected to a term in 1838.
