= Isaac Monfore =

American politician (1803–1871)

Member of the Michigan House of Representatives from the Macomb County district
- In office November 2, 1835 – December 31, 1837

Personal details
- Born: September 14, 1803 Delaware County, New York, US
- Died: April 28, 1871 (aged 67) Disco, Michigan, US
- Party: Democratic

Isaac Monfore or Monfort (September 14, 1803 – April 28, 1871) was an American politician who served two terms in the Michigan House of Representatives in Michigan's first years of statehood.

== Biography ==
Isaac Monfore was born in Delaware County, New York, on September 14, 1803, the son of Peter Monfore and Olive Conerkoven. His father was a veteran of the American Revolutionary War. He went to high school in Rochester, New York, and was a teacher for several years.

Monfore purchased 160 acres (65 ha) of land in Ray, Michigan Territory in 1828, then returned to Rush, New York, and returned in 1831 to buy another 160 acres in Shelby, Michigan, also in Macomb County, which eventually grew to 500 acres (200 ha). He studied law and was a justice, county clerk, and supervisor. He was elected as a Democrat to the Michigan House of Representatives in the first election under the state's new constitution in 1835, and served through 1837. He was one of four representatives who opposed the loosening of banking laws that led to the establishment of wildcat banking in Michigan.

Monfore was one of the first teachers in Michigan Territory. He was one of three landowners to donate land for a local school; when it was renamed and incorporated as the Disco Academy in 1855, Monfore was its secretary, and later taught there as well.

He died on April 28, 1871, at his home in Disco, Michigan, and is buried in Curtis Cemetery in Shelby Township.

=== Family ===
Monfore married Mary D. Curtis, of Shelby, on July 15, 1836. They had five children: Milton J., Franklin P., Mary A., Isaac N., and Ann J.
