= Alexander Tackels =

American politician (c.1791–1855)

Member of the Michigan House of Representatives from the Macomb County district
- In office November 2, 1835 – January 1, 1837
- In office January 7, 1839 – January 5, 1840

Personal details
- Born: c. 1791
- Died: April 12, 1855 (aged 63)
- Party: Democratic

Alexander Tackels, also Tackles or Tacles, (c. 1791 – April 12, 1855) was an American politician who served two terms in the Michigan House of Representatives.

== Biography ==
Alexander Tackels moved to Romeo, Michigan, in 1822, where he was a farmer. By 1823, he was a widower. He was elected a commissioner of Washington Township, Michigan, in 1827, and served as a justice of the peace in 1832, 1836, and 1838. He was supervisor of Ray Township, Michigan, from 1842 to 1843, and was elected as an associate judge for Macomb County in 1844.

He was elected as a Democrat to the Michigan House of Representatives in 1835 and served through 1836, and was elected again for a term in 1839.

He died on April 12, 1855, and is buried in Walled Lake Cemetery in Walled Lake, Michigan.Enders-Jardine 2010

=== Family ===
Tackels and Polly Chandler had a son, Charles Tackels, who was born on November 22, 1827, and was later elected treasurer of Macomb County. Tackels married Susannah Thompson, the widow of Nathaniel Thompson, on February 11, 1841, when he was 50 years old.
