= Hiram Higley =

American politician (1804–1860)

Member of the Michigan House of Representatives from the Oakland County district
- In office November 2, 1835 – January 1, 1837

Personal details
- Born: March 5, 1804 East Windsor, Connecticut
- Died: January 8, 1860 (aged 55) Leipsic, Ohio
- Party: Democratic

Hiram Higley (March 5, 1804 – January 8, 1860) was an American politician who served one term in the Michigan House of Representatives in its first session after being established.

== Biography ==
Hiram Higley was born in East Windsor, Connecticut, on March 5, 1804, the son of Adori Higley and Clarissa Loomis. He was a tanner by occupation. He settled in Rochester, Michigan Territory in 1827, and was elected as a Democrat to the Michigan House of Representatives in 1835 following adoption of the state's first constitution.

In 1853, he moved to Leipsic, Ohio, and died there on January 8, 1860.
