= Joseph Jackson (Michigan politician) =

American politician

Member of the Michigan House of Representatives from the Monroe County district
- In office November 2, 1835 – January 1, 1837

Personal details
- Born: October 4, 1793 Minisink, New York
- Died: May 27, 1888 (aged 94) Wapello, Iowa
- Party: Democratic

Joseph Jackson (October 4, 1793 – May 27, 1888) was an American politician who served one term in the Michigan House of Representatives.

== Biography ==
Joseph Jackson was born October 4, 1793, in Minisink, New York, the son of James Alexander Jackson and Martha Drake. When he was a few years old, his family moved to the area of present-day Rochester, New York, which at the time consisted of a single log house. Jackson served in the War of 1812, fought under Major General Jacob Brown at the Battle of Lundy's Lane, and settled in Cayuga County, New York, following the war. He went into the mercantile business in Alleghany County, New York, and then moved to Rochester for seven years before moving to Michigan.

Jackson, a Democrat, was elected in 1835 to the Michigan House of Representatives in the first election following adoption of the state's constitution, and he served one term.

Jackson moved to Lake County, Indiana, in 1837, locating a claim there with his son Clinton that spring, and moving his family from Monroe County in October 1837. Jackson opened the first store in the area. In October 1846, he moved his family to Crown Point, Indiana, where Jackson served as county auditor and ran a hotel named the Hack House with his son-in-law, Z. P. Farley.

Jackson moved to Wapello, Iowa, in 1857, and served as justice of the peace. He died at home on May 27, 1888, and is buried in Wapello.

=== Family ===
Jackson was married in Scipio, New York, on December 14, 1815, to Amarilla Durkee of Scipio. They had five children: Ursula Ann, who died as an infant, Clinton, Amarilla Valeria, Helen Augusta, and another daughter named Ursula Ann who became the teacher of the first school in West Creek Township, Indiana, in 1838. Amarilla Jackson died on December 3, 1885.
