= Verona, Calhoun County, Michigan =

Verona, Michigan was a town then in Emmett Township which was an early rival for commercial dominance of the area with Battle Creek. Battle Creek eventually became the dominant city and the area that was once Verona has since been annexed into the city of Battle Creek. Verona had a school as early as 1852.

Verona was founded in 1835 by Ezra Convis. By 1837 it has a population about equal to that of Battle Creek. There was a saw mill, a grist mill, 2 dry goods store and a tavern.
