= Disco, Michigan =

- Unincorporated community
- Location within the state of Michigan
- Coordinates: 42°41′02″N 83°02′04″W
- Country: United States
- State: Michigan
- County: Macomb
- Township: Shelby
- Platted: 1849
- Time zone: UTC-5 (Eastern (EST))
  - Summer (DST): UTC-4 (EDT)
- ZIP code(s): 48316
- GNIS feature ID: 624694

Disco, Michigan was a village in what is now Shelby Charter Township, Michigan.

Disco was located at the intersection of Whiskey Road (now 24 Mile Road) and Van Dyke Road. It was platted in 1849. It was first populated by European settlers, mainly from New York State around 1830. Their homesteads were near the common corner of sections 9, 10, 15 and 16 of Shelby Township, then referred to as the "Utica Plains" vicinity. The offices and township hall of the Charter Township of Shelby are now located in the Southeast quadrant of this same roadway intersection, where the village once stood.

Disco got its name from two possible origins: from the Latin word "Discare", meaning 'to learn'; or as a contraction of District of Columbia.

Disco never incorporated, although the local high school, the "Disco Academy" gained some recognition and a post office named Disco operated from May 5, 1854, until July 31, 1906.

Disco had two general stores, wagon shops, blacksmith shops, a harness shop, a paint shop, and a hotel named The Halfway House - as the village was at the midpoint of the Concord Coach Line running between Royal Oak, Michigan and Almont, Michigan. Industries included a feed mill, cider mill, wooden bowl mill, and a planing mill.

The Disco Methodist Church was established by Orestes Millerd, who settled in the area around 1827. The Mennonite Church, built in the late 1890s, was used as a house of worship until the early 1930s. In 1988 the building was moved, and reconstructed into a home near its original site.

Today, only a small number of old homes and a namesake location on county road maps are all that remain of this early Shelby Township historic village.
See also: "The Lost Village of Disco" on the Shelby Township Historical Society website.
