= Isaac J. Ullman =

American politician

Member of the Michigan House of Representatives from the St. Joseph County district
- In office November 2, 1835 – January 1, 1837

Personal details
- Born: March 29, 1798 Frankfurt or Strasbourg
- Died: November 7, 1866 (aged 68) Racine, Wisconsin
- Party: Democratic

Isaac James Ullman, or Ullmann, (March 29, 1798 – November 7, 1866) was an American businessman and politician who served one term in the Michigan House of Representatives. He was a founder of Racine College in Wisconsin.

== Biography ==
Isaac Ullman was born on March 29, 1798, in either Frankfurt or Strasbourg, France. He emigrated to the United States, likely in either 1817 or 1822, settled in Watertown, New York, and in 1827 became a United States citizen.

Ullman ran a hotel called the Mansion House in Detroit in 1829. He was an early settler of St. Joseph County, Michigan, and ran a hotel in the village of Sturgis for a period of time, before selling his interest in the village to Andrew Backus in 1833. In 1831, he was appointed quartermaster of the 3rd Brigade of the Michigan militia. Ullman was a staunch Democrat, was elected to the Michigan House of Representatives in the first election under the state's new constitution in 1835, and served one term.

By 1837, Ullman was operating a general store in Constantine, Michigan. In July 1836, during the era of wildcat banking in Michigan, the Bank of Constantine was chartered, with Ullman as a member of the board of directors. He was its president pro tem in 1838, but it closed its doors in 1841.

Ullman later moved to Wisconsin. He served as a school commissioner in Racine, Wisconsin, and was one of the founders of Racine College in 1852.

Ullman died in Racine on November 7, 1866.

=== Family ===
Ullman married Delia Maria Johnson. They had at least three children: Emilie Mack, Henry Johnson, and Frederic, born in Racine. Emilie married Wisconsin lawyer and politician Marshall Strong. Frederic served in the Civil War and became an attorney in Chicago.

The Ullmans built a house in Racine at 731 S. Main St in 1843, and lived there until 1886.
