= James W. Hill =

American politician

Member of the Michigan House of Representatives from the Washtenaw County district
- In office November 2, 1835 – January 1, 1837

Personal details
- Born: c. 1791 Rhode Island
- Died: 1864 Clinton, Michigan
- Party: Democratic

James W. Hill (c. 1791 – 1864) was an American farmer, lawyer, and politician. He served in the first session of the Michigan House of Representatives.

== Biography ==
James Hill was born in Rhode Island in about 1791. By 1820, he was living in Grafton, New York, and by 1830 in Orangeville, New York.

Hill was the first settler in what is now Freedom Township in Washtenaw County, Michigan, when he moved there in June 1831 and built the first house and barn and planted the first wheat field in the area.

In 1835, Hill was elected as a Democrat to the first session of the Michigan House of Representatives following the adoption of the state's constitution.

He taught school for several years and was a director of Miller's Bank of Washtenaw. He transferred operation of the farm to his son Hanson in 1844 and moved to Manchester, Michigan, where he practiced law. He sold his farm in 1855 and moved to Prescott, Wisconsin, but returned to Lenawee County, Michigan by 1864. He died there, in Clinton, in 1864.

=== Family ===
Hill had a wife named Esther, and the couple at least three sons and four daughters; among the sons were two named Hanson and Lodmua.
