= Hiram Alden =

American politician

Member of the Michigan House of Representatives from the Branch County district
- In office November 2, 1835 – December 31, 1837

Personal details
- Born: October 28, 1792 Ashfield, Massachusetts
- Died: November 26, 1838 (aged 46) Detroit, Michigan
- Party: Democratic
- Spouse: Melita Huntley
- Children: 11

Hiram Alden (October 28, 1792 – November 26, 1838) was an American medical doctor and politician. He served two terms in the Michigan House of Representatives just after Michigan gained statehood, and was speaker pro tempore.

== Biography ==
Hiram Alden was born in Ashfield, Massachusetts, on October 28, 1792. He was the son of Isaac Alden and Irene Smith, and a direct descendant of Mayflower crew member John Alden and Priscilla Mullins. His father may have been a magistrate in Ashfield, but in 1794 the family moved to the small settlement of Western, New York, in Oneida County. In 1800, they moved to Williamstown, New York. While taking a cargo of lumber down the St. Lawrence River in 1811, his father was captured by the British, just before the start of the War of 1812, and after refusing to swear allegiance, he was deported to England and did not return until 1820, dying two years later.

Alden studied medicine with his brother-in-law, Joel Rathbun, in Camden, New York, and completed his studies in Cincinnati. He began practicing medicine in Ashville, New York. In 1828, Alden moved his practice to Ripley, New York, and then to Coldwater, Michigan, in 1834.

He was elected as a Democrat to the Michigan House of Representatives in its first session after adoption of the state's constitution in 1835, and re-elected in 1837 for a second term, during which he served as speaker pro tempore. He was also president of the village of Coldwater in 1837. He proposed the name for Quincy Township, after the residents' initial choice of either Springville or Springfield was already taken by another town.

Governor Stevens T. Mason appointed him railroad commissioner in 1838, during the construction of a railway from Detroit to Pontiac, Michigan.

He died in Detroit on November 26, 1838.

=== Family ===
Alden married Melita Huntley of Rome, New York, on January 28, 1816. They had one child, Maria, who died in infancy, and ten others who survived to adulthood: Matilda, Hiram Rathbun, Maria, Irene, Eliza Mary, Alma, Isaac Reuben, Philander, Wyllis, Elizabeth, and Harriet.
