= Elias Bradshaw =

American politician

Member of the Michigan House of Representatives from the Wayne County district
- In office 1835–1836
- Preceded by: Position established

Personal details
- Born: Canada
- Party: Democratic

Elias Bradshaw was a Michigan politician.

== Early life ==
Bradshaw was born in Canada on an unknown date. During his time in Canada, he refused to fight in the War of 1812, and as punishment was imprisoned as an American sympathizer. After this, he moved to Michigan on an unknown date before 1831.

== Political career ==
In 1835, Bradshaw was sworn in as a member of the Michigan House of Representatives from the Wayne County district as a Democratic. He serve in this position until 1836. In 1837, Bradshaw was a county surveyor. When he left this position in 1841, he became an associate judge.
