= George Brownell =

American politician

Member of the Michigan House of Representatives from the Oakland County district
- In office November 2, 1835 – January 1, 1837

Personal details
- Born: May 19, 1802 New Lisbon, New York
- Died: August 15, 1879 (aged 77) Utica, Michigan
- Party: Democratic

George Brownell (May 19, 1802 – August 15, 1879) was an American politician who served one term in the Michigan House of Representatives immediately after adoption of the state's first constitution.

== Biography ==
George Brownell was born in New Lisbon, New York, on May 19, 1802, the son of shoemaker John Brownell and Polly Crofoot. John Brownell's father had fought in the Continental Army during the American Revolutionary War. He was killed by the British, who also burned the family home in Danbury, Connecticut, sending John along with his twin brother Elijah and mother into hiding. John moved George and the rest of his family to a farm in East Bloomfield, New York, in 1814, and George spent summers working on the farm and went to school in the winter.

Brownell went to Detroit, Michigan, in 1824 and, finding property too expensive, purchased a property in Farmington Township, Michigan instead. He returned to New York to get married and moved his family to Michigan in 1825, when he built a cabin on the property in Farmington. His brother John followed him to Farmington the following year, and his father John Sr. the year after that. He served as a captain in the Oakland County Rifle Battalion during the Toledo War. He was a postmaster for many years and was appointed a justice of the peace in 1833. He held the post for over 40 years. Brownell was elected as a Democrat to the Michigan House of Representatives in 1835 and served through 1836. He served as an Oakland County commissioner from 1839 to 1840.

In 1856, he moved to Utica, Michigan, and was postmaster there from 1859 to 1861. He died in Utica on August 15, 1879.

=== Family ===
Brownell married Clarissa Grant in East Bloomfield, New York, on January 23, 1825. They had five children: Charles Grant, Elijah Thomas, William, Elizabeth Mary, and Seymour. Clarissa Brownell died on September 17, 1855, while visiting her brother in Livonia, New York. Brownell remarried, to Mary Inman Odle, on November 28, 1859, and they had three more children: Willis G., Anna May, and Elizabeth Melissa.
