= Henry A. Levake =

American politician

Member of the Michigan House of Representatives from the Chippewa County district
- In office November 2, 1835 – January 5, 1840

Personal details
- Born: c. 1793 Bolton, Vermont
- Died: c. 1839 Sault Ste. Marie, Michigan

Henry A. Levake (c. 1793 – c. 1839) was an American fur trader and politician. He served in the first four sessions of the Michigan House of Representatives.

== Biography ==
Henry Levake was born around 1793 in Bolton, Vermont, the son of Augustus Levesque (or Levake) and Lucy Clark. His father was born in Quebec but had joined the Continental Army at the beginning of the American Revolutionary War when Moses Hazen was recruiting Canadian residents, and as a result had been both excommunicated by the Catholic Church and labeled a traitor by the British, under threat of execution if he returned to Canada. Since he was unable to return home, he had settled in Bolton after the war and opened a hotel.

Henry Levake served in the War of 1812 and then, having secured a fur trading license, moved to Michigan. Exact dates of his movements are not known, but in 1820 he was engaged in business in Michilimackinac County. In the fall of 1822 he acquired a license from the U.S. Indian agent for the area, Henry Schoolcraft, to trade with the Native Americans in the area. He also served as an interpreter for Schoolcraft and his agency, and records indicate that in this capacity he helped supply Native Americans with whiskey, in contravention of the trading rules. He operated a trading post on Grand Island, Michigan, for several years, though probably not past 1828, and had accounts with the American Fur Company store in Sault Ste. Marie, Michigan, and a sutler at Fort Brady named John Hulbert. By 1827 he had established a permanent residence in Sault Ste. Marie, Michigan.

He served in a variety of official posts in Michilimackinac County in the 1820s, and served as a witness to treaties the United States signed in 1826 and 1836 with the Chippewa and Ottawa nations. He served for the first four terms of the Michigan House of Representatives.

Levake died around 1839 in Sault Ste. Marie.

=== Family ===
Scholars believe Levake had a relationship of some kind with a Native American woman, which was a common practice among traders trying to improve their business connections. The treaty of 1826 included provisions for land to be given to "half-breeds" and the Native American families of various traders, including one section to a Fanny Levake and all of her children; Fanny's mother is listed as Meeshwanqua. The 1836 treaty granted two sections to the Native American families of various people including Levake.

In 1837, Levake married Martha Davenport, leading scholars to believe he had ended his previous relationship.
