= John S. Heath =

American politician

Member of the Michigan House of Representatives from the St. Clair County district
- In office November 2, 1835 – December 31, 1837

Personal details
- Born: 1807 Hillsborough, New Hampshire
- Died: 1849 (aged 41–42) drowned in Lake Huron

John S. Heath (1807–1849) was an American medical doctor and politician who served two terms in the Michigan House of Representatives.

== Biography ==
John Heath was born in Hillsborough, New Hampshire, in 1807, the son of blacksmith Sargent Heath. He was a schoolmate of President Franklin Pierce, and went on to study medicine in Glens Falls, New York. He moved to St. Clair, Michigan, with his father in 1833, and from 1835 to 1836, he co-edited the St. Clair Republican. In 1836, he moved from St. Clair to Port Huron, Michigan, and he also owned mills and manufactured lumber at Pointe Aux Barques. He married Marilda James, daughter of pioneer Horatio James.

Heath was elected to the Michigan House of Representatives in the first election under the state's new constitution in 1835, and re-elected to a second term. He served as justice of the peace in 1839, as postmaster of Port Huron, as collector of customs, and as sheriff of St. Clair County in 1843 and 1844. In 1841 he began teaching at the first district school in Port Huron. He served as a supervisor of Port Huron Township in 1842, and was appointed a commissioner of the Detroit & Port Huron Plank Road Company in March 1844.

Heath drowned while returning in a small boat from his mills to Port Huron in March 1849. The boat was later found washed ashore 10 to 12 miles up the coast from Lexington, Michigan, with one of its masts missing. Two of Heath's employees and Peter Shook, the lighthouse keeper at Pointe Aux Barques, on his way to Detroit for supplies, also drowned.
