= Horace A. Noyes =

American politician

Member of the Michigan House of Representatives from the Wayne County district
- In office November 2, 1835 – January 1, 1837

Personal details
- Born: February 20, 1810 Preston, New York
- Died: April 19, 1877 (aged 67)
- Party: Democratic

Horace A. Noyes (February 20, 1810 – April 19, 1877) was an American lawyer and politician who served in the Michigan House of Representatives in its first session after adoption of the state constitution.

== Biography ==
Horace Noyes was born in Preston, New York, on February 20, 1810, the son of Nathan Noyes and Susannah Riddell. His father was a Baptist minister who helped organize several churches in New York and Michigan. Noyes began teaching at age fifteen, agreeing to pay his father half of his salary. The family moved to Perrington, New York, where Noyes studied law. He was admitted to the bar in Rochester in 1833, the same year that he and his family migrated to Michigan.

He moved to Plymouth, Michigan, and practiced law there until 1840. Noyes was a delegate to both the First and Second Conventions of Assent that first rejected, then accepted, the deal offered by the U.S. Congress for Michigan to accept the western part of the Upper Peninsula in exchange for the Toledo Strip in order to resolve the Toledo War and clear the way for statehood.

He was elected as a Democrat to the Michigan House of Representatives in 1835 and served through 1836. In 1840, he moved to Marshall, Michigan, and in 1844 was elected a probate judge in Calhoun County, a position which he held for 12 years before resuming his law practice in 1857.

Noyes was elected supervisor of Plymouth Township, Michigan, in 1836, as well as justice of the peace of school inspector. He served as justice again in 1840, and township clerk in 1841.

He retired from his law practice due to ill health on January 1, 1877, leaving it to his partner William H. Porter. He died on April 19, 1877, and is buried in Oakridge Cemetery in Marshall.

=== Family ===
Noyes married Mary Shutts on October 15, 1835, and they had six children who lived to maturity, Angeline, Bina S., Frances G., Avery H., Hattie, and Joseph Sibley, along with three who died while young. His youngest son, Joseph Sibley Noyes, became a prominent jurist in Southern California.
