= Peter Van Every =

American politician (1795–1859)

Member of the Michigan House of Representatives from the Wayne County district
- In office November 2, 1835 – January 1, 1837

Personal details
- Born: January 3, 1795 near Hamilton, Ontario, Canada
- Died: December 20, 1859 (aged 64)
- Party: Democratic (until 1837); Whig; Republican

Peter Van Every (January 3, 1795 – December 20, 1859) was an American farmer, merchant, and politician who served in the Michigan House of Representatives in the first years of Michigan's statehood.

== Biography ==
Peter Van Every was born near Hamilton, Ontario, Canada, on January 3, 1795. His parents moved the family to what later became Michigan Territory when he was an infant. He served as a private during the War of 1812, and was promoted to the position of quartermaster of a regiment. He was present when General William Hull surrendered Detroit to the British. Following the war, Territorial Governor Lewis Cass commissioned him as a colonel in the militia.

Van Every lived on a 400-acre (160 ha) farm in Hamtramck, Michigan, where he engaged in the meat and hotel business. He served for several years on the Michigan Territorial Council. He was a delegate to Michigan's first state constitutional convention in 1835, and was elected to the Michigan House of Representatives and served during its first session. He was a Democrat until 1837, when he switched parties and became first a Whig and later a Republican.

In 1837, Van Every exchanged his Detroit property for land near Franklin, Michigan, the owner of which had been forced to give it up due to financial failures. On his tract of 1,500 acres (610 ha), he farmed, built a grist mill, and carried on mercantile trade. The grist mill for two years was the only one in Oakland County where farmers could sell their wheat. He also built a distillery in 1837, and a potashery the next year.

Van Every died on December 20, 1859.

=== Family ===
Van Every was married to Amy Deer, and they had 15 children: Peter, Polly, William, Martha, James, Andrew J., Susan, Amy, John, George, Louisa, Lavinia, Walter, and one who died as an infant.
