= Rufus Matthews =

American politician

Member of the Michigan House of Representatives from the Washtenaw County district
- In office November 2, 1835 – January 1, 1837

Personal details
- Born: October 10, 1791 Watertown, Connecticut
- Died: November 17, 1869 (aged 78) Ann Arbor, Michigan
- Party: Democratic

Rufus Matthews (October 10, 1791 – November 17, 1869), also spelled Mathews, was an American politician who served one term in the Michigan House of Representatives.

== Biography ==
Rufus Matthews was born in Watertown, Connecticut on October 10, 1791, the son of William Matthews and Charity Kimberly. He grew up in western New York, working as a carpenter and joiner.

He moved to Michigan in 1831 and settled in Northfield Township, where he was a farmer. He was elected as a Democrat to the Michigan House of Representatives in the first election under the state constitution. He also served as supervisor of Northfield Township from 1835 to 1836, 1842 to 1843, in 1845, and from 1850 to 1852, and as justice of the peace from 1837 to 1840.

Matthews died in Ann Arbor, Michigan, on November 17, 1869.
