= Ammon Brown =

American politician

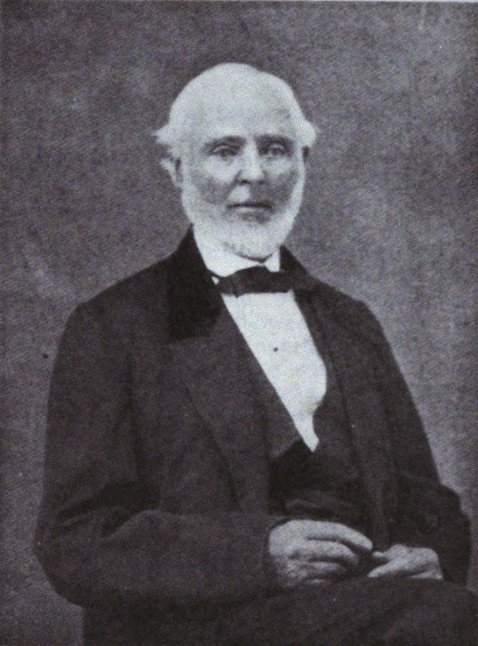

Member of the Michigan House of Representatives from the Wayne County district
- In office November 2, 1835 – December 31, 1837

Personal details
- Born: January 15, 1798 Dutchess County, New York
- Died: May 19, 1882 (aged 84) Wayne, Michigan
- Party: Democratic

Ammon Brown (January 15, 1798 – May 19, 1882) was an American politician who served two terms in the Michigan House of Representatives. He was also instrumental in forming the Wayne County, Michigan, poorhouse and asylum later known as Eloise, and served as its first keeper.

== Biography ==
Ammon Brown was born in Dutchess County, New York, on January 15, 1798. He moved to Wayne County, New York, and then to Wayne County, Michigan, in 1824, where he settled in Nankin Township. He was originally a teacher, but took up farming in Michigan.

Brown was a Democrat, and was a delegate to the state's first constitutional convention in 1835 as well as the first convention of assent that rejected the terms of statehood proposed by the United States Congress. He served in the Michigan House of Representatives from 1835 to 1837, and was again a delegate to the state constitutional convention of 1850. He was elected auditor of Wayne County in 1847 and served for four years.

Brown was supervisor of Nankin Township from 1835 to 1837 and again in 1843 and from 1847 to 1849. In 1838, as the county's superintendent of the poor, he was instrumental in moving the county poorhouse from its derelict building near Detroit to a location in Nankin Township, which later became known as Eloise. He served as the asylum's first keeper, though he did not live on the premises. He moved to the village of Wayne, Michigan, in 1854, was its first treasurer after it was officially organized in 1869, and served as its president in 1870.

Brown died in Wayne on May 19, 1882.
