= Alanson Crossman =

American blacksmith and politician

Member of the Michigan House of Representatives from the Washtenaw County district
- In office November 2, 1835 – December 31, 1837

Personal details
- Born: St. Johnsbury, Vermont
- Died: 1853
- Party: Democratic

Alanson Crossman (unknown – 1853) was an American blacksmith and politician who served in the first two sessions of the Michigan House of Representatives.

== Biography ==
Alanson Crossman was born in St. Johnsbury, Vermont, and was educated in Montpelier, Vermont.

He left St. Johnsbury on October 3, 1831, in the company of Henry Little and his family; the party arrived in Galesburg, Michigan, that November 5. Crossman settled in the town of Dexter, working as a blacksmith.

He was elected as a Democrat to the Michigan House of Representatives for its first session after the adoption of the state constitution in 1835, and re-elected to another term in 1835.

He died in 1853.

=== Family ===
Crossman married Evelina Bailey Ewen, and they had at least one daughter, Jerusha Phelps Crossman.
