= John Ellenwood =

American politician

Member of the Michigan House of Representatives from the Oakland County district
- In office November 2, 1835 – January 1, 1837

Personal details
- Born: September 15, 1777 Amherst, New Hampshire
- Died: May 9, 1856 (aged 78) West Bloomfield, Michigan
- Party: Democratic

John Ellenwood (September 15, 1777 – May 9, 1856) was an American politician who served one term in the Michigan House of Representatives immediately after its establishment by the state's first constitution.

== Biography ==
John Ellenwood was born in Amherst, New Hampshire, on September 15, 1777, the son of Ebenezer Ellenwood and Elizabeth Seaton. He worked as a surveyor, served as town clerk in Amherst from 1812 to 1814, then moved to Ridgeway, New York, in 1816.

He moved to West Bloomfield, Michigan, in 1823, and again worked as a surveyor, helping to lay out most of the roads that were laid out in the county at the time. He was appointed a justice of the peace in 1827 and held that position his entire life. He was a delegate to the state's first constitutional convention in 1835, and was elected as a Democrat to the Michigan House of Representatives following the constitution's adoption. He also served as postmaster from 1831 to 1856, and as a supervisor for nine years.

He died at home on the family farm on May 9, 1856.

=== Family ===
Ellenwood married Jane Stanley on June 23, 1799. They had five children: Calvin, Eben, Jane Seaton, Ismenia Stanley, and John Morris. Jane Ellenwood died on April 1, 1864.
