= Lewis T. Miller =

American politician

Member of the Michigan House of Representatives from the Hillsdale County district
- In office November 2, 1835 – January 1, 1837

Personal details
- Born: June 11, 1787 Rensselaer County, New York
- Died: February 14, 1856 (aged 68)
- Party: Democratic

Lewis Titus Miller (June 11, 1787 – February 14, 1856) was an American politician who served one term in the Michigan House of Representatives immediately after adoption of the state's first constitution. He was an uncle by marriage of U.S. Secretary of State William H. Seward.

== Biography ==
Lewis Miller was born in Rensselaer County, New York, on June 11, 1787, the son of Josiah Miller and Paulina Titus, and the brother of Elijah Miller, whose daughter Frances married William H. Seward. He was a farmer by occupation.

In 1833, Miller was living in Clinton, Michigan, but wrote to his niece that he was planning to move further west. He moved to Moscow, Michigan, that year, where he was the first postmaster. Hillsdale County, Michigan, was formed on February 11, 1835, by detaching the former area of Vance Township from Lenawee County. Miller was named an associate judge of the new county. He was a delegate to the state's constitutional convention in 1835, and was elected as a Democrat to the Michigan House of Representatives that fall, where he served one term.

He died on February 14, 1856.

=== Family ===
Miller married Mary Delavan in 1816. They had three children: Tompkins Delavan, Lazette Maria, and William Henry Miller. Mary Miller died in 1837, and he remarried, to Emily Richardson.
