= James J. Godfroy =

American politician

Member of the Michigan House of Representatives from the Monroe County district
- In office November 2, 1835 – January 1, 1837

Personal details
- Born: c. 1802 Detroit, Michigan Territory
- Died: May 20, 1847 (aged 45) Monroe, Michigan
- Party: Democratic

James J. Godfroy (c. 1802 – May 20, 1847) was an American politician who served one term in the Michigan House of Representatives.

== Biography ==
James Godfroy was born in Detroit, Michigan Territory in about 1802. He was educated in Bardstown, Kentucky, and studied law. He moved to Monroe, Michigan Territory soon afterwards.

Ill health forced Godfroy to abandon his law practice at an early age, and he became formed the firm P. & J.J. Godfroy with his brother Peter, and engaged in the Indian trade. He spoke English and French as well as the dialect of the area's Native American tribes, and was elected as a chief by the Pottawatomie. He exercised influence in the affairs of Monroe County residents of French descent, many of whom were illiterate. Many of them sought his advice on negotiations and real estate transactions, and also went to him for election ballots to ensure they were voting a straight Democratic ticket. He was elected to the Michigan House of Representatives in the first election after adoption of the state constitution, and served one term, through 1836.

Godfroy died in Monroe on May 20, 1847, aged 45.

=== Family ===
He married Victoria Navarre, the daughter of Colonel Francis Navarre. They had eleven children: John, Lewis C., Frederick C., Theo S., Hillary, Philip W., Augusta F., Celestine, Alexandria, Victoria R., and Mary Therese.
