= James O'Dell =

American politician (1779–1845)

Member of the Michigan House of Representatives from the Cass County district
- In office November 2, 1835 – January 1, 1837
- In office January 1, 1838 – January 6, 1839

Personal details
- Born: July 20, 1779 Berkeley County, Virginia
- Died: August 23, 1845 (aged 66) Vandalia, Michigan

James O'Dell (July 20, 1779 – August 23, 1845), also spelled James Odell, was an American politician who served two terms in the Michigan House of Representatives in the first years of Michigan's statehood.

== Biography ==
James O'Dell was born in Berkeley County, Virginia, on July 20, 1779. He was the son of Rev. Thomas O'Dell and his second wife, Grace Austin. He served in the War of 1812 and reached the rank of captain.

He moved to Highland County, Ohio, when he was 21 years old, then to St. Joseph County, Michigan, in 1831, and Cass County, Michigan, the following year. He was a miller by trade, and built a mill near Vandalia, Michigan, at a site later known as O'Dell's Mill. A confrontation at O'Dell's Mill between area abolitionists and Kentucky slaveowners in 1847, which led to the Kentuckians going home without the fugitive slaves they were chasing, lent urgency to Southerners' demands that led to the Fugitive Slave Act of 1850.

He was a township supervisor for six years, and was a delegate to the state constitutional convention in 1835. He served in the first and third sessions of the Michigan House of Representatives.

He died on August 23, 1845, in Vandalia, and was buried in Birch Lake Cemetery in Cass County.

=== Family ===
O'Dell's father officiated at his wedding to Catharine Pittinger in Adams County, Ohio, on February 28, 1804. They had three children who died in childhood, Alen, Jasper, and Samuel, one who died at age fourteen, Elizabeth, and seven who lived to adulthood, William, Eliza Ann, Thomas Edward, Josiah, Emeline, John Wesley, and Nathan. William went on to serve in the Ohio Legislature.
