= George W. Ferrington =

American politician

Member of the Michigan House of Representatives from the Wayne County district
- In office November 2, 1835 – December 31, 1837
- In office January 4, 1847 – January 2, 1848

Personal details
- Born: 1790 or 1795 Herkimer County, New York
- Died: April 6, 1854
- Party: Democratic

George W. Ferrington (1790 or 1795 – April 6, 1854) was an American politician who served three terms in the Michigan House of Representatives.

== Biography ==
George Ferrington was born in Herkimer County, New York. His birthday is given as either Feb. 22, 1790, or the year 1795.

Ferrington received a grant of land from President Andrew Jackson in 1828, along Five Mile Road (now Fenkell Avenue) west of Telegraph Road. He moved there from Steuben County, New York, in 1829. He was elected supervisor of Pekin Township on August 4, 1832, and re-elected when Pekin was renamed Redford Township, Michigan, the following year. He served in the role from 1832 to 1840, from 1843 to 1845, 1847 to 1849, and again in 1850. He also served as road commissioner and justice of the peace. He was a delegate to the state's first constitutional convention in 1835, and was elected as a Democrat to the Michigan House of Representatives for its first session in 1835, and again in 1837 and 1847.

Ferrington died on April 6, 1854.

=== Family ===
Ferrington married Prudence Pearsall, who died in 1847. They had eight children: Roldon, Henry, Susan, John, John P., Harriet, Henriette, and Polly.
