= Roswell Britton =

American politician

Member of the Michigan House of Representatives from the Kent, Ottawa, Ionia and Clinton Counties district
- In office November 2, 1835 – January 1, 1837

Personal details
- Born: 1788 or 1789 Vermont, United States
- Died: June 10, 1850 (aged 60–61)
- Party: Democratic

Roswell Britton (1788 or 1789 – June 10, 1850) was an American politician who served in the Michigan House of Representatives in its first session after adoption of the state's constitution.

== Biography ==
Roswell Britton was born in Vermont. His birthday is given as either July 21, 1788, or June 16, 1789. He served in the War of 1812 in Churchill's Regiment of the New York Volunteers from 1813 to 1814.

Britton and his wife Sarah H. were living in Batavia, New York and moved to Michigan in 1824. By December 1825, he was living in Ann Arbor and was a delegate to a convention to nominate officers for Washtenaw County. He moved to Grandville, Michigan, in Kent County, in 1834. That year, he built a sawmill in partnership with Nathaniel Brown. The mill, on Buck Creek, milled the first shipment of Michigan white pine lumber that arrived in Chicago on the White Pigeon in April 1835.

Britton, a Democrat, was elected to the first session of the Michigan House of Representatives following adoption of the state constitution in 1835. Britton served as treasurer of Kent County several times, in 1837 and from 1843 through 1846. He also served as a justice of the peace from 1845 to 1846. When the town of Byron was reorganized as Wyoming, Michigan, in 1848, Britton was again elected as a justice.

He died on June 10, 1850, and is buried in Grandville Cemetery.

=== Family ===
Sarah Britton was born about 1800 and died May 9, 1847.
