= Hiram Dodge =

American politician (1804–1891)

Member of the Michigan House of Representatives from the Lenawee County district
- In office November 2, 1835 – January 1, 1837

Personal details
- Born: October 15, 1804 Montgomery County, New York, US

Hiram Dodge (October 15, 1804 – December 26, 1891) was an American politician who served one term in the Michigan House of Representatives immediately after adoption of the state's first constitution.

== Biography ==
Hiram Dodge was born in Montgomery County, New York, on October 15, 1804, the son of Noah Dodge and Elizabeth Venning. His father was a veteran of the American Revolutionary War, and his mother was a native of London, England. Dodge worked as a clerk and a merchant in New York until 1832, when he moved to Clinton, Michigan. He continued to engage in the mercantile business, and also began manufacturing fanning mills. He married Lydia O. Hooper of Seneca County, New York, in Clinton on December 19, 1833. They had one daughter.

Dodge was elected in 1835 to the first session of the Michigan House of Representatives as a representative from Lenawee County, Michigan.

His business was successful, and he owned a large amount of land, but the Panic of 1837 caused him to go broke by 1843. At that time, he moved to Tippecanoe County, Indiana, and lived there until 1866, when he moved to Watseka, Illinois.

He died on December 26, 1891, in Shelby, Cleveland County, North Carolina. He and his wife, Lydia, are buried in Spring Vale Cemetery, Lafayette, Tippecanoe County, Indiana.
