= Isaac I. Voorheis =

American politician

Member of the Michigan House of Representatives from the Oakland County district
- In office November 2, 1835 – January 1, 1837
- In office January 3, 1848 – December 31, 1848

Personal details
- Born: December 22, 1799 Virginia, United States
- Died: August 2, 1886 (aged 86) Lapeer, Michigan
- Party: Democratic

Isaac I. Voorheis, also Voorhees or Voorhies, (December 22, 1799 – August 2, 1886) was an American politician who served two terms in the Michigan House of Representatives.

== Biography ==
Isaac I. Voorheis was born in Virginia on December 22, 1799, the son of Isaac Johannes Voorheis and Sarah Nevius. His father fought in the Revolutionary War as a member of the New Jersey state militia. His parents moved the family to Seneca County, New York, in 1804, and in 1818 he moved to Riga, New York, and lived there for six years.

In May 1824, he moved to Waterford, Michigan, and engaged in farming, and within a few years became active in politics in the county. He was a Democrat, and was a supervisor in Pontiac in 1833 and 1834 and a delegate to the state's first constitutional convention in 1835. He served a term in the Michigan House of Representatives in 1835 and 1836, and another term in 1848.

Voorheis sold his farm and moved into nearby Pontiac during the Civil War, then moved to Lapeer, Michigan, in 1866, and died there on August 2, 1886.

=== Family ===
Voorheis married Ann Merlin, of New York, in 1826. She died in 1864, and in 1869 he married Jane E. Hovey, of Pontiac.
