= Darius Mead (Michigan politician) =

American politician

Member of the Michigan House of Representatives from the Lenawee County district
- In office November 2, 1835 – January 1, 1837

Personal details
- Born: January 27, 1798 Lanesborough, Massachusetts
- Died: January 1859 (aged 60–61) Blissfield, Michigan
- Party: Democratic

Darius Mead (January 27, 1798 – 1859) was an American politician who served one term in the Michigan House of Representatives.

== Biography ==
Darius Mead was born in Lanesborough, Massachusetts, on January 27, 1798, the son of Stephen and Druzilla Mead. He settled in Michigan in 1833.

Mead was elected as a Democrat to the Michigan House of Representatives as a representative from Lenawee County in 1835, where he also served as a justice and associate county judge. In 1836, he was named a commissioner of the River Raisin and Lake Erie Railroad Company.

He died in Blissfield, Michigan, in 1859.

=== Family ===
Mead married Minerva B. Gardner. They had four children: John, Minerva, Helen M., and Daniel.
