= Ezra Convis =

American politician

1st Speaker of the Michigan House of Representatives
- In office 1835–1836
- Preceded by: Position established
- Succeeded by: Charles W. Whipple

Member of the Michigan House of Representatives from the Calhoun County district
- In office 1835–1837
- Succeeded by: Sands McCamley

Personal details
- Died: February 27, 1837
- Party: Democratic

Ezra Convis (died February 27, 1837) was the first speaker of the Michigan House of Representatives and the founder of Verona, Michigan.

Convis was a born in Vermont. He later moved to Silver Creek, Chautauqua County, New York. He first visited Michigan, specifically Battle Creek, in 1832. He moved to Michigan in 1834, settling the town of Verona. He served as a delegate to the 1835 Michigan constitutional convention, where he represented the 10th district. In 1835 he was elected to the new Michigan House of Representatives and was chosen as the first speaker of the house. Convis was re-elected in 1837 but died that year as a result of a sleigh accident that occurred while he was returning to Detroit (then the capital of Michigan) from attending the wedding of a daughter of Mr. Ten Eyck in Dearborn.

Convis was a Jacksonian Democrat. He was a Freemason and a Baptist.
