= George Howe (politician) =

American politician

Member of the Michigan House of Representatives from the Lenawee County district
- In office November 2, 1835 – January 1, 1837

George Howe was an American politician who served in the Michigan House of Representatives immediately after adoption of the state's first constitution.

== Career ==
George Howe settled in what is now Bridgewater Township in Washtenaw County, Michigan in 1832. A portion of Dexter Township, Michigan, had been set aside as a new township named Hixon Township, and Howe was elected its first supervisor in April 1833. That year, Hixon was divided again, and Howe chose the name Bridgewater for the new township, after a town in Oneida County, New York, and he was again elected supervisor. He was elected as a representative from Lenawee County in the first election following adoption of Michigan's constitution, and served in 1835 and 1836.

In 1837 or 1838, Howe purchased a quarter-section of land in the village of Jefferson in Alaiedon Township, Michigan, and built a sawmill. He later sold the property and mill to Captain J. P. Cowles. Howe pushed for Jefferson to become the county seat of Ingham County, but the town of Mason won the honor.

In 1838, Howe was the president of a wildcat bank in Manchester, Michigan, which went bust and cost its depositors their money.
