= John Brewer (Michigan politician) =

American politician

Member of the Michigan House of Representatives from the Washtenaw County district
- In office November 2, 1835 – January 1, 1837

Personal details
- Born: May 14, 1800
- Died: June 2, 1870 (aged 70)

John Brewer (May 14, 1800 – June 2, 1870) was an American farmer and politician who served in the first session of the Michigan House of Representatives after adoption of the state constitution.

== Biography ==
John Brewer was born on May 14, 1800. In September 1825, he and his brother Abram were among the first settlers in the area of Superior Township, Michigan, known as the Free Church neighborhood. Abram died soon after their arrival. John Brewer purchased 160 acres (65 ha) of land in the area in April 1826, another 160 acres by 1840, and a third 160-acre tract by 1856.

Brewer served as a delegate to the state constitutional convention in 1835, and was elected to the first session of the Michigan House of Representatives following the constitution's approval. He established the first post office in Superior on March 2, 1838, and was its first postmaster. He served in other official positions in the area, including township supervisor in 1848, 1849, and 1858, and as a justice in 1852.

He was instrumental in building a church building in 1855 for the First Free Church of Michigan, which had previously met in his home. The building itself was razed in the 1930s, but the cemetery still remains, and was in use for burials through 1952. The church was open to all denominations.

Brewer died on June 2, 1870, and is buried in the Free Church Cemetery.
