= Orrin Howe =

American politician

Member of the Michigan House of Representatives from the Washtenaw County district
- In office November 2, 1835 – December 31, 1837
- In office January 2, 1843 – December 31, 1843

Personal details
- Born: 1786 Danbury, Connecticut, US
- Died: February 12, 1848 (aged 61–62)
- Party: Democratic

Orrin Howe (1786 – February 12, 1848) was an American farmer and politician who was one of the first settlers in Lodi Township, Michigan, and served three terms in the Michigan House of Representatives.

== Biography ==
Orrin Howe was born in Danbury, Connecticut in 1786. He was a farmer and moved to Chenango County, New York, in 1802. He married Jane Mead, the daughter of a prominent citizen of the area, John Mead. After suffering trouble in business, he decided to move to Michigan Territory and settled in Lodi Township in Washtenaw County. He was one of the first four settlers in Lodi when he purchased his property in 1825. He built a log cabin and went back to New York to collect his family, who joined him the following May.

He was elected a justice of the peace in Lodi in April 1831, and also served as the community's first postmaster from 1827 to 1848. The first township meeting after Lodi was formally organized as a township on March 7, 1834, was held at Howe's house. He was a member of the first state constitutional convention in 1835 and was elected three times to the Michigan House of Representatives as a Democrat. He served as speaker pro tempore in 1835 and 1836.

Howe was Universalist. Howe was a Freemason. Howe and his wife had six children: Betsy, Philander R., Polly Harlow, Sarah, Edwin, and Jane. Betsy died shortly after the family had moved to Lodi; hers was the first death recorded in the township. Howe died on February 12, 1848.
