= James Wheeler (American politician) =

American politician

Member of the Michigan House of Representatives from the Lenawee County district
- In office November 2, 1835 – January 1, 1837

Personal details
- Born: March 21, 1793 Saratoga County, New York
- Died: February 20, 1854 (aged 60) Tecumseh, Michigan
- Party: Democratic

James Wheeler (March 21, 1793 – February 20, 1854) was an American politician who served in the Michigan House of Representatives immediately following adoption of the state's first constitution.

== Biography ==
James Wheeler was born in Saratoga County, New York, on March 21, 1793. He later lived in Wheeler, New York, a town which was named after his family.

In 1834, Wheeler settled and farmed in Tecumseh, Michigan. He was elected as a Democrat to the Michigan House of Representatives in 1835, and served as a justice from 1837 to 1841.

He died in Tecumseh on February 20, 1854.
