= Allen Hutchins =

American politician

Member of the Michigan House of Representatives from the Lenawee County district
- In office November 2, 1835 – January 1, 1837

Personal details
- Party: Democratic

Allen Hutchins was an American politician who served in the Michigan House of Representatives in its first session after the adoption of the state constitution.

== Biography ==
Allen Hutchins moved to Adrian, Michigan, in 1833 from Orleans County, New York, and practiced law there until 1836.

He was elected as a Democrat to the Michigan House of Representatives in 1835 and served as a representative from Lenawee County through 1836. In 1836, he was appointed receiver of the land office in Ionia, Michigan. He was accused of being a defaulter while in office, and excoriated by the Whig-leaning newspapers, although he proclaimed his innocence. He returned to Adrian after his term and died a few years later.
