= Rylands =

Rylands is an English surname. Notable people with the surname include:

- Dadie Rylands (1902–1999), real name George Rylands, British literary scholar and theatre director
- Dave Rylands (born 1953), English footballer
- Enriqueta Augustina Rylands (1843–1908), English philanthropist
- John Rylands (1801–1888), English textile merchant and philanthropist
- John Paul Rylands (1846–1923), English lawyer, genealogist and topographer
- L. Gordon Rylands (1862–1942), British criminologist and writer
- Mark Rylands (born 1961), Church of England bishop
- Patrick Rylands (born 1943), English designer
- Peter Rylands (1820–1887), English wire manufacturer and politician
- Sir Peter Rylands, 1st Baronet (1868–1948), British businessman, son of Peter Rylands
- Sir William Rylands (1868–1948), British businessman

== See also ==
- John Rylands Library in Manchester
- John Rylands University Library in Manchester
- Rylands, hamlet in St Breward parish, Cornwall, England
- Rylands, southern part of the town of Beeston, Nottinghamshire
- Warrington_Rylands 1906 F.C., English football club
- Ryland (surname)
