= Ryland (surname) =

Ryland is a surname, and may refer to

- Adolfine Mary Ryland (1903–1983), English artist
- Andrew Ryland (born 1981), American rugby union player
- Antwaun Powell-Ryland (born 2002), American football player
- Bertha Ryland (1882–1977), militant suffragette
- Bob Ryland (1920–2020), American former tennis player and coach
- Caius T. Ryland (1826—1897), American politician
- Chad Ryland (born 1999), American football player
- Sir Charles Smith-Ryland (1927–1989), English landowner and farmer, Lord Lieutenant of Warwickshire
- George Washington Ryland (1827–1910), Wisconsin politician
- George Ryland (Queensland politician) (1855–1920), member of the Queensland Legislative Assembly
- Henry Ryland (1856–1924), British painter, book illustrator, decorator and designer
- Harris Ryland, fictional character in the American television series Dallas
- Herman Witsius Ryland (1760–1838), English colonial administrator in Canada
- Ingrid Ryland (born 1989), Norwegian footballer
- Jens Fredrik Ryland (born 1974), Norwegian guitarist
- John Ryland (1753–1825), English Baptist minister
- John Ryland (priest), Church of Ireland cleric in the 19th century
- John Collett Ryland (1723–1792), English Baptist minister and author
- John Ferguson Ryland (1797–1873), American judge
- Jonathan Edwards Ryland (1798–1866), English man of letters and tutor
- Louisa Ryland (1814–1889), English philanthropist
- Octavius Ryland (1800–1886), English convict transported to Australia, later a school teacher
- Robert Ryland (1805–1899), first president of Richmond College, Virginia
- William Wynne Ryland (1732/8–1783), English engraver
- William Ryland (1770–1846), American businessman and Methodist minister

== See also ==
- Rylands
