= Julie Cooper (politician) =

British Labour Party politician

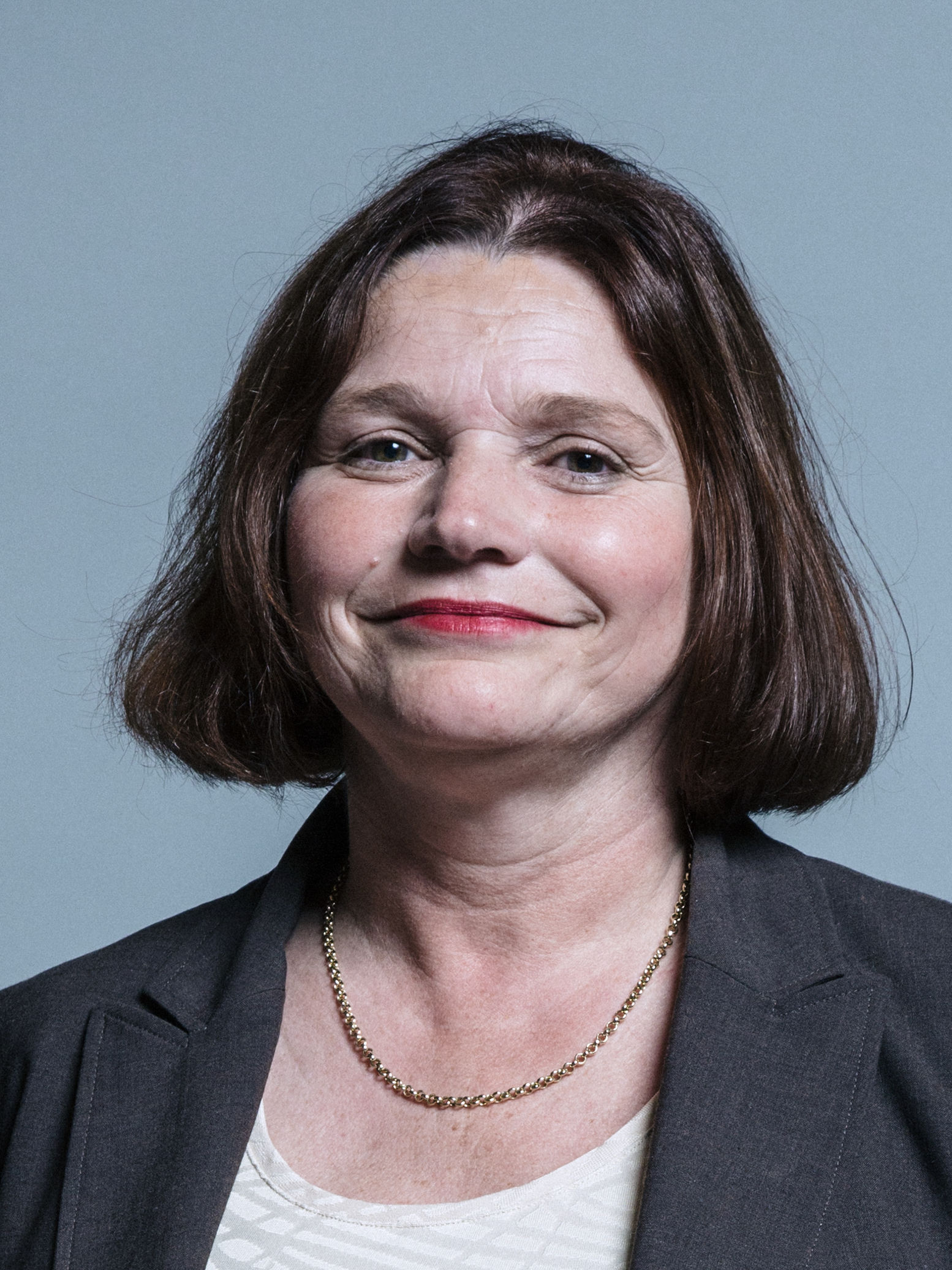
- Official portrait, 2017

Shadow Minister for Community Health
- In office 9 October 2016 – 12 December 2019
- Leader: Jeremy Corbyn
- Preceded by: Position established
- Succeeded by: Position abolished

Member of Parliament for Burnley
- In office 7 May 2015 – 6 November 2019
- Preceded by: Gordon Birtwistle
- Succeeded by: Antony Higginbotham

Personal details
- Born: 20 June 1960 (age 66) Burnley, Lancashire, England
- Party: Labour

Julie Elizabeth Cooper (born 20 June 1960) is a British Labour Party politician who served as the Member of Parliament (MP) for Burnley from 2015 to 2019.

== Career ==
=== Local politics and 2010 general election ===
An English teacher by profession, Cooper studied at Edge Hill University before going on to teach at secondary level. She then went on to run a Burnley-based pharmacy business with her husband. She was first elected as a Labour councillor for Burnley Borough Council's Bank Hall ward in May 2005, and later became leader of the Labour group. In the May 2012 local elections Labour regained control of the council with Cooper becoming council leader.

She was selected as Labour's candidate to contest the 2010 General Election in December 2009, after the sitting Labour MP, Kitty Ussher, decided to stand down at the election. The selection of Ussher's successor caused some controversy, when Labour's National Executive Committee ruled that the constituency should adopt an all female shortlist, a decision it subsequently overturned following accusations of unfairness.

Cooper contested the general election in May 2010, but was defeated by the Liberal Democrat candidate, Gordon Birtwistle. Burnley, which had returned a Labour candidate at every election since 1935, was one of three constituencies in East Lancashire that the party lost in 2010, something that local activists blamed on the unpopularity of the government of Gordon Brown.

The loss of emergency hospital services in the town, which were moved to nearby Blackburn, had also become a contentious issue, and Birtwistle had campaigned on a platform to bring them back.

=== 2015 general election and constituency MP ===
In July 2013, she was selected to contest the seat again in 2015, an all female shortlist was used, and selection was conducted through a secret ballot. Along with other seats in East Lancashire, Labour regarded winning the Burnley constituency as an important step to return to government.

Among the issues Cooper's campaign focused on were employment, health, and questioning the effects of the austerity programme pursued by the Conservative–Liberal Democrat coalition. She rejected Birtwistle's argument that Burnley Hospital's upgraded urgent-care centre was effectively an accident and emergency department, and claimed credit for new investment in the town during her tenure as leader of the council.

At the election she took the seat back from the Liberal Democrats, defeating Birtwistle with a 6.3% swing in Labour's favour. Following the resignation of Ed Miliband as Labour leader in the wake of the election, Cooper was one of 68 MPs to give their support to Andy Burnham in the subsequent leadership contest.

Cooper gave her maiden speech to the House of Commons on 1 June. On 4 June Cooper was announced as one of twenty House of Commons backbenchers who would be given parliamentary time to introduce a private member's bill, coming fourth on the list. Her bill, to exempt carers from having to pay hospital car parking charges, received its first reading on 24 June. At the second reading, in October, the Conservative MP Philip Davies talked it out in a filibuster.

When, in September 2015, Labour elected Jeremy Corbyn as Miliband's successor with 59.5% of first preference votes, and Tom Watson as his deputy, Cooper called for members to support the party's new leadership: "This is a very decisive result. There is no arguing about it. It’s plain to see what the party members want. The job now is to get 100% behind the leader and the deputy." She later supported Owen Smith in the failed attempt to replace Corbyn in the 2016 Labour leadership election.

Cooper supported Remain in the EU referendum. Following the vote, in which the Burnley electorate voted 66.6% in favour of Leave, she said she was “in shock” at the result. She added: “There has been a lot of nonsense on both sides but I have certainly never been one for scaremongering. I actually do think this will leave the NHS worse off though. I really do worry for its future”. She also said it was “a time of great uncertainty for business owners in general”. In September 2017, she voted against the European Repeal Bill.

In 2019, Cooper stood for re-election and was one of the many Labour MPs to be defeated, in her case by Conservative challenger Antony Higginbotham.

Parliament of the United Kingdom
Preceded by Gordon Birtwistle	Member of Parliament for Burnley; 2015–2019	Succeeded by Antony Higginbotham
