= Sir Peter Rylands, 1st Baronet =

British businessman

Sir Peter Rylands
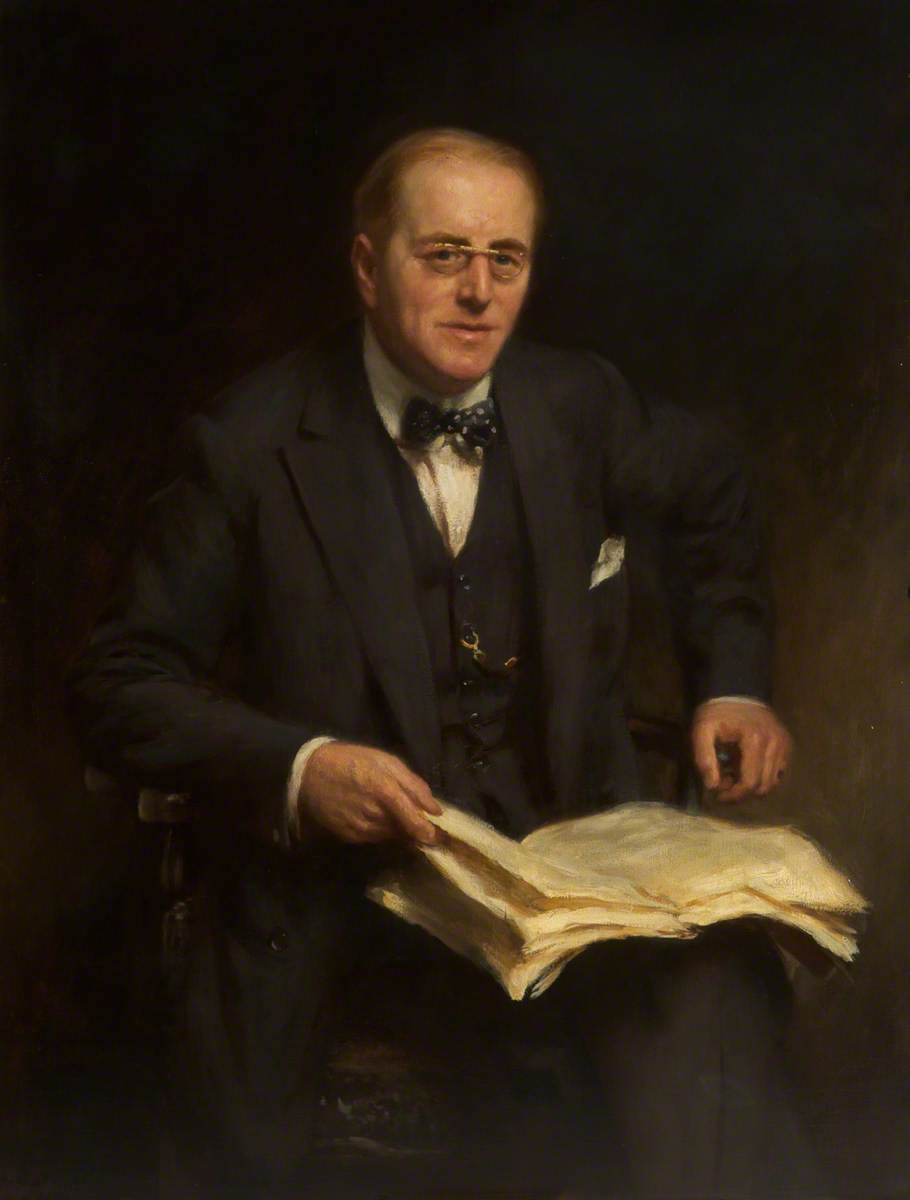
- Sir Peter Rylands, c. 1920
- Born: 23 October 1868
- Died: 22 October 1948 (aged 79)
- Father: Peter Rylands
- Relatives: L. Gordon Rylands (brother); Dadie Rylands (nephew)

Sir William Peter Rylands, 1st Baronet (23 October 1868 – 22 October 1948) was a British businessman.

== Biography ==
He was the third son of Peter Rylands, and nephew of John Rylands. After education at Charterhouse School, he matriculated at Trinity College, Cambridge in 1887. He graduated B.A. in 1892, having left Cambridge in 1890 and visited Mashonaland in 1891. He was called to the bar at the Inner Temple in 1894, and as a barrister went the Northern Circuit.

John Rylands died in 1898, and the younger Peter Rylands succeeded him as managing director of Rylands Brothers, the family business making wire. It was bought about eight years later by the Pearson Knowles combine, with Rylands continuing to run the business. He was President of the Federation of British Industries in 1919 to 1921, in which year he was knighted, of the Iron and Steel Institute in 1926–7, and of the National Federation of Iron and Steel Manufacturers in 1930.

Rylands served as High Sheriff of Cheshire in 1935. He was created a baronet, of Thelwall in the County Palatine of Chester, in 1939. He died on 22 October 1948, at home at Massey Hall, Grappenhall.

== Family ==
Rylands married in 1894 Nora Mary de Angelis (1865–1946), daughter of David de Angelis of Paris. The couple had no children, and the baronetcy became extinct in 1949.

Baronetage of the United Kingdom
New creation	Baronet (of Thelwall); 1939–1948	Extinct
