= 1904 Harborough by-election =

UK parliamentary by-election

Philip Stanhope.

The 1904 Harborough by-election was a Parliamentary by-election held on 17 June 1904. The constituency returned one Member of Parliament (MP) to the House of Commons of the United Kingdom, elected by the first past the post voting system.

== Result ==
1904 Harborough by-election
Party	Candidate	Votes	%	±%
Liberal	Philip Stanhope	7,843	56.2	+1.2
Conservative	Charles Harvey Dixon	6,110	43.8	−1.2
Majority		1,733	12.4	+2.4
Turnout		13,953	82.9	+1.0
Registered electors		16,829		
Liberal hold		Swing	+1.2	
