= Richard Shaw (Liberal politician) =

British politician

Member of Parliament for Burnley
- In office 1868–1876
- Preceded by: New constituency
- Succeeded by: Peter Rylands

Personal details
- Born: 6 August 1825 Burnley, Lancashire
- Died: 19 January 1876 (aged 50)
- Party: Liberal Party

Richard Shaw (6 August 1825 – 19 January 1876) was a British Liberal Party politician.

== Early life ==
Shaw was born in Burnley, Lancashire and educated at Burnley Grammar School and St Peter's School, York

== Career ==
At the 1868 general election, Shaw was elected as the first Member of Parliament (MP) for the newly enfranchised parliamentary borough of Burnley in Lancashire. He was re-elected in 1874, and held the seat until his death in 1876, aged 50.

Parliament of the United Kingdom
New constituency	Member of Parliament for Burnley; 1868 – 1876	Succeeded by Peter Rylands
