= 1893 Burnley by-election =

UK parliamentary by-election

The 1893 Burnley by-election was held on 6 February 1893 after the resignation of the incumbent Liberal MP Jabez Spencer Balfour due to the collapse of the Liberator Building Society, for which he was eventually convicted. It was retained by the Liberal candidate Philip Stanhope.

Burnley by-election, 1893
Party	Candidate	Votes	%	±%
Liberal	Philip Stanhope	6,199	53.0	−3.2
Conservative	William Alexander Lindsay	5,506	47.0	+3.2
Majority		693	6.0	−6.4
Turnout		11,705	91.3	+0.3
Registered electors		12,826		
Liberal hold		Swing	-3.2	
