= Dan Jones (politician) =

British politician

Member of Parliament for Burnley
- In office 8 October 1959 – 13 May 1983
- Preceded by: Wilfrid Burke
- Succeeded by: Peter Pike

Personal details
- Born: 26 September 1908
- Died: 19 February 1985 (aged 76)
- Party: Labour
- Children: 3 (including Dari Taylor)

Daniel Jones (26 September 1908 – 19 February 1985) was a British Labour Party politician, and Member of Parliament (MP) for Burnley from 1959 to 1983.

== Early life ==
Jones was educated at Ynyshir School, Rhondda and the National Council of Labour Colleges where he himself became a lecturer. He was a trade union official.

== Parliamentary career ==
He unsuccessfully contested the Barry constituency at the 1955 general election, but was returned as MP for Burnley at the 1959 general election. He was re-elected until his retirement at the 1983 general election, when he was succeeded by Peter Pike. Jones's Conservative opponent in the 1979 election was Ann Widdecombe, who was making her first parliamentary contest.

Jones never attained ministerial office, but served as parliamentary private secretary to Douglas Jay the President of the Board of Trade in 1964.

== Family ==
He was married to his wife, Phylis. He had three children (two sons and a daughter) and fostered three more. His daughter Dari Taylor went on to become the Member of Parliament for Stockton South serving between 1997 and 2010.

Parliament of the United Kingdom
Preceded by Wilfrid Burke	Member of Parliament for Burnley; 1959–1983	Succeeded by Peter Pike
