= Peter Pike (British politician) =

British politician (1937–2021)

Member of Parliament for Burnley
- In office 9 June 1983 – 11 April 2005
- Preceded by: Dan Jones
- Succeeded by: Kitty Ussher

Personal details
- Born: Peter Leslie Pike; 26 June 1937 Ware, Hertfordshire, England
- Died: 27 December 2021 (aged 84) Burnley, England
- Party: Labour
- Spouse: Shelia Bull (m. 1962; died 2017)
- Children: 2

Peter Leslie Pike (26 June 1937 – 27 December 2021) was a British Labour politician who served as Member of Parliament (MP) for Burnley from June 1983 to April 2005.

== Life and career ==
Pike was born on 26 June 1937. He was evacuated to Burnley in his childhood during the Second World War and decided then that he wanted to be the Member of Parliament (MP) for the Lancashire town. Returning to the town as an adult, he worked in the Mullards Factory, where he swiftly gained a reputation as an effective shop steward and was also an agent for the then MP for Burnley, Dan Jones.

He was an official frontbench spokesperson for Labour at the beginning of the 1990s on rural affairs and then on environment and housing. He was seen as an effective parliamentarian, and his committee work included chairing the committee in the House of Commons on Regulatory Reform from July 2001 to April 2005. He made three visits to South Africa from 1986 to 1990.

He announced his intention in October 2002 to retire as an MP at the next general election. Labour announced in December 2002 they were preparing to choose a woman as his successor. An all-women shortlist was created in January 2003 to determine his successor. His youngest daughter Jane was a firm favourite to succeed him, but she did not make the shortlist. Kitty Ussher was chosen as his successor in February 2004.

His role in the Anti-Apartheid Movement was praised in Parliament in December 2013 during tributes to Nelson Mandela.

He was re-elected as chair of Burnley Constituency Labour Party in June 2015. He stood down from this role in January 2016, citing his belief that the party needed a younger and more active chair. Upon his resignation, Pike had held positions within the Labour Party for almost sixty years. He had first arrived in Burnley in 1963. He was a strong supporter of Burnley Football Club and served as chair of the Clarets Trust.

He was also the driving force behind the establishment of the social enterprise Emmaus Burnley, for which he received a special medal in June 2021.

== Personal life ==
He married Shelia Bull in 1962; she died in November 2017 at the age of 83.

Pike died on 27 December 2021 at the age of 84. He was survived by his two daughters, Carol and Jane. Former Pendle MP Gordon Prentice paid tribute to him in his blog shortly afterwards.

Parliament of the United Kingdom
Preceded by Dan Jones	Member of Parliament for Burnley; 1983–2005	Succeeded by Kitty Ussher
