= John Howarth Grey =

Cotton Manufacturer and politician

Sir John Howarth Grey (19 July 1875 – 1 January 1960), was a British Cotton Manufacturer and Liberal Party politician.

== Background ==
Grey was born the son of James Mitchell Grey. In 1901 he married Emma Harling. They had one son and one daughter. He was knighted in 1935.

== Professional career ==
Grey was Chairman, John Grey Ltd, Burnley, Cotton Manufacturers, Director of Lancashire Cotton Corporation, Ltd and the Manchester Board of North British Mercantile Ins. Co. Ltd. He was President of the Cotton Spinners and Manufacturers Association. He was Chairman of the Burnley Building Society.

== Political career ==
Grey was elected to Burnley Town Council in 1910, appointed an Alderman in 1923 and retired in 1949. He was appointed a Justice of the Peace for Burnley in 1913. He was Liberal candidate for the Burnley division of Lancashire at the 1918 General Election. He did not stand for parliament again.

=== Electoral record ===
General Election December 1918: Burnley
Party		Candidate	Votes	%	±%
	Labour	David Daniel Irving	15,217	41.9	+18.1
C	Unionist	Henry George Hill Mulholland	12,289	33.8	−3.7
	Liberal	John Howarth Grey	8,825	24.3	−14.3
Majority			2,928	8.1	
Turnout			21,114	71.4	−22.7
	Labour gain from Liberal		Swing	+16.2	
C indicates candidate endorsed by the coalition government.
