= Kitty Ussher =

British politician (born 1971)

The Right Honourable The Baroness Ussher
- Kitty Ussher in 2009

Exchequer Secretary to the Treasury
- In office 9 June 2009 – 17 June 2009
- Prime Minister: Gordon Brown
- Preceded by: Angela Eagle
- Succeeded by: Sarah McCarthy-Fry

Parliamentary Under-Secretary of State for Work and Pensions
- In office 5 October 2008 – 9 June 2009
- Prime Minister: Gordon Brown
- Preceded by: James Plaskitt
- Succeeded by: Helen Goodman

Economic Secretary to the Treasury
- In office 29 June 2007 – 5 October 2008
- Prime Minister: Gordon Brown
- Preceded by: Ed Balls
- Succeeded by: Ian Pearson

Member of Parliament for Burnley
- In office 5 May 2005 – 12 April 2010
- Preceded by: Peter Pike
- Succeeded by: Gordon Birtwistle

Member of the House of Lords
- Lord Temporal
- Life peerage 3 September 2026

Personal details
- Born: Katharine Anne Ussher; 18 March 1971 (age 55) Aylesbury, Buckinghamshire, England
- Party: Labour
- Spouse: Peter J Colley
- Children: 1 son, 1 daughter
- Parents: Patrick David Lance Ussher (father); Susan Margaret Bottomley (mother)
- Relatives: Peter Bottomley (uncle); Virginia Bottomley (aunt-in-law)
- Education: Balliol College, Oxford, Birkbeck, University of London

Katharine Anne Ussher, Baroness Ussher (born 18 March 1971) is a British economist, public policy research professional, and politician.

She was previously served as a Labour Party MP and Treasury minister, and later as the Chief Executive of the Demos think tank. In 2023, she was elected a Fellow of the Academy of Social Sciences.

After training as an economist and working as a macroeconomic forecaster at the Economist Intelligence Unit, she was elected Member of Parliament (MP) for Burnley at the 2005 general election, succeeding Peter Pike. Seen as a high flier, she went on to serve as a minister in Gordon Brown's government from 2007 to 2009, mainly at the Treasury, but also at the Department for Work and Pensions, having previously been a Special Advisor at the Department for Trade and Industry. At the time she was the second-youngest government minister, and the youngest woman.

Ussher resigned from her ministerial role in 2009 following her involvement in the United Kingdom parliamentary expenses scandal in which it was reported she had taken action on the advice of her accountants to reduce her capital gains tax liability. She did not stand at the 2010 election, citing the desire for a more normal family life while her children were young. Since then, after teaching mathematics, she has worked primarily in public policy thought leadership, at Demos, as Managing Director of Tooley Street Research, and at the Institute of Directors.

== Early life and education ==
Ussher is the daughter of an Anglo-Irish lawyer father and a headmistress mother whose brother is Conservative MP, Sir Peter Bottomley. Consequently, she is a niece-in-law of former Conservative cabinet minister Virginia Bottomley, and a granddaughter of the diplomat Sir James Bottomley. She is also distantly descended from the family of Archbishop James Ussher.

Ussher was educated at the independent St Paul's Girls' School; she subsequently attended Balliol College, Oxford, where she read PPE, and Birkbeck College, London, where she took an MSc degree in economics.

== Early career ==
In her early career, she was chief economist for Britain in Europe, and an economist at the Economist Intelligence Unit and the Centre for European Reform, as well as working for MPs Paul Boateng, Martin O'Neill, Kim Howells and Adam Ingram.

From 1998 to 2002, she also served as a councillor for Vassall ward in the London Borough of Lambeth, where she chaired the Council's Finance and Environment Scrutiny Committees. From 2001, until her selection as a parliamentary candidate in February 2004, she was special adviser to Patricia Hewitt at the Department of Trade and Industry.

== Parliamentary career ==
=== House of Commons ===
Ussher was elected as the member of Parliament for Burnley at the 2005 general election, having been selected through an All-Women Shortlist as the constituency's Labour candidate. The new intake of MPs was called the brightest for a generation.

From 2005 to 2006, Ussher was a member of the Public Accounts Committee. She was Parliamentary Private Secretary to Margaret Hodge, the Minister of State at the Department of Trade and Industry, until 29 June 2007.

In Gordon Brown's first reshuffle, she was appointed as City Minister, Economic Secretary to the Treasury, succeeding Ed Balls. The timing of her appointment, as the first signs of the 2008 financial crisis appeared, meant that she was party to crucial meetings of the Tripartite Committee of Treasury, FSA and the Bank of England as the authorities dealt with the collapse of Northern Rock, the 2008 financial crisis and its legislative response. She chaired the Treasury Islamic Finance Group, leading to the issuance of the first sukuk government bond, co-chaired with Hector Sants the official High-Level Working Group on the efficiency of the UK capital-raising process, and co-chaired with Sir Michael Snyder the High-Level Working Group on the professional services sector.

Her period in office also saw a review of the policy towards co-operatives and credit unions, to give them greater commercial freedom and ability to expand. She also developed the policy leading to the Dormant Bank and Building Society Accounts Act 2008 that redistributes unclaimed banking assets to community use, and the Savings Gateway Act 2009 that provides financial incentives to poorer people to save.

On 5 October 2008, she moved to become Parliamentary Under-Secretary of State at the Department for Work and Pensions, taking on broad welfare reform responsibilities previously undertaken by Stephen Timms and James Plaskitt. At the time of the reshuffle, she was described by Martin Waller, city diarist of The Times, as "one of the brighter denizens of the lower depths of the Brown administration" who had "made herself popular enough in the City".

She became responsible for the government's review of housing benefit policy and a review of the social fund, as well as the Child Support Agency and welfare policy on lone parents. Ussher made London her permanent home in April 2009, moving to Brixton, so she could send her children to school in Westminster.

In the June 2009 reshuffle, she was moved back to the Treasury, this time promoted to Exchequer Secretary to the Treasury, but ten days later resigned to prevent embarrassment to the government regarding her tax position, and was replaced by Sarah McCarthy-Fry, the MP for Portsmouth North.

==== Expenses controversy ====
On 10 May 2009, the Sunday Telegraph reported that within a year of being elected, Ussher was inquiring about claiming for around £20,000 worth of renovations to her London home, a property she had owned for several years before becoming an MP. In her claims she stated: "The plumbing in the entire house is strange [...] The electrics are also odd [...] Most of the ceilings have Artex coverings. Three-dimensional swirls. It could be a matter of taste, but this counts as 'dilapidations' in my book!" A letter produced by the Telegraph include a covering "With Compliments" slip stating "I am aware this takes us over our limit. Please pay as much as you are able".

The following month, Ussher resigned, citing a desire to "prevent embarrassment to the government" after allegations that she also temporarily changed the designation of her "main" home for tax purposes to reduce her tax bill. Ussher's main home was in London, but in order to reduce her capital gains tax bill by £3,420 she temporarily designated her Burnley house as the main residence for one month while it was sold. A letter from her accountants concerning the matter was also hidden from the published official version of her office expenses file published online.

In her resignation letter, Ussher claimed that she had done nothing wrong and that her actions were "in line with HM Revenue and Customs guidance and based on the advice of a reputable firm of accountants who in turn were recommended to me by the House of Commons fees office". She also denied any abuse of the allowances system of the House of Commons. Four years later in an article on her blog, she said she had nevertheless voluntarily paid the amount in question to HMRC, stating that "Public servants should always be at pains to ensure that they are not only compliant with the letter of the law but also with the spirit of it, and I did not focus on that."

At the same time, Ussher announced that she would not contest the next election, citing the difficulties in reconciling her parental responsibilities with the working hours of Parliament, stating that this decision had preceded the expenses controversy. Commenting on her resignation, the BBC described her as a "rising star" who had risen quickly through the ranks, despite only being elected in 2005.

An investigation by Sir Thomas Legg into MPs' claims found that Ussher had breached the retrospectively-applied £11,000 limit for building work in her kitchen and ordered her to repay £1,271.65. Her appeal against the ruling, on the grounds that the limit was not in place at the time the expenses were incurred, was rejected as being outside the scope of the terms of enquiry of Sir Thomas Legg's investigation.

=== House of Lords ===
Ussher was given a life peerage as part of the July 2026 political peerages to sit in the House of Lords as a Labour peer. She was created as Baroness Ussher, of Burnley in the County of Lancashire on 3 September 2026.

== Later career ==
In May 2010, after leaving Parliament, Ussher became the new Chief Executive of Demos, remaining in that post until 2012. She then became a research fellow of the Smith Institute, an associate at the Centre for London, a member of TheCityUK's Independent Economists' Panel, and a co founder of Labour in the City.

In December 2013, she became Managing Director of Tooley Street Research, and economic and policy adviser to Portland Communications. She has also written pamphlets for the Fabian Society, the Social Market Foundation and Policy Network and for the Financial Times.

In February 2015, she joined the Financial Services Consumer Panel, a scrutiny panel for the Financial Conduct Authority regulator. Between 2017 and 2019 she spent two years working as an inner city maths teacher, as part of the inaugural cohort of Now Teach, a scheme to encourage older professionals to switch careers into teaching, stating in her blog that she "thought she should do something useful".

In August 2021, she predicted that unemployment would not rise when the coronavirus furlough scheme ended at the end of the following month. At the time this was out of step with most economic forecasts; however, when the official ONS data were released four months later, her prediction was shown to be correct. In September 2023 she was the only one out of nine members of The Times shadow monetary policy committee to correctly anticipate the Bank of England's decision that month to hold interest rates at 5.25% after 14 consecutive rate rises.

In September 2021, Kitty Ussher was appointed chief economist at the Institute of Directors. She later moved to work at Barclays.

She ran unsuccessfully for the Labour Party in the 2026 Lambeth London Borough Council elections in St Martin's losing to the Greens.

== Personal life ==
Ussher married accountant Peter J. Colley in September 1999 in Hammersmith; they have a daughter (born 2005) and a son (born 2008).

== Publications ==
- The Economic Cost of Inflammatory Bowel Disease in the UK, Demos 2021
- Everyday Places: Creating strong locations to support daily life in Britain, Demos 2021
- Post Pandemic Places, Demos 2021
- Potential Limited: The economic cost of uncontrolled asthma, Demos 2020
- Patient Power: Unleashing choice over routine medications, Demos 2020
- The economic cost of inflammatory bowel disease, Demos, 2021
- Everyday places: creating strong locations to support daily life in Britain, Demos, 2021
- Post pandemic places, Demos, 2021
- Potential limited: the economic cost of uncontrolled asthma, Demos, 2020
- The Learning Curve (co-author), Demos, 2020
- Patient power: unleashing choice over routine medications, Demos 2020
- Improving pay, progression and productivity in the retail sector, Joseph Rowntree Foundation, 2016
- Pay progression: Understanding the barriers for the lowest paid. Chartered Institute of Personnel and Development, 2014
- Wealth of our nation: rethinking policies for wealth distribution. The Smith Institute, 2014
- Good Growth: A Demos and PWC report on economic wellbeing. Demos, 2011
- City Limits: The progressive case for financial services reform. Demos, 2011
- Labour's Record on the Economy. The Political Quarterly, 2010

Parliament of the United Kingdom
Preceded by Peter Pike	Member of Parliament for Burnley; 2005–2010	Succeeded by Gordon Birtwistle
Political offices
Preceded by Ed Balls	Economic Secretary to the Treasury; 2007–2008	Succeeded by Ian Pearson
Preceded by James Plaskitt	Parliamentary Under-Secretary of State for Pensions Reform; 2008–2009	Succeeded by Helen Goodman
Preceded by Angela Eagle	Exchequer Secretary to the Treasury; 2009	Succeeded by Sarah McCarthy-Fry
