= William Mitchell (Burnley MP) =

British politician (1838-1914)

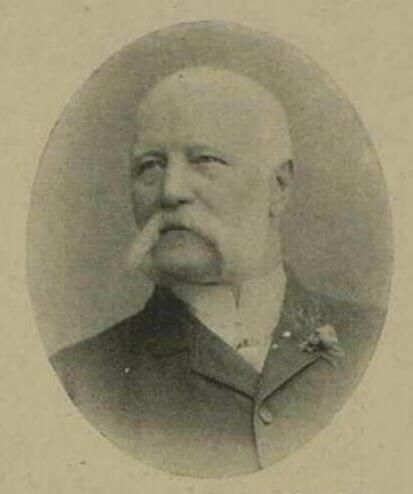
- Born: 27 June 1838
- Died: 5 March 1914 (aged 75)
- Occupation: Politician
- Position held: member of the 27th Parliament of the United Kingdom (1900–1906)

William Mitchell (27 June 1838 – 5 March 1914) was a British Conservative Party politician in Lancashire.

Mitchell was born in Waterfoot, Lancashire and Educated at Burnley Grammar School and Liverpool Collegiate Institution.

He was Chairman of Mitchell Bros. of Waterfoot Ltd, a felt and woollen manufacturer. He had been an unsuccessful candidate in Accrington at the 1895 general election, and then in Middleton at a by-election in November 1897.

He finally won a seat in the House of Commons at the 1900 general election, when he was elected Member of Parliament (MP) for the parliamentary borough of Burnley, defeating the sitting Liberal Party MP Philip Stanhope.

He did not stand again at the 1906 general election, and retired from Parliament aged 67.

Parliament of the United Kingdom
| Preceded by Philip Stanhope | Member of Parliament for Burnley; 1900 – 1906 | Succeeded by Frederick Maddison |
