= Philip Stanhope, 1st Baron Weardale =

British politician (1847–1923)

The Right Honourable The Lord Weardale
- Hon. Philip Stanhope

Member of Parliament for Wednesbury
- In office 1886–1892
- Preceded by: Wilson Lloyd
- Succeeded by: Wilson Lloyd

Member of Parliament for Burnley
- In office 1893–1900
- Preceded by: Jabez Balfour
- Succeeded by: William Mitchell

Member of Parliament for Harborough
- In office 1904–1906
- Preceded by: Paddy Logan
- Succeeded by: R. C. Lehmann

Personal details
- Born: 8 December 1847 Marylebone, London, England
- Died: 1 March 1923 (aged 75) Sevenoaks, Kent
- Resting place: Chevening, Kent, England
- Party: Liberal
- Spouse: Countess Alexandra Tolstoy (m. 1877)
- Parents: Philip Stanhope, 5th Earl Stanhope (father); Emily Harriet Kerrison (mother)
- Relatives: Sir Edward Kerrison (maternal grandfather); Arthur Stanhope (brother); Edward Stanhope (brother)

Philip James Stanhope, 1st Baron Weardale (8 December 1847 – 1 March 1923), was a British Liberal Party politician and philanthropist.

== Background and early life ==
Stanhope was born in Marylebone, London. A member of an important political family, he was the younger son of Philip Stanhope, 5th Earl Stanhope, and Emily Harriet Kerrison, daughter of General Sir Edward Kerrison, 1st Baronet. Arthur Stanhope, 6th Earl Stanhope, and Edward Stanhope were his elder brothers (in contrast to him they were both Conservative Party politicians). Having joined the Royal Navy as a young man, he rose to the rank of lieutenant before he left the service.

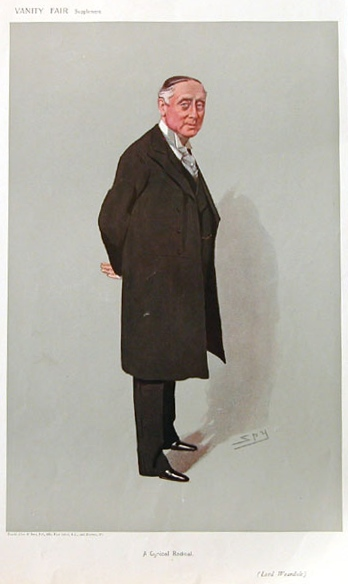
"A Cynical Radical" As depicted by "Spy" (Leslie Ward) in Vanity Fair, 25 July 1906

== Political career ==
In 1886 Stanhope was elected to the House of Commons as the Member of Parliament (MP) for Wednesbury. Having lost his seat in 1892, he was elected again in 1893 for Burnley, a seat he held until 1900. Defeated again, he was elected in 1904 for Harborough, a seat he held until 1906, when he was elevated to the peerage as Baron Weardale, of Stanhope in the County of Durham.

A prominent opponent of war – including the Boer War – he was president of the sixth National Peace Conference in Leicester in 1910, led the British group in the Inter-Parliamentary Union, and became president of that organisation from 1912 to 1922. He was also president of the Save the Children Fund and a trustee of the National Portrait Gallery.

With Lord Curzon, he became in 1912 joint president of the National League for Opposing Woman Suffrage, an anti-suffrage organisation. In 1914 he was attacked with a dogwhip at Euston Station by a suffragette who mistook him for the Prime Minister, H. H. Asquith.

== Personal life ==
Lord Weardale married Countess Alexandra Tolstoy (1856–1934), granddaughter of the German-born Russian Count Georg von Cancrin and widow of Count Tolstoy, a relative of the writer Leo Tolstoy, in 1877. They lived at The Wodehouse near Wombourne, where they entertained William Ewart Gladstone.

In 1906, he built Weardale Manor, a country house on Toys Hill, Brasted Chart, near Sevenoaks in Kent. A substantial house – 145 rooms – it was only occupied during the summer months. He died in Sevenoaks in March 1923, aged 75, and was buried at Chevening. As he had no children the barony became extinct on his death. After his death, Lady Weardale rarely visited Weardale Manor. On her death in 1934, she left it to her nephew, Lord Stanhope. Lacking the funds to maintain it, he allowed it to fall into disrepair and it was demolished in 1939, as were many country houses at that time.

== Arms ==
Coat of arms of Philip Stanhope, 1st Baron Weardale
Coronet A coronet of an Baron Crest A tower azure thereon a demi-lion rampant or, holding between the paws a grenade fired proper. Escutcheon Quarterly ermine and gules, a crescent azure charged with a mullet or for difference. Supporters Dexter: a talbot ermine; Sinister: a lion or, ducally crowned gules; each charged on the shoulder with a mullet issuant from a crescent, both azure, for difference. Motto A deo et rege. (From God and the King)

Parliament of the United Kingdom
Preceded by Wilson Lloyd	Member of Parliament for Wednesbury; 1886–1892	Succeeded by Wilson Lloyd
Preceded by Jabez Balfour	Member of Parliament for Burnley; 1893–1900	Succeeded by William Mitchell
Preceded by Paddy Logan	Member of Parliament for Harborough; 1904–1906	Succeeded by R. C. Lehmann
Peerage of the United Kingdom
New creation	Baron Weardale; 1906–1923	Extinct
