= Burnley (constituency) =

Parliamentary constituency in the United Kingdom, 1868 onwards

Coordinates: 53.787°N 2.245°W

- Borough constituency for the House of Commons
- Interactive map of boundaries since 2024
- Location within North West England
- County: Lancashire
- Population: 87,059 (2011 census)
- Electorate: 75,436 (2023)
- Major settlements: Burnley

Current constituency
- Created: 1868
- Member of Parliament: Oliver Ryan (Labour)
- Seats: One
- Created from: North Lancashire

Burnley is a constituency (Note: A borough constituency (for the purposes of election expenses and type of returning officer)) centred on the town of Burnley in Lancashire which has been represented since 2024 by Oliver Ryan, who is a member of the Labour Party. (Note: As with all constituencies, the constituency elects one Member of Parliament (MP) by the first past the post system of election at least every five years.)

== Constituency profile ==
The Burnley constituency is located in Lancashire. It contains the large town of Burnley and is roughly coterminous with the Borough of Burnley, but also includes the small town of Brierfield from the neighbouring Borough of Pendle. Burnley has an industrial heritage; it was once the largest producer of cotton cloth in the world and also has a history of coal mining

The constituency is in the 5% most-deprived in England. Compared to national averages, residents have low levels of income, education and professional employment, and house prices are very low. White people make up 78% of the population and Asians (predominantly Pakistani) are 20%. Most of the constituency is represented by Reform UK at county council level and by Labour Party and independent councillors at district council level, with some Conservative representation in the rural parts. Voters in Burnley strongly supported leaving the European Union in the 2016 Brexit referendum; an estimated 66% voted in favour of Brexit, placing the Burnley in the top 10% of Brexit-supporting constituencies nationwide.

== History ==
The seat was created in 1868. Except for 1931, it was won by Labour candidates from World War I until 2010, generally on safe, large majorities; Ann Widdecombe failed to take the seat from the Labour Party in 1979. The closest second place was to a Conservative Party candidate, Ian Bruce, who came 787 votes (1.6%) short of taking the seat in 1983.

Burnley saw strong opposition support for the Liberal Democrats in 2005, moving into second place; meanwhile a local independent pushed Yousuf Miah, a Conservative into fourth position. Following controversy regarding outgoing Labour MP Kitty Ussher's personal expenses, Gordon Birtwistle, who first contested the seat in 1992, gained the seat in 2010 with a heavy swing of 9.6%.

However, Birtwistle was one of the many casualties faced by the Liberal Democrats in the 2015 election, losing the seat to Julie Cooper, who had also stood as Labour's candidate in 2010, although the 6.2% swing away from Birtwistle was less than half the 15.2% national swing against his party. As in 2005, the Conservatives came fourth, behind UKIP, as well as Labour and the Lib Dems this time.

At the 2017 election, Labour held the seat with an increased majority. Birtwistle stood again, but saw his share of the vote halved; this was widely seen to be due to his party's stance on Brexit. This election saw one of the biggest increases in the share of the vote for the Conservatives in the whole country, who more than doubled their share of the vote. UKIP lost two-thirds of their vote from 2015, but did retain their deposit. This meant that Burnley was one of the few constituencies in England where four parties retained their deposits.

At the 2019 election, Antony Higginbotham won the seat for the Conservatives, thus becoming the first Conservative to represent Burnley in parliament for over 100 years. The Conservative vote share increased by over 9% compared with the previous election, while the Labour vote share declined by about 10%.

In 2024 Higginbotham's vote halved and the seat was regained for Labour by Oliver Ryan. Gordon Birtwistle, standing in his eighth election for the Liberal Democrats (every election since 1992, except 2001), improved his vote share threefold to come second, relegating the Conservatives to third place.

== Boundaries ==
=== Historic ===
1868–1918: The townships of Burnley, and Habergham Eaves.

1918–1983: The County Borough of Burnley.

1983–1997: The Borough of Burnley.

1997–2024: As 1983 but with redrawn boundaries, due to local government boundary changes in the mid-1980s.

The review of parliamentary representation in Lancashire by the Boundary Commission for England in the 2000s proposed no change to the boundaries of the Burnley seat. The seat remained coterminous with the boundaries of the borough of Burnley (as it has been since 1983; before then, it was coterminous with the county borough of the same name).

=== Current ===
Further to the 2023 review of Westminster constituencies, which came into effect for the 2024 general election, the constituency is composed of the following (as they existed on 1 December 2020):

- The Borough of Burnley
- The Borough of Pendle wards of: Brierfield East & Clover Hill; Brierfield West & Reedley.

Constituency expanded to bring the electorate within the permitted range by transferring the community of Brierfield from the abolished constituency of Pendle.

== Members of Parliament ==
Election	Member	Party
1868	Richard Shaw	Liberal
1876 (by)	Peter Rylands	Liberal
1886	Peter Rylands	Liberal Unionist
1887 (by)	John Slagg	Liberal
1889 (by)	Jabez Balfour	Liberal
1893 (by)	Hon. Philip Stanhope	Liberal
1900	William Mitchell	Conservative
1906	Frederick Maddison	Lib-Lab
Jan 1910	Gerald Arbuthnot	Conservative
Dec 1910	Philip Morrell	Liberal
1918	Dan Irving	Labour
1924 (by)	Arthur Henderson	Labour
1931	Gordon Campbell, VC	National Liberal
1935	Wilfrid Burke	Labour
1959	Dan Jones	Labour
1983	Peter Pike	Labour
2005	Kitty Ussher	Labour
2010	Gordon Birtwistle	Liberal Democrats
2015	Julie Cooper	Labour
2019	Antony Higginbotham	Conservative
2024	Oliver Ryan	Labour Co-op
Feb 2025	Oliver Ryan	Independent
Sep 2025	Oliver Ryan	Labour Co-op

== Elections ==
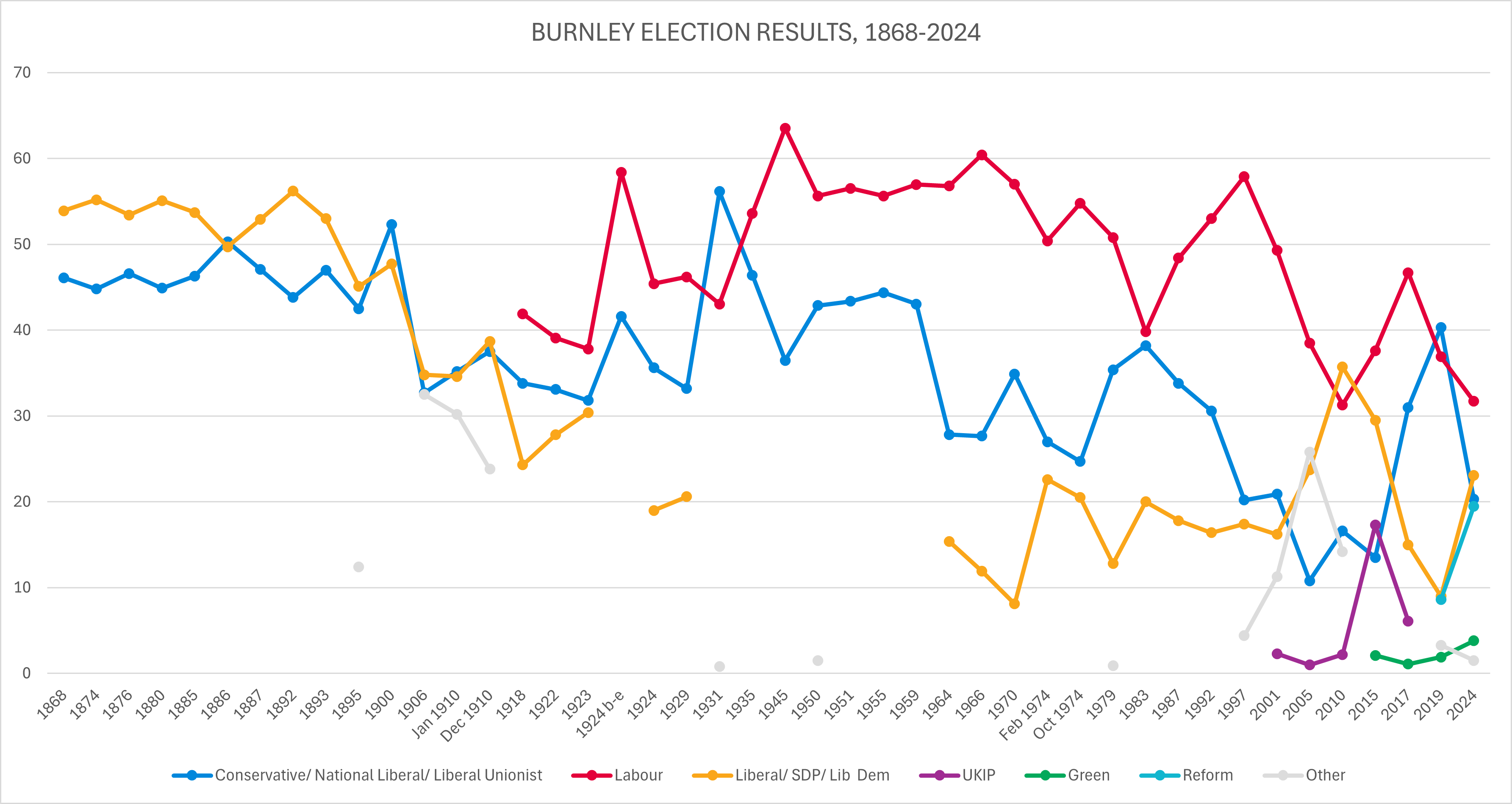
Election results 1868–2024

=== Elections in the 2020s ===
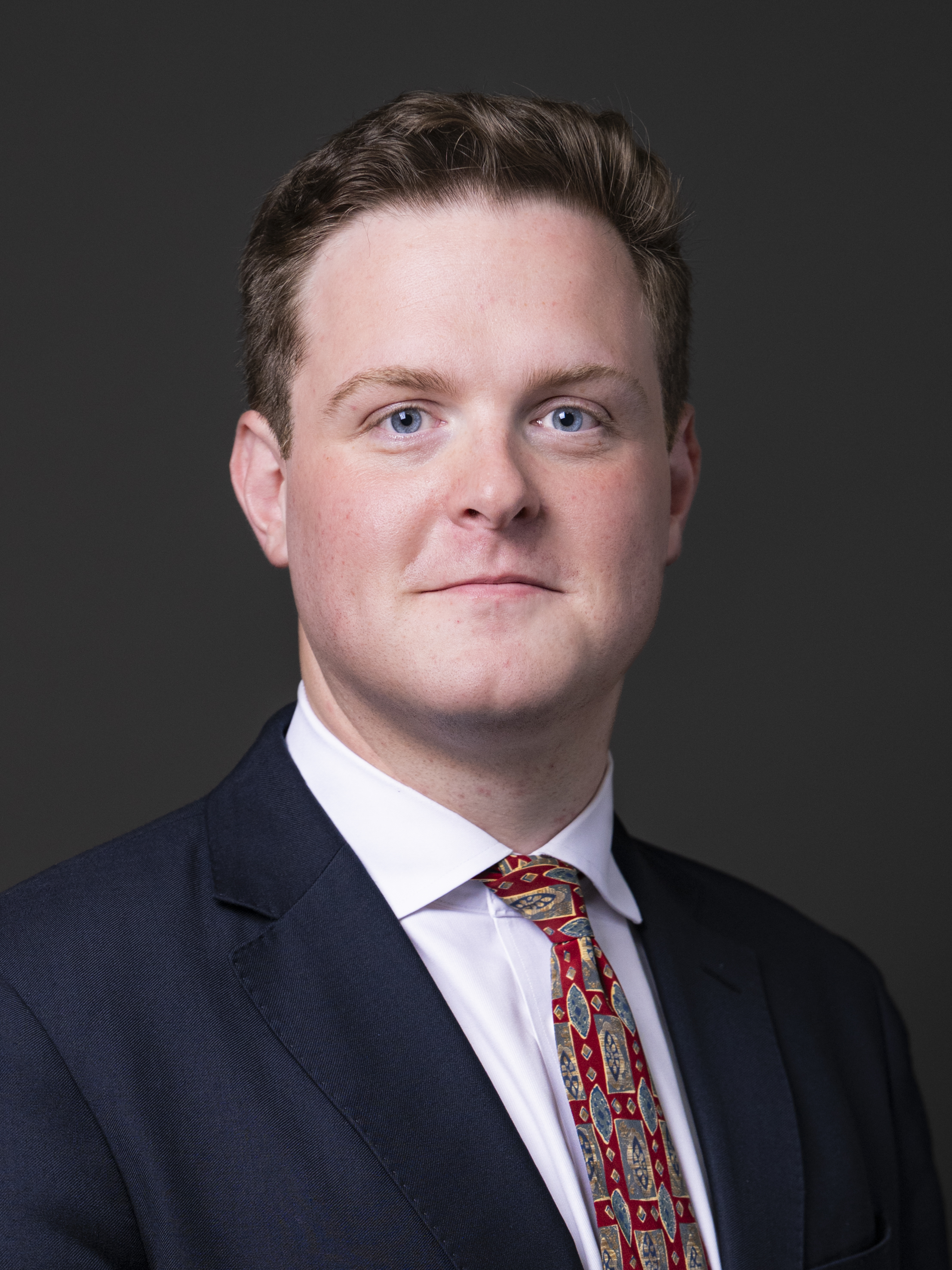
Oliver Ryan

General election 2024: Burnley
Party	Candidate	Votes	%	±%
Labour Co-op	Oliver Ryan	12,598	31.7	−8.5
Liberal Democrats	Gordon Birtwistle	9,178	23.1	+15.4
Conservative	Antony Higginbotham	8,058	20.3	−20.2
Reform	Nathan McCollum	7,755	19.5	+12.4
Green	Jack Launer	1,518	3.8	+2.0
Independent	Rayyan Fiass	292	0.7	New
Independent	Mitchell Cryer	169	0.4	New
Independent	David Roper	151	0.4	New
Majority		3,420	8.6	N/A
Turnout		39,719	53.0	−9.4
Labour gain from Conservative		Swing	+5.8	

=== Elections in the 2010s ===
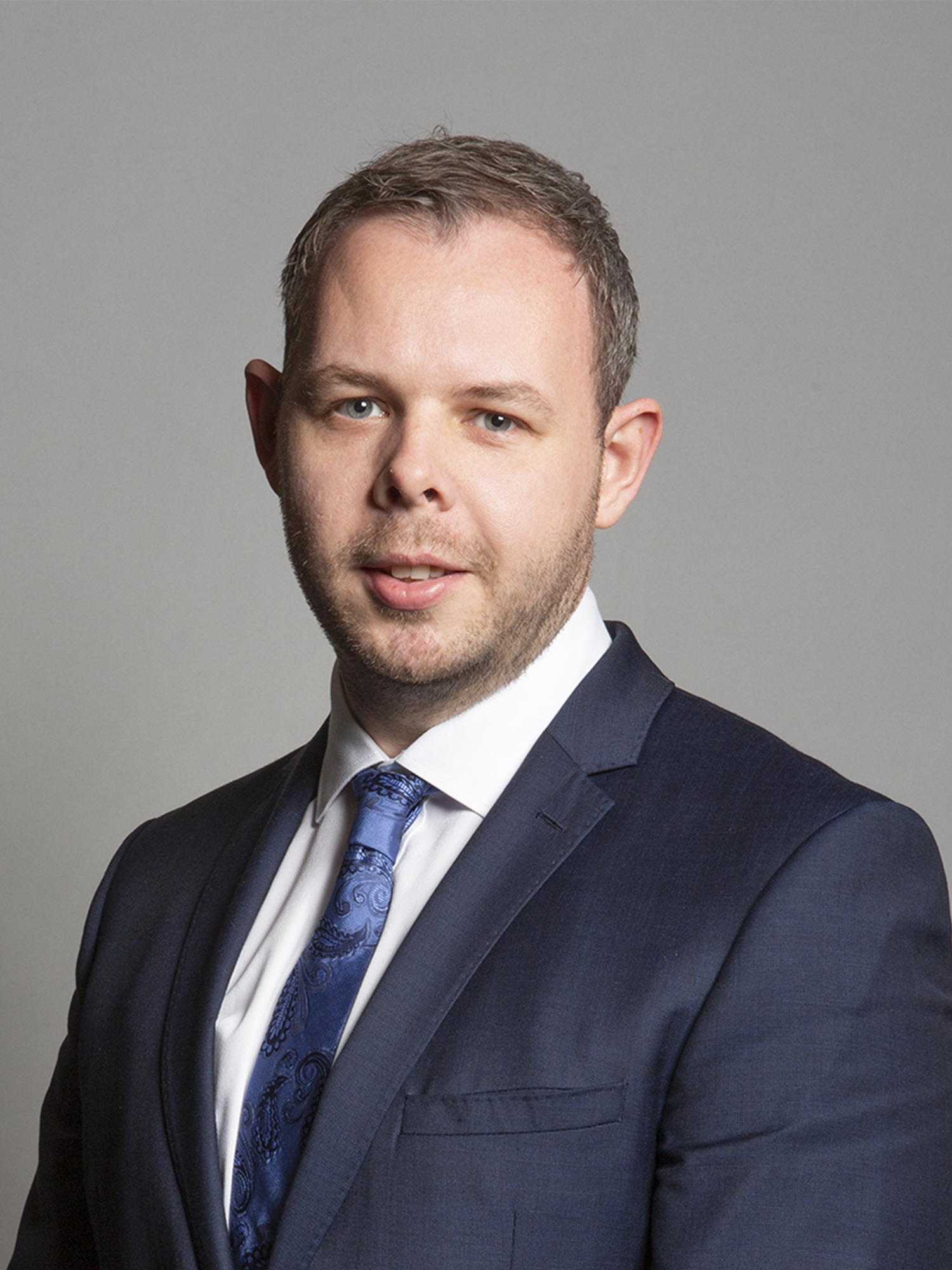
Antony Higginbotham

General election 2019: Burnley
Party	Candidate	Votes	%	±%
Conservative	Antony Higginbotham	15,720	40.3	+9.3
Labour	Julie Cooper	14,368	36.9	−9.8
Liberal Democrats	Gordon Birtwistle	3,501	9.0	−6.0
Brexit Party	Stewart Scott	3,362	8.6	New
BAPIP	Charlie Briggs	1,162	3.0	New
Green	Laura Fisk	739	1.9	+0.8
Independent	Karen Entwistle	132	0.3	New
Majority		1,352	3.4	N/A
Turnout		38,984	60.6	−1.6
Conservative gain from Labour		Swing	+9.5	

General election 2017: Burnley
Party	Candidate	Votes	%	±%
Labour	Julie Cooper	18,832	46.7	+9.1
Conservative	Paul White	12,479	31.0	+17.5
Liberal Democrats	Gordon Birtwistle	6,046	15.0	−14.5
UKIP	Tom Commis	2,472	6.1	−11.2
Green	Laura Fisk	461	1.1	−1.0
Majority		6,353	15.7	+7.6
Turnout		40,290	62.2	+0.6
Labour hold		Swing		

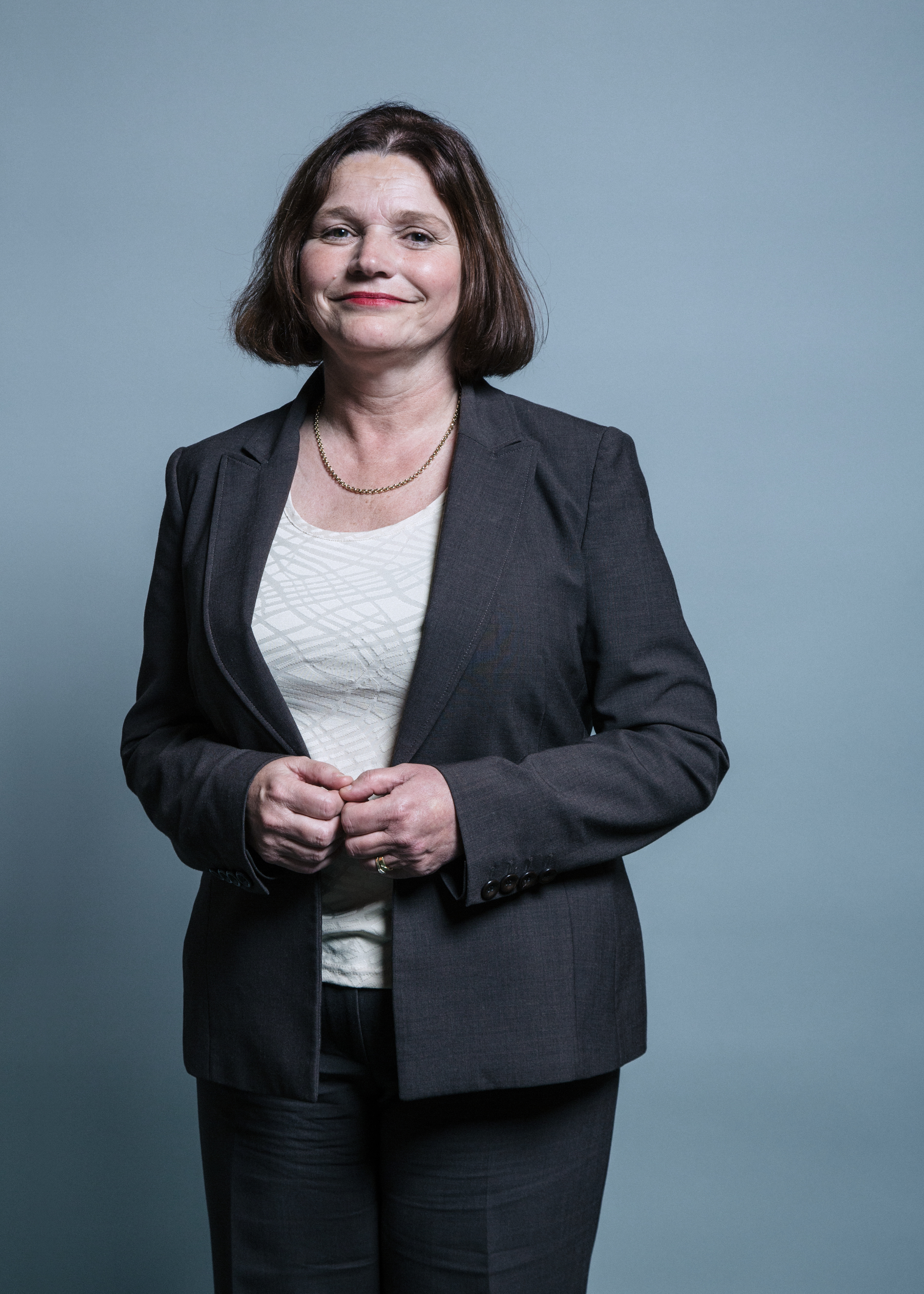
Julie Cooper

General election 2015: Burnley
Party	Candidate	Votes	%	±%
Labour	Julie Cooper	14,951	37.6	+6.3
Liberal Democrats	Gordon Birtwistle	11,707	29.5	−6.2
UKIP	Tom Commis	6,864	17.3	+15.1
Conservative	Sarah Cockburn-Price	5,374	13.5	−3.1
Green	Mike Hargreaves	850	2.1	New
Majority		3,244	8.1	N/A
Turnout		39,746	61.6	−1.2
Labour gain from Liberal Democrats		Swing	+6.3	

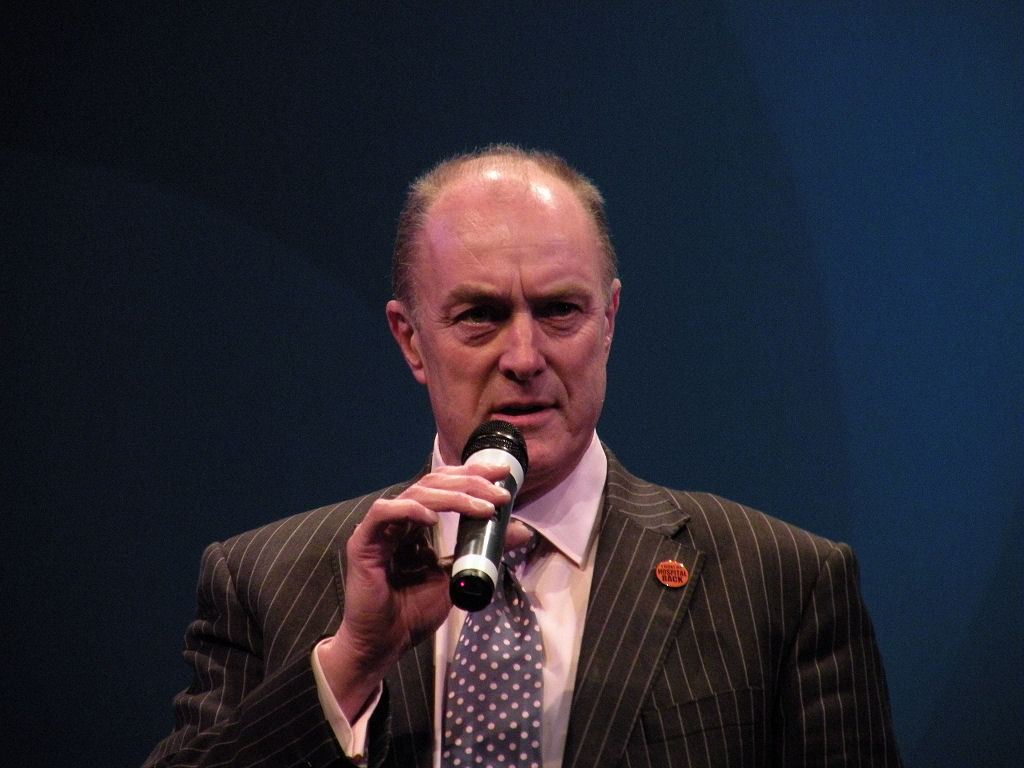
Gordon Birtwistle

General election 2010: Burnley
Party	Candidate	Votes	%	±%
Liberal Democrats	Gordon Birtwistle	14,932	35.7	+12.0
Labour	Julie Cooper	13,114	31.3	−7.2
Conservative	Richard Ali	6,950	16.6	+5.8
BNP	Sharon Wilkinson	3,747	9.0	−1.3
Independent	Andrew Brown	1,876	4.5	New
UKIP	John Wignall	929	2.2	+1.2
Independent	Andrew Hennessey	287	0.7	New
Majority		1,818	4.3	N/A
Turnout		41,845	62.8	+3.6
Liberal Democrats gain from Labour		Swing	+9.6	

=== Elections in the 2000s ===
2010s – 2000s – 1990s – 1980s – 1970s – 1960s – 1950s – 1940s – 1930s – 1920s – 1910s – 1900s – 1890s – 1880s – 1870s – 1860s – Back to Top

Kitty Ussher

General election 2005: Burnley
Party	Candidate	Votes	%	±%
Labour	Kitty Ussher	14,999	38.5	−10.8
Liberal Democrats	Gordon Birtwistle	9,221	23.7	+7.5
Burnley First Independent	Harry Brooks	5,786	14.8	New
Conservative	Yousuf Miah	4,206	10.8	−10.1
BNP	Len Starr	4,003	10.3	−1.0
Independent	Jeff Slater	392	1.0	New
UKIP	Robert McDowell	376	1.0	−1.3
Majority		5,778	14.8	−13.6
Turnout		38,983	59.2	+3.5
Labour hold		Swing	−9.2 (Note: Labour to Liberal Democrat)	

General election 2001: Burnley
Party	Candidate	Votes	%	±%
Labour	Peter Pike	18,195	49.3	−8.6
Conservative	Robert Frost	7,697	20.9	+0.7
Liberal Democrats	Paul Wright	5,975	16.2	−1.2
BNP	Steve Smith	4,151	11.3	New
UKIP	Richard Buttrey	866	2.3	New
Majority		10,498	28.4	−9.3
Turnout		36,884	55.7	−11.2
Labour hold		Swing	−4.6	

=== Elections in the 1990s ===
2010s – 2000s – 1990s – 1980s – 1970s – 1960s – 1950s – 1940s – 1930s – 1920s – 1910s – 1900s – 1890s – 1880s – 1870s – 1860s – Back to Top

General election 1997: Burnley
Party	Candidate	Votes	%	±%
Labour	Peter Pike	26,210	57.9	+4.9
Conservative	Bill Wiggin	9,148	20.2	−10.4
Liberal Democrats	Gordon Birtwistle	7,877	17.4	+1.0
Referendum	Richard Oakley	2,010	4.4	New
Majority		17,062	37.7	+15.3
Turnout		45,245	66.9	−7.3
Labour hold		Swing	+7.65	

General election 1992: Burnley
Party	Candidate	Votes	%	±%
Labour	Peter Pike	27,184	53.0	+4.6
Conservative	Brenda Binge	15,693	30.6	−3.2
Liberal Democrats	Gordon Birtwistle	8,414	16.4	−1.4
Majority		11,491	22.4	+7.8
Turnout		51,291	74.2	−4.6
Labour hold		Swing	+3.9	

=== Elections in the 1980s ===
2010s – 2000s – 1990s – 1980s – 1970s – 1960s – 1950s – 1940s – 1930s – 1920s – 1910s – 1900s – 1890s – 1880s – 1870s – 1860s – Back to Top

General election 1987: Burnley
Party	Candidate	Votes	%	±%
Labour	Peter Pike	25,140	48.4	+8.6
Conservative	Harold Elletson	17,583	33.8	−4.4
SDP	Ronals Baker	9,241	17.8	−2.2
Majority		7,557	14.6	+13.0
Turnout		51,964	78.8	+2.5
Labour hold		Swing	+6.5	

General election 1983: Burnley
Party	Candidate	Votes	%	±%
Labour	Peter Pike	20,178	39.8	−11.0
Conservative	Ian Bruce	19,391	38.2	+2.8
Liberal	Michael Steed	11,191	20.0	+7.2
Majority		787	1.6	−13.8
Turnout		50,760	76.3	
Labour hold		Swing	−6.9	

=== Elections in the 1970s ===
2010s – 2000s – 1990s – 1980s – 1970s – 1960s – 1950s – 1940s – 1930s – 1920s – 1910s – 1900s – 1890s – 1880s – 1870s – 1860s – Back to Top

General election 1979: Burnley
Party	Candidate	Votes	%	±%
Labour	Dan Jones	20,172	50.8	−4.0
Conservative	Ann Widdecombe	14,062	35.4	+10.7
Liberal	Michael Steed	5,091	12.8	−7.7
Independent Democrat	F. Tyrrall	352	0.9	New
Majority		6,110	15.4	−14.7
Turnout		39,677		
Labour hold		Swing		

General election October 1974: Burnley
Party	Candidate	Votes	%	±%
Labour	Dan Jones	21,642	54.8	+4.4
Conservative	A. Pickup	9,766	24.7	−2.3
Liberal	S.P. Mews	8,119	20.5	−2.1
Majority		11,876	30.1	+6.7
Turnout		39,527	79.7	0.0
Labour hold		Swing	+3.3	

General election February 1974: Burnley
Party	Candidate	Votes	%	±%
Labour	Dan Jones	21,108	50.4	−6.6
Conservative	A. Pickup	11,268	27.0	−7.9
Liberal	S. Mews	9,471	22.6	+14.5
Majority		9,840	23.4	+1.3
Turnout		41,847	79.7	+4.0
Labour hold		Swing		

General election 1970: Burnley
Party	Candidate	Votes	%	±%
Labour	Dan Jones	24,200	57.0	−3.4
Conservative	John Birch	14,846	34.9	+7.2
Liberal	George Brownbill	3,446	8.11	−3.8
Majority		9,354	22.1	−10.7
Turnout		39,046	75.7	−4.3
Labour hold		Swing		

=== Elections in the 1960s ===
2010s – 2000s – 1990s – 1980s – 1970s – 1960s – 1950s – 1940s – 1930s – 1920s – 1910s – 1900s – 1890s – 1880s – 1870s – 1860s – Back to Top

General election 1966: Burnley
Party	Candidate	Votes	%	±%
Labour	Dan Jones	25,583	60.43	
Conservative	Albert S Royse	11,710	27.66	
Liberal	Mary R Mason	5,045	11.92	
Majority		13,873	32.77	
Turnout		42,338	79.96	
Labour hold		Swing		

General election 1964: Burnley
Party	Candidate	Votes	%	±%
Labour	Dan Jones	25,244	56.80	
Conservative	Tom Mitchell	12,365	27.82	
Liberal	Mary R Mason	6,833	15.38	New
Majority		12,879	28.98	
Turnout		44,442	81.68	
Labour hold		Swing		

=== Elections in the 1950s ===
2010s – 2000s – 1990s – 1980s – 1970s – 1960s – 1950s – 1940s – 1930s – 1920s – 1910s – 1900s – 1890s – 1880s – 1870s – 1860s – Back to Top

General election 1959: Burnley
Party	Candidate	Votes	%	±%
Labour	Dan Jones	27,675	56.97	
Conservative	Edward Brooks	20,902	43.03	
Majority		6,773	13.94	
Turnout		48,577	83.77	
Labour hold		Swing		

General election 1955: Burnley
Party	Candidate	Votes	%	±%
Labour	Wilfrid Burke	27,865	55.63	
Conservative	Edward Brooks	22,229	44.37	
Majority		5,636	11.26	
Turnout		50,094	83.46	
Labour hold		Swing		

General election 1951: Burnley
Party	Candidate	Votes	%	±%
Labour	Wilfrid Burke	31,261	56.53	
Conservative	Donald P Dunkley	24,034	43.37	
Majority		7,227	13.16	
Turnout		55,295	88.86	
Labour hold		Swing		

General election 1950: Burnley
Party	Candidate	Votes	%	±%
Labour	Wilfrid Burke	30,685	55.65	
Conservative	F.H. Wilson	23,636	42.86	
Communist	Bill Whittaker	526	0.95	New
Ind. Labour Party	Dan Carradice	295	0.53	New
Majority		7,049	12.79	
Turnout		55,142	89.56	
Labour hold		Swing		

=== Election in the 1940s ===
2010s – 2000s – 1990s – 1980s – 1970s – 1960s – 1950s – 1940s – 1930s – 1920s – 1910s – 1900s – 1890s – 1880s – 1870s – 1860s – Back to Top

General election 1945: Burnley
Party	Candidate	Votes	%	±%
Labour	Wilfrid Burke	32,122	63.54	
National Liberal	Herbert Monckton Milnes	18,431	36.46	
Majority		13,691	27.08	
Turnout		50,553	80.44	
Labour hold		Swing		

=== Elections in the 1930s ===
2010s – 2000s – 1990s – 1980s – 1970s – 1960s – 1950s – 1940s – 1930s – 1920s – 1910s – 1900s – 1890s – 1880s – 1870s – 1860s – Back to Top

General election 1935: Burnley
Party	Candidate	Votes	%	±%
Labour	Wilfrid Burke	31,160	53.61	
National Liberal	Gordon Campbell	26,965	46.39	
Majority		4,195	7.22	N/A
Turnout		58,125	87.36	
Labour gain from National Liberal		Swing		

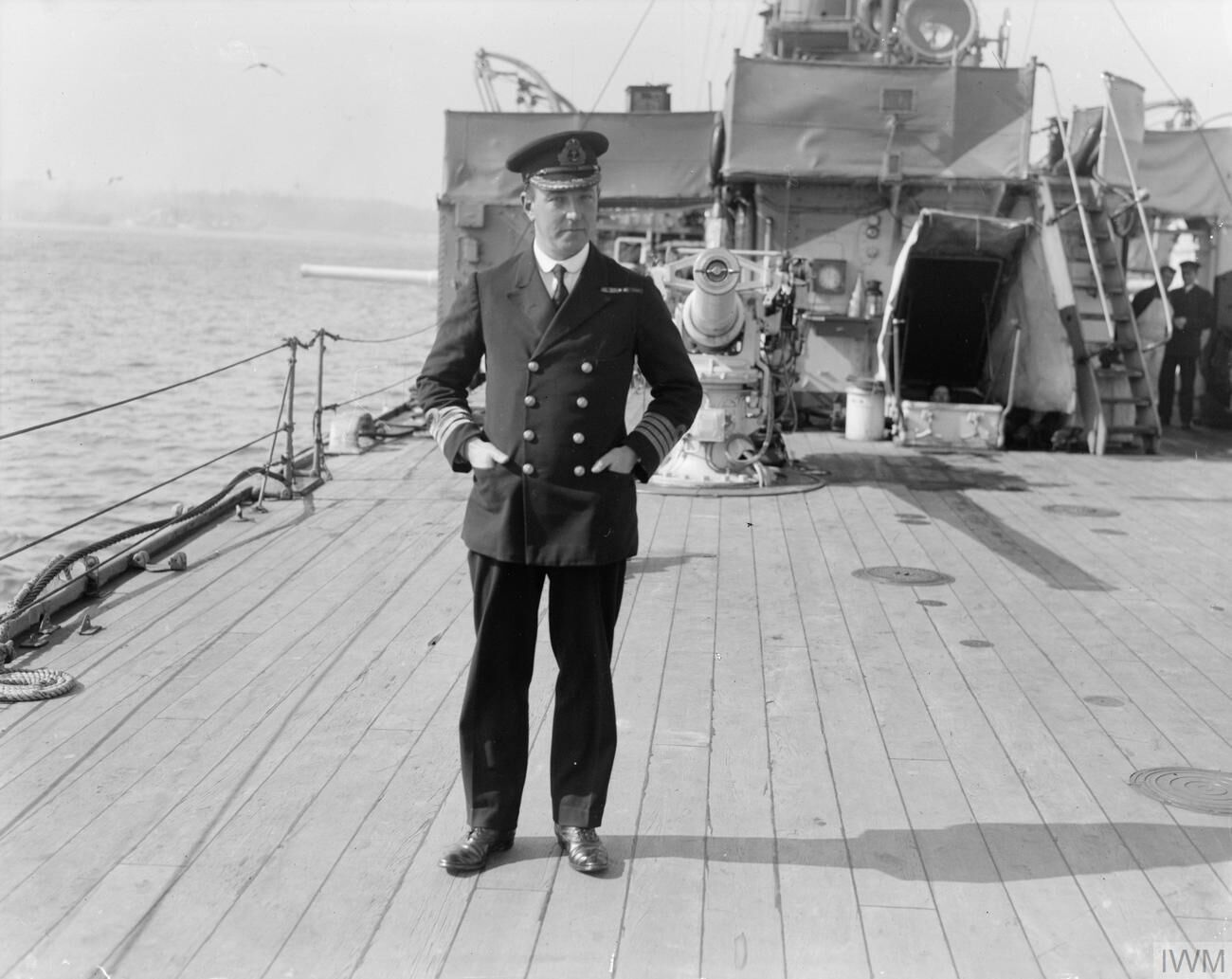
Gordon Campbell VC

General election 1931: Burnley
Party	Candidate	Votes	%	±%
National	Gordon Campbell	35,126	56.15	
Labour	Arthur Henderson	26,917	43.03	
Communist	J. Rushton	512	0.82	New
Majority		8,209	13.12	N/A
Turnout		62,555	91.85	
National gain from Labour		Swing		

=== Elections in the 1920s ===
2010s – 2000s – 1990s – 1980s – 1970s – 1960s – 1950s – 1940s – 1930s – 1920s – 1910s – 1900s – 1890s – 1880s – 1870s – 1860s – Back to Top

General election 1929: Burnley
Party	Candidate	Votes	%	±%
Labour	Arthur Henderson	28,091	46.2	+0.8
Unionist	Ian Fairbairn	20,137	33.2	−2.4
Liberal	Aneurin Edwards	12,502	20.6	+1.6
Majority		7,954	13.0	+3.2
Turnout		60,730	89.6	+1.2
Registered electors		67,781		
Labour hold		Swing	+1.6	

General election 1924: Burnley
Party	Candidate	Votes	%	±%
Labour	Arthur Henderson	20,549	45.4	+7.6
Unionist	Ian Fairbairn	16,084	35.6	+3.8
Liberal	James Whitehead	8,601	19.0	−11.4
Majority		4,465	9.8	+3.8
Turnout		45,954	88.4	+1.1
Registered electors		51,162		
Labour hold		Swing	+1.9	

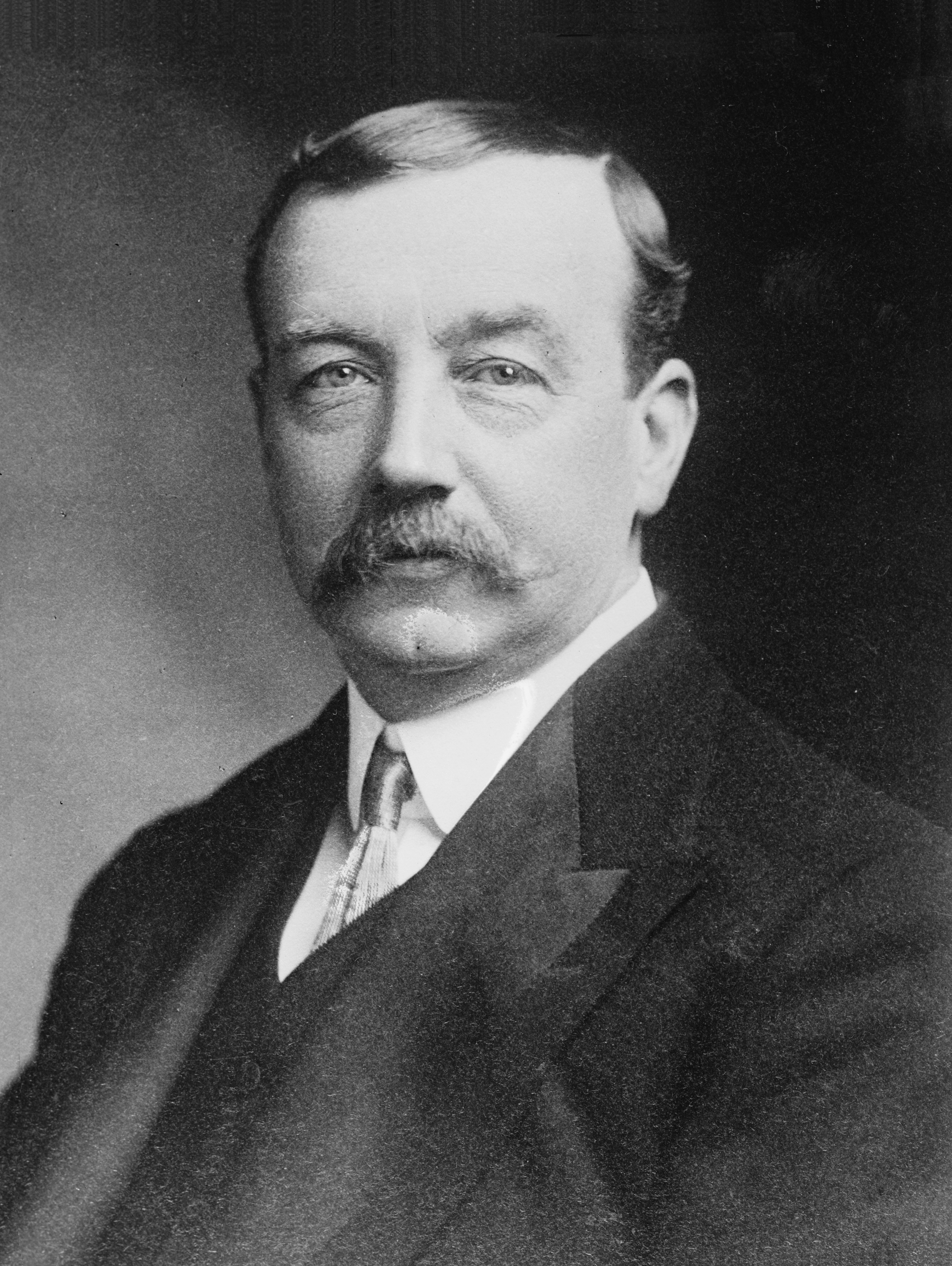
Arthur Henderson

1924 Burnley by-election
Party	Candidate	Votes	%	±%
Labour	Arthur Henderson	24,571	58.4	+20.6
Conservative	Harold Edward Joscelyn Camps	17,534	41.6	+9.8
Majority		7,037	16.8	+10.8
Turnout		42,105	82.4	−4.9
Registered electors		51,086		
Labour hold		Swing	+5.4	

General election 1923: Burnley
Party	Candidate	Votes	%	±%
Labour	Dan Irving	16,848	37.8	−1.3
Unionist	Harold Edward Joscelyn Camps	14,197	31.8	−1.3
Liberal	James Whitehead	13,543	30.4	+2.6
Majority		2,651	6.0	0.0
Turnout		44,588	87.3	−1.4
Registered electors		51,086		
Labour hold		Swing	0.0	

General election 1922: Burnley
Party	Candidate	Votes	%	±%
Labour	Dan Irving	17,385	39.1	−2.8
Unionist	Harold Edward Joscelyn Camps	14,731	33.1	−0.7
Liberal	Walter Layton	12,339	27.8	+3.5
Majority		2,654	6.0	−2.1
Turnout		44,455	88.7	+17.3
Registered electors		50,111		
Labour hold		Swing	−1.1	

=== Elections in the 1910s ===
2010s – 2000s – 1990s – 1980s – 1970s – 1960s – 1950s – 1940s – 1930s – 1920s – 1910s – 1900s – 1890s – 1880s – 1870s – 1860s – Back to Top

Dan Irving

General election December 1918: Burnley
Party		Candidate	Votes	%	±%
	Labour	Dan Irving	15,217	41.9	New
C	Unionist	Henry Mulholland	12,289	33.8	−3.7
	Liberal	John Howarth Grey	8,825	24.3	−14.3
Majority			2,928	8.1	N/A
Turnout			21,114	71.4	−22.7
	Labour gain from Liberal		Swing	+16.2	
C indicates candidate endorsed by the coalition government.

A General Election was due to take place by the end of 1915. By the summer of 1914, the following candidates had been adopted to contest that election. Due to the outbreak of war, the election never took place.

- British Socialist Party: Dan Irving

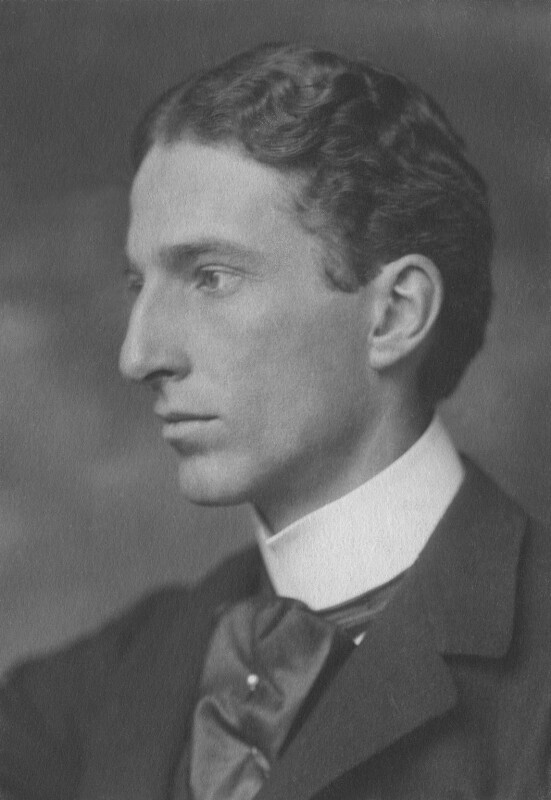
Philip Morrell

General election December 1910: Burnley
Party	Candidate	Votes	%	±%
Liberal	Philip Morrell	6,177	38.7	+4.1
Conservative	Gerald Arbuthnot	6,004	37.5	+2.3
Social Democratic Federation	Henry Hyndman	3,810	23.8	−6.4
Majority		173	1.2	N/A
Turnout		15,991	94.1	−2.4
Registered electors		16,992		
Liberal gain from Conservative		Swing	+0.9	

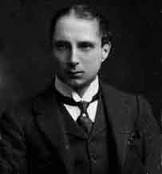
Gerald Arbuthnot

General election January 1910: Burnley
Party	Candidate	Votes	%	±%
Conservative	Gerald Arbuthnot	5,776	35.2	+2.5
Lib-Lab	Fred Maddison	5,681	34.6	−0.2
Social Democratic Federation	Henry Hyndman	4,948	30.2	−2.3
Majority		95	0.6	N/A
Turnout		16,405	96.5	+1.5
Registered electors		16,992		
Conservative gain from Lib-Lab		Swing	+1.4	

=== Elections in the 1900s ===
2010s – 2000s – 1990s – 1980s – 1970s – 1960s – 1950s – 1940s – 1930s – 1920s – 1910s – 1900s – 1890s – 1880s – 1870s – 1860s – Back to Top

Fred Maddison

General election 1906: Burnley
Party	Candidate	Votes	%	±%
Lib-Lab	Fred Maddison	5,288	34.8	−12.9
Conservative	Gerald Arbuthnot	4,964	32.7	−19.6
Social Democratic Federation	Henry Hyndman	4,932	32.5	New
Majority		324	2.1	N/A
Turnout		15,184	95.0	+5.1
Registered electors		15,983		
Lib-Lab gain from Conservative		Swing	+3.4	

General election 1900: Burnley
Party	Candidate	Votes	%	±%
Conservative	William Mitchell	6,773	52.3	+9.8
Liberal	Philip Stanhope	6,173	47.7	+2.6
Majority		600	4.6	N/A
Turnout		12,946	89.9	−0.6
Registered electors		14,393		
Conservative gain from Liberal		Swing	+3.6	

=== Elections in the 1890s ===
2010s – 2000s – 1990s – 1980s – 1970s – 1960s – 1950s – 1940s – 1930s – 1920s – 1910s – 1900s – 1890s – 1880s – 1870s – 1860s – Back to Top

General election 1895: Burnley
Party	Candidate	Votes	%	±%
Liberal	Philip Stanhope	5,454	45.1	−11.1
Conservative	William Alexander Lindsay	5,133	42.5	−1.3
Social Democratic Federation	Henry Hyndman	1,498	12.4	New
Majority		321	2.6	−9.8
Turnout		12,085	90.5	−0.5
Registered electors		13,360		
Liberal hold		Swing	−4.9	

Philip Stanhope

1893 Burnley by-election
Party	Candidate	Votes	%	±%
Liberal	Philip Stanhope	6,199	53.0	−3.2
Conservative	William Alexander Lindsay	5,506	47.0	+3.2
Majority		693	6.0	−6.4
Turnout		11,705	91.3	+0.3
Registered electors		12,826		
Liberal hold		Swing	−3.2	

General election 1892: Burnley
Party	Candidate	Votes	%	±%
Liberal	Jabez Balfour	6,450	56.2	+6.5
Liberal Unionist	Edwin Lawrence	5,035	43.8	−6.5
Majority		1,415	12.4	N/A
Turnout		11,485	91.0	+4.1
Registered electors		12,619		
Liberal gain from Liberal Unionist		Swing	+6.5	

=== Elections in the 1880s ===
2010s – 2000s – 1990s – 1980s – 1970s – 1960s – 1950s – 1940s – 1930s – 1920s – 1910s – 1900s – 1890s – 1880s – 1870s – 1860s – Back to Top

By-election, 27 Feb 1889: Burnley
Party	Candidate	Votes	%	±%
Liberal	Jabez Balfour	Unopposed		
Liberal gain from Liberal Unionist				

- Caused by Stagg's death.

By-election, 19 Feb 1887: Burnley
Party	Candidate	Votes	%	±%
Liberal	John Slagg	5,026	52.9	+3.2
Conservative	John Thursby	4,481	47.1	−3.2
Majority		545	5.8	N/A
Turnout		9,507	94.9	+8.0
Registered electors		10,020		
Liberal gain from Liberal Unionist		Swing	+3.2	

- Caused by Ryland's death.

General election 1886: Burnley
Party	Candidate	Votes	%	±%
Liberal Unionist	Peter Rylands	4,209	50.3	+4.0
Liberal	James Greenwood	4,166	49.7	−4.0
Majority		43	0.6	N/A
Turnout		8,375	86.9	−7.2
Registered electors		9,638		
Liberal Unionist gain from Liberal		Swing	+4.0	

General election 1885: Burnley
Party	Candidate	Votes	%	±%
Liberal	Peter Rylands	4,866	53.7	−1.4
Conservative	Henry Herbert Wainwright	4,199	46.3	+1.4
Majority		667	7.4	−2.8
Turnout		9,065	94.1	+0.1
Registered electors		9,638		
Liberal hold		Swing	−1.4	

General election 1880: Burnley
Party	Candidate	Votes	%	±%
Liberal	Peter Rylands	3,943	55.1	−0.1
Conservative	Edmund Talbot	3,217	44.9	+0.1
Majority		726	10.2	−0.2
Turnout		7,160	94.0	+9.9
Registered electors		7,614		
Liberal hold		Swing	−0.1	

=== Elections in the 1870s ===
2010s – 2000s – 1990s – 1980s – 1970s – 1960s – 1950s – 1940s – 1930s – 1920s – 1910s – 1900s – 1890s – 1880s – 1870s – 1860s – Back to Top

By-election, 14 Feb 1876: Burnley
Party	Candidate	Votes	%	±%
Liberal	Peter Rylands	3,520	53.4	−1.8
Conservative	William Alexander Lindsay	3,077	46.6	+1.8
Majority		433	6.8	−3.6
Turnout		6,597	92.6	+8.5
Registered electors		7,127		
Liberal hold		Swing	−1.8	

- Caused by Shaw's death.

General election 1874: Burnley
Party	Candidate	Votes	%	±%
Liberal	Richard Shaw	3,065	55.2	+1.3
Conservative	William Alexander Lindsay	2,490	44.8	−1.3
Majority		575	10.4	+2.6
Turnout		5,555	84.1	+8.4
Registered electors		6,607		
Liberal hold		Swing	+1.3	

=== Elections in the 1860s ===
2010s – 2000s – 1990s – 1980s – 1970s – 1960s – 1950s – 1940s – 1930s – 1920s – 1910s – 1900s – 1890s – 1880s – 1870s – 1860s – Back to Top

General election 1868: Burnley
Party	Candidate	Votes	%
Liberal	Richard Shaw	2,620	53.9
Conservative	James Yorke Scarlett	2,238	46.1
Majority		382	7.8
Turnout		4,858	75.7
Registered electors		6,417	
Liberal win (new seat)			

== See also ==
- List of parliamentary constituencies in Lancashire
