= 1876 Burnley by-election =

UK Parliamentary by-election

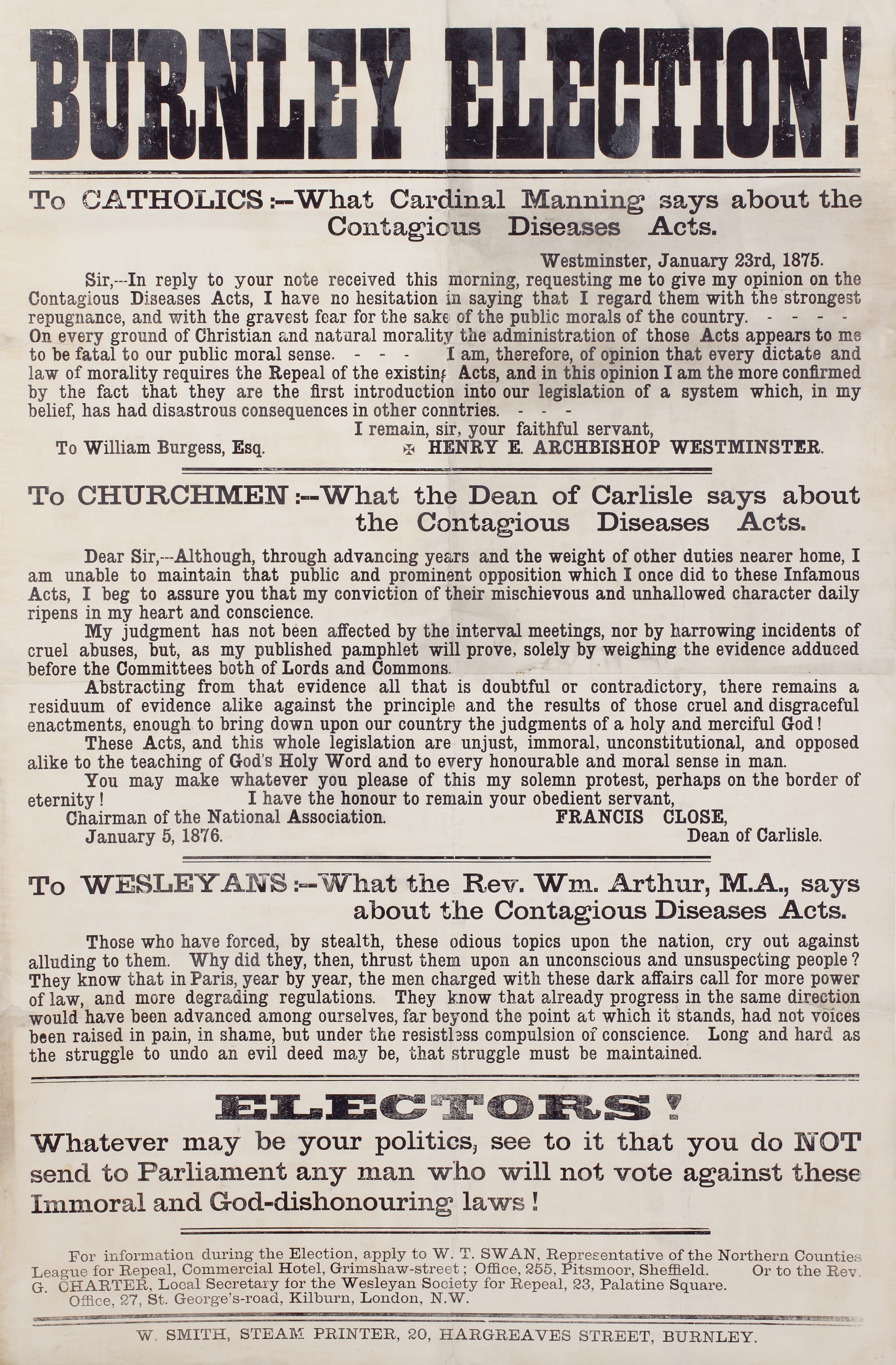
Poster printed during the 1876 Burnley by-election campaign, calling for the repeal of the Contagious Diseases Acts

The 1876 Burnley by-election was held on 12 February 1876. The by-election was fought due to the death of the incumbent Liberal MP, Richard Shaw. It was won by the Liberal candidate Peter Rylands.

Burnley by-election, 1876
Party	Candidate	Votes	%	±%
Liberal	Peter Rylands	3,520	53.4	−1.8
Conservative	William Alexander Lindsay	3,077	46.6	+1.8
Majority		433	6.8	−4.0
Turnout		6,597	92.6	+8.5
Registered electors		7,127		
Liberal hold		Swing	−1.8	
