= Herman Witsius Ryland =

English colonial official (1760-1838)

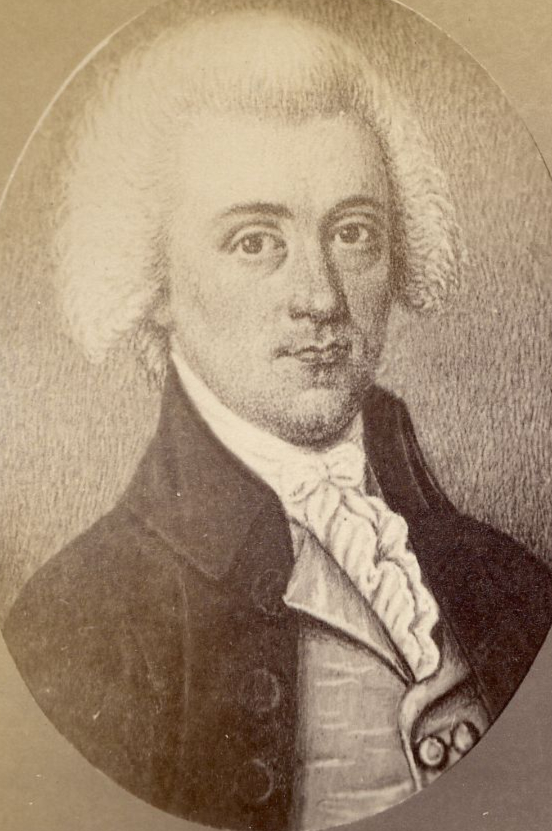
Herman W Ryland

Herman Witsius Ryland (1760–1838) was an English colonial official, known as an influential administrator in Canada.

== Life ==
Born at Northampton, he was the younger son of John Collett Ryland, and brother of John Ryland (1753–1825). He was educated for the army, and in 1781 was assistant deputy-paymaster-general to the forces under Burgoyne and Cornwallis in America, serving at New York before to its final evacuation in 1782.

Ryland returned to England with Sir Guy Carleton, who had negotiated the peace. In 1793 Lord Dorchester, as Carleton had become, was appointed governor-in-chief of British North America, and took Ryland with him to Canada as his civil secretary. Ryland took a major part in the administration of affairs in Lower Canada. He continued as secretary under Dorchester's successor, General Robert Prescott, in 1797, and again (after serving with Sir Robert Miles, the lieutenant-governor) under Sir James Craig on 22 October 1807. He became also clerk of the executive council, clerk of the crown in chancery, and treasurer for the Jesuits' estates; and he received a pension for his services before 1804.

Ryland aimed to establish in Canada the supremacy of the Crown and the Church of England, and to anglicise the French Canadians. He opposed Archbishop Joseph Octave Plessis; and advised the closure of the reactionary press in March 1810. Soon afterwards he was sent to England on a special mission, to obtain an alteration of the constitution of Lower Canada, to appropriate to the Crown the revenues of the Jesuits' estates, and to induce the government to take over patronage of the Roman Catholic Bishop of Quebec. On 31 July 1810 he arrived at Plymouth, and was in a meeting of the cabinet on the subject of his mission on 22 August; but he returned unsuccessfully to Canada, arriving at Quebec on 19 August 1812.

Meanwhile Sir James Craig had retired, and Sir George Prevost had taken his place. The new governor did not approve Ryland's views, and, though Ryland came back with a recommendation from Lord Liverpool, and a seat in the legislative council, he did not retain his old position of secretary more than a few months, resigning in April 1813. From this point Ryland's influence was mainly in the legislative council; but after 1820 he appeared little in public life.

Ryland died at his seat, Beauport, near Quebec, on 20 July 1838.

== Family ==
Ryland was married, and left children who settled in Canada. A son, George Herman Ryland (d. 24 September 1883), was clerk of the legislative council.

== Notes ==
Attribution

This article incorporates text from a publication now in the public domain: Lee, Sidney, ed. (1897). "Ryland, Herman Witsius". Dictionary of National Biography. Vol. 50. London: Smith, Elder & Co.
