= Wilfrid Burke =

British politician (1889–1968)

Burke in 1946.

Wilfrid Andrew Burke (23 November 1889 – 18 July 1968) was a British Trade union organiser and politician who achieved high office in the Labour Party and served as Member of Parliament (MP) for Burnley for 24 years. He was briefly in the Attlee government as Assistant Postmaster-General. After leaving the government he concentrated on party work, fighting Bevanites and serving as Chairman of the National Executive Committee.

== Early life ==
Burke was born in Liverpool, and went to Oulton College in the city. Burke then trained as a teacher and worked as such for several years, before going into commerce in Manchester in 1918. At the same time he joined the National Union of Distributive and Allied Workers, which later became the Union of Shop, Distributive and Allied Workers.

== Manchester politics ==
In 1920, Burke became Manchester area organiser for the union. His branch was a large one and Burke obtained its strong support, which saw him elected to the executive council of the Labour Party in Manchester; there he was helped by his work in his spare time campaigning for the party. At the 1924 general election, Burke was the Labour candidate for Manchester Blackley; the seat was held by Philip Oliver for the Liberal Party. Burke ended up coming narrowly third as Oliver lost the seat to the Conservative Party. Burke was thought to have polled well.

Burke was readopted as Labour candidate for the seat in March 1925. Before the 1929 general election came, he had fought several municipal elections. The contest was assessed by The Times as turning on the extent to which Labour encroached on the Liberal vote. Despite his campaigning experience Burke remained in third place, and Oliver regained his seat by 888 votes. Burke stood again in the 1931 general election, but was heavily defeated.

== Member of Parliament for Burnley ==
In October 1932, Burke was adopted as Labour Party candidate for Burnley, a constituency which had up until 1931 by party leader Arthur Henderson. The sitting member who had beaten Henderson was Vice-Admiral Gordon Campbell VC, a First World War hero elected as a 'National' candidate and not a Conservative; Campbell decided to stand as a Liberal National but was still reckoned to have a difficult fight. After a tough fight Burke won by 4,195 votes.

=== Textile industry ===
Burnley was based on the textile industry and Burke concentrated on this subject when he arrived in Parliament. He was appointed to the Standing Committee considering the Cotton Spinning Industry Bill in 1936. He referred to the Lancashire saying "clogs to clogs in three generations", and asked for the appointments to the advisory committee under the Act to include textile workers rather than factory owners. He spoke in an all-night debate on unemployment assistance regulations in July 1936, blaming increased unemployment in Burnley on the National government's destroying the market for textiles in India.

In November 1936, referring to a speech by Sir Arnold Wilson praising Germany, Burke expressed his disappointment and dismay at "growing appreciation of the totalitarian state" by Conservative MPs. He launched a debate on location of industry later that month, calling for new industries to be diverted from London to areas of high unemployment. Burke regularly called for moves to preserve steady trade with overseas markets for Lancashire textiles, as when he argued in March 1939 in support of a Government Bill to create a fund to stabilise the exchange rate between Britain and China during the Second Sino-Japanese War; other Labour MPs had moved the rejection of the Bill.

=== Labour whip ===
Burke played an active part in a joint committee of Cotton Trade organisations which was set up in advance of legislation to reorganise the industry in the late 1930s. When the proposals gathered the support of two-thirds of the industry, Burke told a luncheon in January 1939 that they should confidently expect Government action. He spoke in favour of the Bill when it was introduced in March. Burke was appointed as a Whip for the Labour Party in 1941; however he voted against the Government's proposal to delay the implementation of the Beveridge Report in February 1943, and was replaced in October of that year.

== Labour Party National Executive ==
At the Labour Party conference in June 1943 Burke moved a resolution on behalf of his union, calling for an adequate rate of the old age pension. The resolution was carried. He was a member of the executive of the newly formed Anglo-French Inter-Parliamentary Committee in October 1944, and having been sponsored by the shopworkers' union to be a member of the National Executive Committee of the Labour Party from 1944, in August 1945 he was one of three fraternal delegates representing the Labour Party at the conference of the French Socialist Party. He was a member of many more international delegations during his time on the National Executive.

== Assistant Postmaster-General ==
Burke had an easy re-election at the 1945 general election, his result being one of the first to be announced. On 10 August he was appointed by new Prime Minister Clement Attlee as Assistant Postmaster-General, being the spokesman for his department in the House of Commons as the Postmaster-General was the Earl of Listowel.

In office, Burke's main job was to return the Royal Mail and the General Post Office (including the telephone system) to its pre-war function of serving civilian life, including reintroducing some services closed to aid the war effort. In March 1946 Burke and Listowel were able to announce the opening of several schemes to improve the service. Pressure was put on Burke by the Union of Post Office Workers and the Post Office Engineering Union to include Cable & Wireless in the Government's programme of nationalisation, pressure which was ultimately successful. The department expanded in spring 1946 when the Ministry of Information was abolished, and Burke announced the commencement of BBC radio broadcasts in Russian.

Despite progress made, Burke was unable to allow the resumption of the special 'Greetings Telegram' service in November 1946. The Post Office made a substantial profit of £36,191,000 in 1945–46, leading to a move by opposition MPs to lower charges. Burke was caught up in a minor diplomatic spat in April 1947 over BBC speeches by Henry A. Wallace criticising the United States Government; he insisted that the British Government did not intervene over the subject of talks, and received the support of his own side. Burke left office in October 1947.

== Dissenting votes ==
Out of office Burke retained his membership of the National Executive Committee, but began to dissent from some of the Government's legislation. In December 1948 he opposed the Licensing Bill, along with two other Labour MPs; and he supported a Liberal Party motion for a Royal Commission into war pensions in April 1949. At the 1950 general election, in addition to a Conservative Party candidate (their first in the division since 1929), he also faced nominees from the Communist Party of Great Britain and the Independent Labour Party. Burke won re-election by 7,049 votes.

== Bevanism ==
Burke topped the poll in the trade union section ballot for the Labour Party National Executive in October 1950. When the Bevanite faction in the Labour Party issued a pamphlet in September 1951, it attacked Burke for supporting Hugh Gaitskell's budget in the National Executive despite the fact that his union had put forward a motion at the Trades Union Congress criticising it. Burke was said to have hit back vigorously at the anonymous author of the pamphlet for disclosing confidential information and for misunderstanding the position of Trade Union members of the National Executive. When the shopworkers' union met at their 1952 conference, Burke was absent through illness; the Bevanites' position was backed by delegates. However the union continued to nominate him and he was re-elected to the National Executive in October of that year at the top of the poll.

== National Executive chairman ==
Playing a decreasing role in Parliament, Burke became chairman of the Labour Party National Executive sub-committee on Commonwealth and Imperial affairs in November 1952. He served as vice-chairman of the National Executive in 1952–53, and was then elected as chairman at the end of September 1953. Burke gave a Party Political Broadcast at the end of January 1954 calling for large firms to plough profits back into the company and get away from the "'grab all you can' atmosphere". As a fraternal delegate to the Co-operative Party conference, he made a speech which was interpreted as a criticism of Aneurin Bevan. Burke also had twice to inquire into the affairs of the Liverpool Exchange Constituency Labour Party, which was feuding with its forceful Member of Parliament Bessie Braddock.

== Retirement ==
Burke retired from the National Executive in 1956, and announced his decision to stand down from his Parliamentary seat at the next election. In December 1958 he presented a petition from Burnley along with 16 Mayors of Lancashire towns, calling for more Government help for the cotton trade. The Burnley petition claimed there was great despondency in the town. Burke left Parliament at the 1959 election, and died nine years later.

Parliament of the United Kingdom
Preceded by Vice-Admiral Gordon Campbell VC	Member of Parliament for Burnley; 1935 – 1959	Succeeded by Dan Jones
Political offices
Preceded by William Anstruther-Gray	Assistant Postmaster-General; 1945–1947	Succeeded by Charles Hobson
Party political offices
Preceded by Arthur Greenwood	Chair of the Labour Party; 1953–1954	Succeeded by Edith Summerskill
