= Peter Rylands =

English politician and wire manufacturer

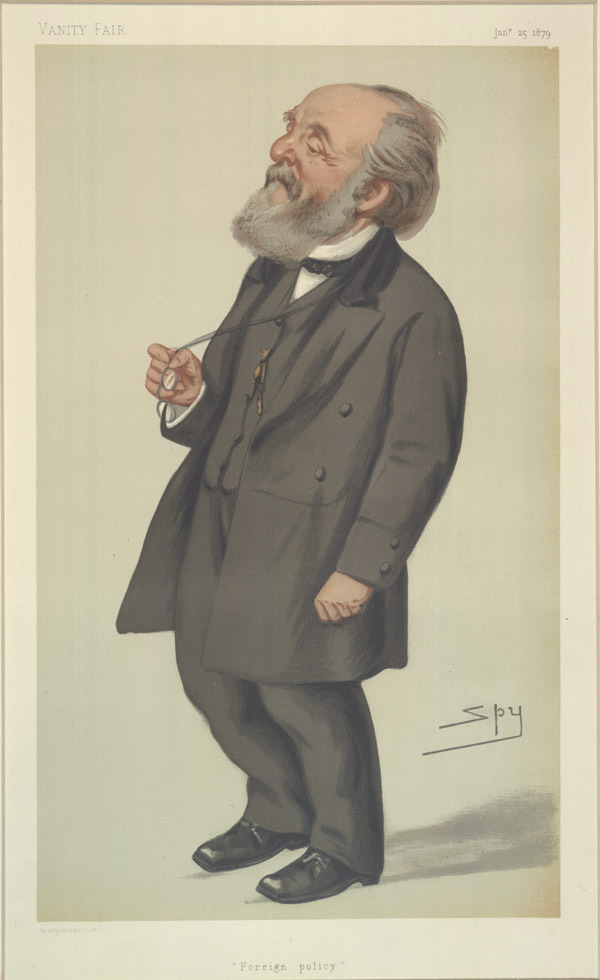
- Caricature by Spy published in Vanity Fair in 1879.

Member of Parliament for Burnley
- In office 1876-1887

Member of Parliament for Warrington
- In office 1868-1874

Mayor of Warrington
- In office 1853-1854

Personal details
- Born: 18 January 1820 Warrington, England
- Died: 8 February 1887 (aged 67)
- Party: Liberal; Liberal Unionist
- Children: 3, including L. Gordon and Peter
- Relatives: Dadie Rylands (grandson); James Glazebrook (grandfather)

Peter Rylands (18 January 1820 – 8 February 1887) was an English wire manufacturer in Lancashire and a Liberal (later Liberal Unionist) politician who was active in local government and sat in the House of Commons in two periods between 1868 and 1887.

== Life ==
Rylands was born at Warrington, the son of John Rylands and his wife Martha Glazebrook, daughter of the Rev. James Glazebrook, vicar of Belton. He was educated at Boteler's Grammar School, Warrington. He was a wire manufacturer and active in local government. As early as 1843 he was corresponding with Richard Cobden on political matters. He was Mayor of Warrington from 1853 to 1854. He had directorships of the Manchester and Liverpool Banking Co., of the Bridgewater Navigation Co., of Pearson and Knowles Coal and Iron Co., Limited, and of Rylands Brothers, Limited, iron masters and wire manufacturers. He was a J.P. for Cheshire and Lancashire.

At the 1868 general election Rylands was elected Member of Parliament (MP) for Warrington. He was a member of the Royal Commission on Contagious Diseases in 1872. He lost his Warrington seat at the 1874 general election, when he also stood unsuccessfully in the South-Eastern Division of Lancashire. In 1876 he won a parliamentary by-election in Burnley, where he was re-elected in 1880 and 1885. When the Liberals split over the First Home Rule Bill, Rylands joined the breakaway Liberal Unionists, and was returned to the House of Commons at the 1886 general election as a Liberal Unionist. He held the seat until his death on 8 February 1887 at the age of 67.

Rylands lived at Massey Hall, Thelwall which he left to the local authority for educational purposes.

Rylands married twice. He had three sons by his second wife Caroline Reynolds, whom he married in 1861. His eldest son, the author L. Gordon Rylands, published an edition of his letters. A grandson was the academic Dadie Rylands.

Parliament of the United Kingdom
Preceded by Gilbert Greenall	Member of Parliament for Warrington; 1868 – 1874	Succeeded by Gilbert Greenall
Preceded by Richard Shaw	Member of Parliament for Burnley; 1876 – 1887	Succeeded by John Slagg
