= Gordon Birtwistle =

British Liberal Democrat politician and former MP

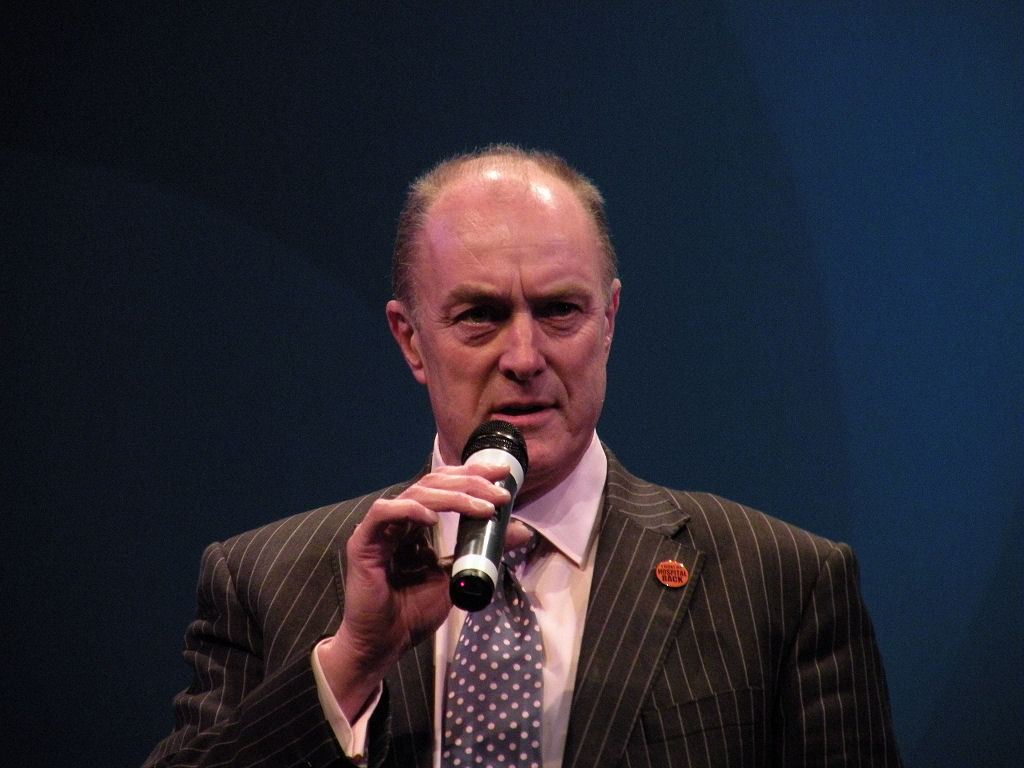
- Birtwistle in 2010

Member of Burnley Borough Council
- Incumbent
- Assumed office 2 May 2002
- Constituency: Coalclough with Deerplay

Parliamentary Private Secretary to the Chief Secretary to the Treasury
- In office 12 May 2010 – 11 September 2012
- Prime Minister: David Cameron
- Succeeded by: Lorely Burt

Member of Parliament for Burnley
- In office 6 May 2010 – 30 March 2015
- Preceded by: Kitty Ussher
- Succeeded by: Julie Cooper

Personal details
- Born: 6 September 1943 (age 82) Oswaldtwistle, Lancashire, England
- Party: Labour (until 1982); SDP (1982–88); Liberal Democrats (since 1988)

Gordon Birtwistle (born 6 September 1943) is a British Liberal Democrat politician and former MP. He was the Member of Parliament (MP) for the constituency of Burnley, England, from May 2010 to May 2015. He was Parliamentary Private Secretary to Danny Alexander, Chief Secretary to the Treasury from 2010 to 2012. From 2013, he was Government Apprenticeship Ambassador to Business.

== Career ==
Birtwistle began work as a craft engineering apprentice in 1958, with Howard & Bullough, who were textile machinery manufacturers in Accrington. He studied engineering at Accrington College on one day release and two nights a week and achieved two higher nationals, one in mechanical engineering and one in production engineering.

At the age of 21, he became a jig and tool draftsman with the same company, and stayed there until 1968, when he moved to Lucas Aerospace in Burnley as a machine shop methods engineer. He stayed there until aged 30, when he became a technical representative for Osborne Mushet Tools in Sheffield, who were manufacturers of metal cutting tools.

After five years, he became a director of C&G Cutter Grinding Services in Blackburn, named after its two founders Thomas Chew and William Gradwell. The company was sold in the mid-1980s, to a large engineering PLC, whom he continued to work for. After four years, he set up P&J Engineering Supplies, buying and selling engineering tools. In the late 1990s, he bought Stewart Engineering (precision engineers) with a partner. This later folded, due to a bad debt in 2002. P&J is still in existence, however Birtwistle retired in 2008.

=== Politics ===
Birtwistle originally entered politics as a Labour Party councillor in the 1970s, representing Great Harwood on Lancashire County Council. In 1982, he defected to the Social Democratic Party (SDP), and was elected to represent Deerplay ward on Burnley Borough Council the following year. In the late 1980s he led the council's SDP/Liberal Group, and from 2006 to 2010 was leader of the council itself. He was also Mayor of Burnley from 2002 to 2003. As of 2021, he remains a Liberal Democrat councillor for the borough's Coal Clough with Deerplay ward. He was also a candidate in the 2014 Liberal Democrats deputy leadership election.

==== MP ====
Birtwistle took Burnley from Labour for the Liberal Democrats at the 2010 general election, with a 12% swing and 1,818 majority. The first non-Labour MP in the Burnley constituency since 1935, he had previously contested the seat in 1992, 1997 and 2005. He was the oldest new MP of the 2010 intake, aged 66. On election, his three main aims were returning the Accident and Emergency department to Burnley General Hospital; bringing new high-value jobs and firms to Burnley; and reinstating direct rail travel between Burnley and Manchester.

A few weeks after his election, he was offered the role of Parliamentary Private Secretary to Danny Alexander, Chief Secretary to the Treasury. He hosted a manufacturing summit for the North West region in Burnley in June 2011, which was opened by Vince Cable with a speech at the new £80 million Burnley College and University of Central Lancashire campus. In October, it was announced that with government investment through the Regional Growth Fund, the planned direct rail link between Manchester and Burnley would proceed.

The project included the reinstatement of the Todmorden Curve, a five hundred metre stretch of track unused since the 1960s, and an upgrade to Burnley Manchester Road railway station. Birtwistle's successor as Burnley Council leader, Charlie Briggs, was reported as saying "Gordon Birtwistle has been an important influence as he been very active in pressing the case for this and a number of other economic development priorities". Projects to construct a new business park called "Burnley Bridge" and create the Visions Learning Trust University Technical College had also recently received funding.

In February 2012, Birtwistle became chairman of a new all-party parliamentary group dedicated to the advancement of apprenticeships. In March, he wrote of his support for increasing the minimum wage and the introduction of the pupil premium, and argued for measures to tackle tax avoidance.

That October, he introduced a private members bill to the Commons demanding improved careers advice for 12 to 16-year-old students. Although the bill received cross-party support and was given an unopposed first reading, it did not progress further. In March 2013, he was appointed as Government Apprenticeship Ambassador to Business, a new role intended to raise the profile and prestige of apprenticeships.

He was one of only a few Liberal Democrat MPs to oppose allowing same sex couples to marry, rebelling against his party in a number of Commons votes on the issue in 2013–14. He has been quoted as saying "Civil partnerships are fine. Gay marriage is just not on". He also said "I have been against it right from the beginning because I believe that's the view of the vast majority of people in Burnley".

In 2014, Birtwistle called for fellow Liberal Democrat parliamentary candidate Maajid Nawaz to be de-selected and his party membership cancelled, after he posted a controversial cartoon of Jesus and Muhammad on Twitter.

At the 2015 general election, Birtwistle lost his seat to Labour's Julie Cooper, who had also stood in 2010. However, the 6.2% swing away from Birtwistle was less than half the 15.2% national swing against his party. Birtwistle stood again in 2017, but was unsuccessful, and fell behind the Conservatives, into third place. In 2019, Birtwistle contested Burnley again. He remained in third place, but the Liberal Democrat constituency vote share declined again, falling to its lowest level since the party's formation in 1988. In 2024, Birtwistle contested Burnley for the eighth time. He moved up to 2nd place, getting 23.1% of the vote, an increase from 9% last time. If Birtwistle had won, he would have been the second oldest MP in the Commons, being two weeks and two days younger than Roger Gale.

Parliament of the United Kingdom
Preceded by Kitty Ussher	Member of Parliament for Burnley; 2010–2015	Succeeded by Julie Cooper
