= L. Gordon Rylands =

British criminologist and writer

- Born: 10 July 1862; Warrington, Lancashire, England
- Died: 20 December 1942 (aged 80)
- Education: University College London
- Spouse: Katherine Edwards (m. 1887)
- Children: 1
- Father: Peter Rylands
- Relatives: Peter Rylands (brother); Dadie Rylands (nephew)
- Writing career
- Genres: Crime, Christianity

Louis Gordon Rylands (10 July 1862 – 20 December 1942), best known as L. Gordon Rylands was a British criminologist and writer.

== Biography ==
Rylands was born in Warrington, Lancashire. His father was the politician Peter Rylands. He was educated at Charterhouse and University College London (B.A., B.Sc.). After completing his studies, he was secretary of the family business, Rylands Brothers wire manufacturers, from 1884 to 1887, then from 1897 to 1898 was science master at the Royal Grammar School, Newcastle upon Tyne. He worked as a private tutor from 1898 to 1924. At the time of his death he was assistant registrar of Grimes's Manchester Tutorial College. In 1887, he married Katherine Edwards; they had a daughter. Rylands was an uncle of the academic Dadie Rylands.

Rylands authored the book Crime: Its Causes and Remedy (1889). Rylands was best known as an advocate of the Christ myth theory. He denied the historicity of Jesus.

== Publications ==
- Crime: Its Causes and Remedy (1889)
- Correspondence and Speeches of Mr. Peter Rylands (Volume 1, Volume 2, 1890)
- Croesus, King of Lydia: A Drama (1902)
- The Evolution of Christianity (1927)
- A Critical Analysis of the Four Chief Pauline Epistles: Romans, First and Second Corinthians, and Galatians (1929)
- Did Jesus Ever Live? (1935)
- The Christian Tradition: An Examination of Objections to the Opinion that Jesus Was Not an Historical Person (1937)
- The Beginnings of Gnostic Christianity (1940)
