= John Collett Ryland =

English Baptist minister and author

John Collett Ryland (1723–1792) was an English Baptist minister and author.

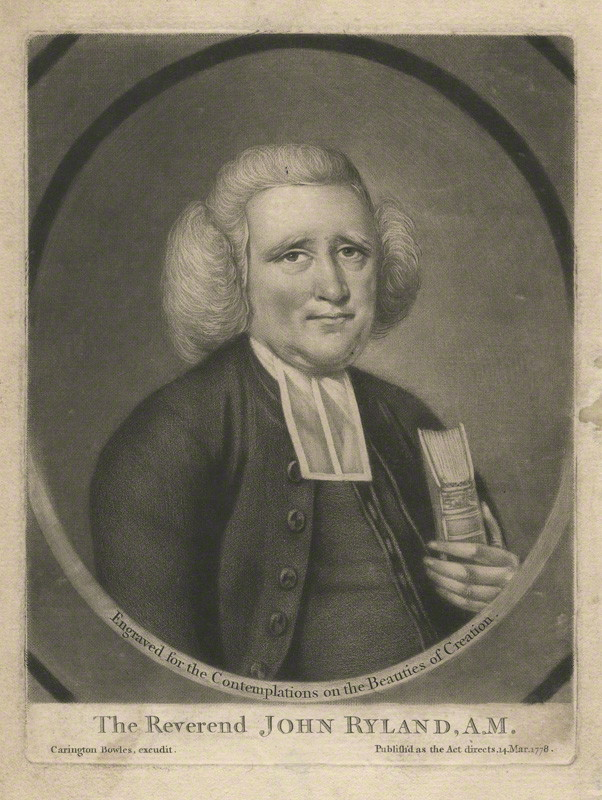
John Collett Ryland, 1778 engraving by Carington Bowles

== Life ==
The son of Joseph Ryland, a farmer of Lower Ditchford in Gloucestershire, and Freelove Collett of Slaughter, he was born at Bourton-on-the-Water on 12 October 1723. He was baptised in 1741 by Benjamin Beddome, who sent him about 1744 to Bernard Foskett's dissenting academy at Bristol to prepare for the Baptist ministry. He left Bristol in 1750 to be pastor of the Baptist church at Warwick, where he had already preached for four or five years. Here he kept school in St. Mary's parsonage-house, rented from the rector, Dr. Tate.

In October 1759 Ryland left Warwick for Northampton, where he lived 26 years as minister and schoolmaster. Among his many pupils was Samuel Bagster the Elder. His church was twice enlarged, and in 1781 his son John Ryland joined him as co-pastor. In 1786 he passed to his son the care of the church, and moved his school to Enfield, where it prospered. This was the school attended by the Romantic poet John Keats (1795-1821) and his brothers George and Tom.

Ryland frequently preached in the neighbourhood. He is said to have once addressed from a coach-box, in a seven-storied wig, holiday crowds assembled on the flat banks of the River Lea, near Ponder's End. He was massive in person, and his voice in singing was compared to the roaring of the sea. The degree of M.A. was conferred on him in 1769 by Brown University, founded in 1765.

Ryland died at Enfield on 24 July 1792, and was buried at Northampton, his funeral sermon being preached by John Rippon and published. An elegy by "Legatus" also appeared (London, 1792).

== Works ==
Ryland published to the point of money troubles, and as his friends James Hervey and Augustus Toplady told him, he would have done more if he had done less. With James Ferguson he issued An Easy Introduction to Mechanics, 1768, and A Series of Optical Cards. He contributed to the Baptist Register edited by John Rippon, wrote many of the articles for Charles Buck's Theological Dictionary, London, 1802, and edited Edward Polhill's Christus in Corde, Francis Quarles's Emblems, Jonathan Edwards's Sermons (1780), and Cotton Mather's Student and Preacher (1781).

Ryland's own publications (issued at London unless otherwise stated) were:

- Memoir of J. Alleine, 1766; 2nd ed. 1768.
- Life and Actions of Jesus Christ; by Way of Question and Answer, in Verse. 1767.
- Leland, John (1770). The Scheme of Infidelity Ruined for Ever.
- A Contemplation on the Existence and Perfections of God. 1774.
- A Contemplation on the Insufficiency of Reason and the Necessity of Divine Revelation. 1775.
- Contemplation on the Nature and Evidences of Divine Inspiration, Northampton, 1776. These last three, with additions, were republished (Northampton, 1779) with portrait, as Contemplations on the Beauties of Creation; 3rd ed. 3 vols. Northampton, 1780. Ryland, John (1782). Contemplations on the Beauties of Creation: The Divinity of Christ. Vol. III.
- The Preceptor or Counsellor of Human Life, 1776.
- A Key to the Greek New Testament. 1777.
- Character of James Hervey, with Letters, 1790.
- A Translation of John Owen's Demonstrations of Divine Justice, 1790.
- A Picture of Popery, prefixed to Luther's Discourses by Capt. Henry Bell. 1791.
- A Body of Divinity in Miniature, Designed for the Use of the Youth of Great Britain and France. 1790.
- Evidences that the Christian Religion is of God; 2nd ed. 1798.
- Select Essays on the Moral Virtue, and on Genius, Science, and Taste, 1792.
- An Address to the Ingenuous Youth of Great Britain. 1792.

On 2 July 1784 he delivered at sunrise over the grave of Andrew Gifford in Bunhill Fields an Oration which was published. It was reprinted in 1834 and 1888.

== Family ==
Ryland was twice married: first, on 23 December 1748, to Elizabeth Frith of Warwick (died 1779); and secondly to Mrs. Stott, widow of an officer. John Ryland (1753–1825) and Herman Witsius Ryland were sons by his first wife.
