= James Glazebrook =

English cleric, controversialist, and writer

James Glazebrook (11 October 1744–3 July 1803) was an English cleric, controversialist, and writer.

== Life ==
The son of William Glazebrook, he was born at Madeley, Shropshire, on 11 October 1744. When he was a young man of twenty-three, working as a collier and getter of ironstone, he was brought under the influence of the Rev. John William Fletcher, and decided to become a clergyman. With this view he was educated at Lady Huntingdon's Trevecca College in South Wales.

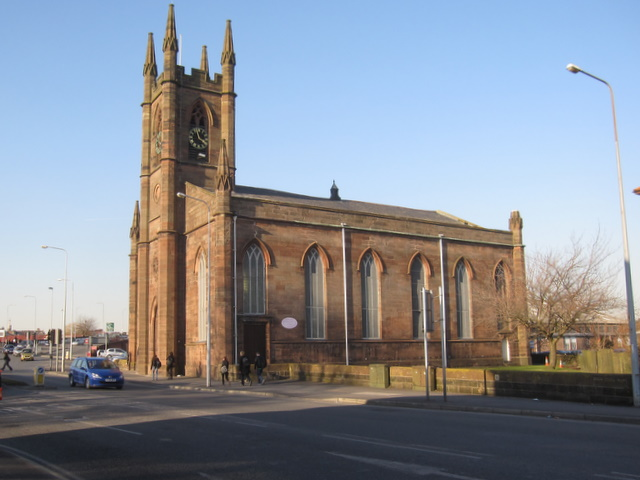
St James's Church, Latchford

Glazebrook was ordained deacon by Brownlow North, the Bishop of Lichfield and Coventry, in December 1771, and six years later he received priest's orders. In 1779 he married, and moved to Warrington, where he became incumbent of a new church, St. James's, Latchford, consecrated in 1781. On being appointed vicar of Belton, Leicestershire in 1796, in bad health, he left Warrington, but he retained his incumbency at St. James's. He died at Belton on 1 July 1803, aged 58.

== Works ==
Glazebrook wrote:

- A Defence of Infant Baptism, 1781. Glazebrook had a sharp controversy with Gilbert Wakefield on infant baptism.
- The Sacrifice of Thanksgiving, a Sermon, 1789.
- The Practice of what is called Extempore Preaching recommended, 1794.
- The Minister's Enquiry into the State of his People, a Sermon, 1798.
- Sermons on various Important Subjects (with Life by T. W. Whitaker), 1805.

== Family ==
In 1770 Glazebrook married Dorothy, daughter of Dr. Thomas Kirkland. Thomas Kirkland Glazebrook was their son.

== Notes ==
Attribution

This article incorporates text from a publication now in the public domain: Stephen, Leslie, ed. (1890). "Glazebrook, James". Dictionary of National Biography. Vol. 21. London: Smith, Elder & Co.
