= Jonathan Edwards Ryland =

British writer and tutor (1798–1866)

Jonathan Edwards Ryland (5 May 1798 – 16 April 1866) was an English man of letters and tutor.

== Life ==
Born in Northampton on 5 May 1798, he was the only son of John Ryland (1753–1825) and his second wife. He spent his formative years in Bristol and pursued his education at the Baptist college, where his father served as president, followed by studies at the University of Edinburgh under the guidance of Dr Thomas Brown. For a time, he was a tutor in mathematics and classics at Mill Hill College, then taught briefly at Bradford College. He later moved to Bristol, and in 1835 went to Northampton, where he remained for the rest of his life. The degree of MA was in 1852 conferred upon him by Brown University.

He died at Waterloo, Northampton, on 16 April 1866. On 4 January 1828 he had married Frances, daughter of John Buxton of Northampton.

== Works ==
Ryland mostly edited and translated the works of others. His earliest compositions were inserted in The Visitor (Bristol, 1823); he was a writer in the Baptist Magazine, and he edited vols. ix.–xii. of the fifth series of the Eclectic Review.

He wrote for John Kitto's Cyclopædia of Biblical Literature, and he published in 1856 a "Memoir" of Kitto. In 1864, he issued Wholesome Words; or, One Hundred Choice Passages from Old Authors.To the eighth edition of the Encyclopædia Britannica he contributed memoirs of John Foster, Andrew Fuller, Kitto, Robert Robinson, Schleiermacher, and Schwartz, and the articles "Northampton" and "Northamptonshire".

Translations by Ryland included Blaise Pascal's Thoughts on Religion, Bernard Jacobi on the General Epistle of St. James, Felix Neff's Dialogues on Sin and Salvation, Ernst Sartorius's Lectures on Christ, Karl Gottlieb Semisch's Life of Justin Martyr, François Gaussen's Canon of the Holy Scriptures, August Tholuck's Guido and Julius and Old Testament and the New, Christian Gottlob Barth's Weaver of Quelbrunn, Johann Peter Lange's Life of Christ (vol. ii.), two treatises by Ernst Wilhelm Hengstenberg, and several volumes by Augustus Neander on the History of the Church and its Dogmas.

Ryland edited the Pastoral Memorials of his father (1826–8), and the Life and Correspondence of John Foster (1846, 2 vols.) He also edited collections of Foster's Essays and Lectures.
