= Martin Waller =

Financial journalist

- Born: 27 March 1957 (age 69)
- Education: King's College School, Wimbledon
- Alma mater: University of Hull
- Occupations: Former Financial Journalist at The Times, Tempus Editor. Now retired.
- Writing career
- Notable awards: 'Financial Journalist of the Year' at the City of London Wealth Management Awards
- Website: tomspainesbones.wordpress.com

Martin Waller (born 27 March 1957) is a former financial journalist and columnist for The Times.

== Early years ==
Waller was born in London to parents Clifford Thomas Waller (b. 1930) and Diana Campbell Stewart (b. 1931), who were brought up in north London and married in 1955. He spent his childhood in southwest London.

== Education ==
After being educated at King's College School, he studied law from 1974 to 1977 at Hull University, a period he has written about in highly negative terms. He has described having left "on the first train out, the day after my last exam". He has never returned to the university. He graduated with a 2.2 degree. Waller then studied journalism at the Thomson Regional Newspapers course in Cardiff in the autumn of 1977.

== Career ==
He worked for several years at Thomson Magazines on Construction News and got his first job in the City at the Exchange Telegraph (Extel) wire service. Waller then joined The Times as a junior business reporter in April 1988 and worked in a number of roles in the business department including about a decade writing the Times City Diary. He took over the Tempus investment column in June 2010.

In 2008, Waller was interviewed by iBall of Interactive Investor International, in which he was described as having "ruffled a few feathers in his time" and being "renowned for delivering the most entertaining and informed City Diary in Britain". In February 2009, he wrote an article named "Guarantee for Guernsey's Rock depositors tax belief", believing that people were depositing money into the island to dodge taxes. He was criticised for not understanding the subject matter. He has called Corporate Social Responsibility "box ticking driven by external pressures rather than a genuine desire to do business in an ethical way."

Clare Rodway has described Waller as being "famous for his acerbic wit". Waller has criticised PowerPoint presentations, saying they are counter-productive and people cannot read while hearing a speech simultaneously.

In 2009 Waller publicly criticised Mehdi Hasan of the New Statesman over an article questioning Vince Cable, then shadow chancellor for the Liberal Democrats, over actions taken when Cable was chief economist at Shell. Hasan replied in the Statesman rebuking Waller, saying he "who specialises in fawning profiles of City slickers, now seems to have fallen in love with politicians and their PRs too."

In March 2014 Waller was named Financial Journalist of the Year at the City of London Wealth Management Awards. He left The Times on 31 May 2018. Waller now writes on an occasional basis for the online publication East Anglia Bylines writing on subjects such as economics, politics and business.

== Personal life ==
Waller tweeted and wrote a blog entitled 'Tom Paine's Bones'. The blog was described as "observations by a fifty-something financial journalist on business, morality, the morality of business and things that make me really angry".

The blog has also reflected his interest in history, music, mainly jazz and rock, religion and science fiction. Waller has described his politics as "fairly left wing but with a libertarian tinge".

The blog is now dormant. He is still active on Twitter. He is married with two children and moved from London to Woodbridge, Suffolk in October 2019.
