= John Ryland =

English Baptist minister and religious writer

John Ryland (1753–1825) was an English Baptist minister and religious writer. He was a founder and for ten years the secretary of the Baptist Missionary Society.

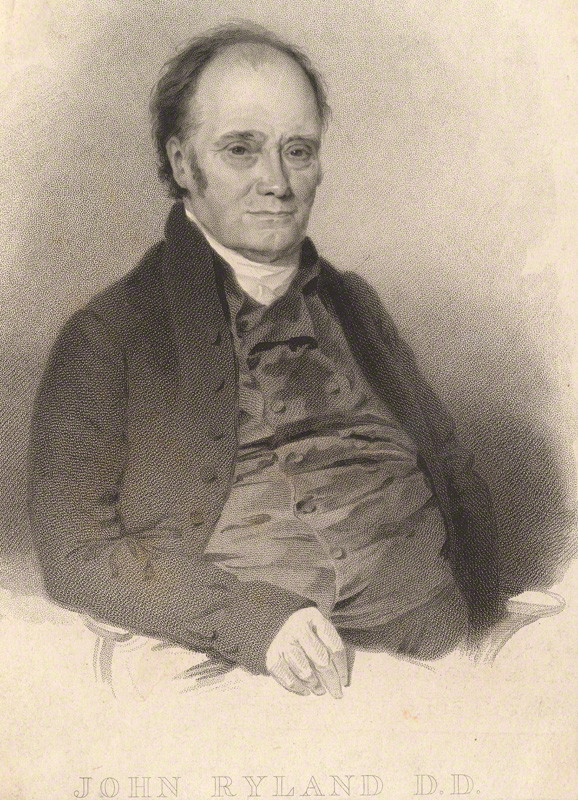
John Ryland

== Life ==
The son of John Collett Ryland, he was born at Warwick on 29 January 1753. Before he was 15, he began teaching in his father's school. On 13 September 1767 he was baptised in the River Nene, near Northampton, and, after preaching at small gatherings of Baptists from 1769, was formally admitted into the ministry on 10 March 1771. Until his twenty-fifth year he assisted his father in his school at Northampton, and in 1781 was associated with him in the charge of his church. after his father's retirement in 1786, he had sole charge of the congregation.

In December 1793 Ryland became minister of the Broadmead chapel in Bristol, combining with the post the presidency of the Bristol Baptist College. These positions he retained until his death. He joined, on 2 October 1792, in founding the Baptist Missionary Society, and acted as its secretary from 1815 until his death at Bristol on 25 May 1825. On 2 June he was buried in the ground adjoining Broadmead chapel, and on 5 June Robert Hall, who succeeded him as minister, preached a memorial sermon (published 1825).

A convinced Calvinist throughout his life, Ryland moved from the high Calvinism of his father to an evangelical Calvinist position, under the influence of his long-term correspondent John Newton, and the writings of the American theologian Jonathan Edwards. He is said to have preached 8,691 sermons. Among his friends were Maria De Fleury, William Carey, John Erskine, Andrew Fuller, Robert Hall, John Newton, John Rippon, and Thomas Scott. The degree of D. D. was conferred on him by Brown University, in 1792.

== Works ==
Ryland's major works were:

- Ryland, John (1765). An Oration by a School-boy Twelve Years of Age.
- The Plagues of Egypt, by a School-boy Thirteen Years of Age. 1766.
- Ryland, John (1769). A Compendious View of the Principal Truths of the Glorious Gospel of Christ. For the Use of Youth. Also a 1774 edition
- Ryland, John (1771). Serious Essays on the Truths of the Glorious Gospel. (consisting of 121 pieces in verse); 2nd edition corrected and enlarged, 1775; 3rd edition revised by Rev. J. A. Jones, 1829.
- The Divine Inspiration of the Holy Scriptures; a Poem, 1772.
- The Faithfulness of God in His Word Evinced. 1773. a poetic rendering of the first argument of Robert Fleming the elder in The Fulfilment of Scripture.
- Salvation Finished: a Funeral Sermon on Robert Hall senior; with an Appendix on the Church at Arnsby, 1791; 2nd edit. revised by the Rev. J. A. Jones, 1850.
- Earnest Charge of an Affectionate Pastor,’ 1794.
- Christianæ Militiæ Viaticum; a brief Directory for Evangelical Ministers; 2nd edit. 1798; 6th edit. 1825.
- Ryland, John (1827) [1814]. A Candid Statement of the Reasons which Induce the Baptists to Differ in Opinion and Practice from Their Christian Brethren.
- Memoir of the Rev. Andrew Fuller, 1816 and 1818.
- Serious Remarks on the different Representations of Evangelical Doctrine, pt. i. 1817, pt. ii. 1818.

More works:

- Christ manifested, and Satan frustrated. A sermon on I John iii;. 1782.
- The Law Not Against the Promises of God. A Sermon on Gal. I ii. 21, 22;. 1787.
- Christ, the great source of the believer's consolation; and the grand subject of the Gospel Ministry. A sermon on Col. i. 27, 28;. 1788.
- The Certain Increase of the Glory and Kingdom of Jesus: a Sermon on I John ii. 30. 1794.
- The Dependance of the Whole Law and the Prophets, on the Two Primary Commandments: a Sermon on Matt. Xxii. 40. 1798.
- Ryland, John (1826). Pastoral Memorials. Vol. I.
- Ryland, John (1828). Pastoral Memorials. Vol. II.
- Hymns and Verses on Sacred Subjects. 1862.

Two volumes of Pastoral Memorials, consisting of abstracts of some of his sermons, 25 of his hymns, and a short memoir by his son, were published after his death (vol. i. in 1826 and vol. ii. in 1828). Ryland wrote many prefaces for religious works and for biographies of his friends.

Ryland was a popular hymn-writer. John Julian's Hymnology states that 13 of his hymns were in common use. His earliest appeared in Serious Essays (1771). Others appeared in magazines between 1770 and 1790. Ninety-nine Hymns and Verses on Sacred Subjects, mainly from unpublished manuscripts, with a biographical sketch, were published in 1862.

== Family ==
Ryland married, on 12 January 1780, Elizabeth, daughter of Robert Tyler of Banbury, who died on 23 January 1787, a few weeks after the birth of her only child. His second wife was Frances, eldest daughter of William Barrett of Northampton, whom he married on 18 June 1789. She survived him, with one son, Jonathan Edwards Ryland, and three daughters.

== Notes ==
Attribution

This article incorporates text from a publication now in the public domain: Lee, Sidney, ed. (1897). "Ryland, John (1753-1825)". Dictionary of National Biography. Vol. 50. London: Smith, Elder & Co.
