= Dadie Rylands =

British literary scholar and theatre director

Dadie Rylands CH CBE
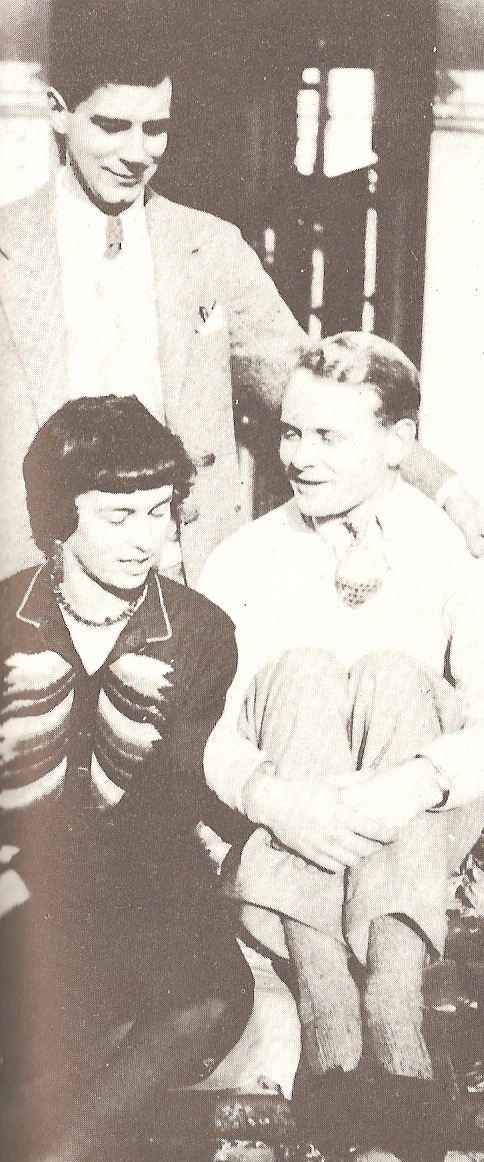
- Dadie Rylands with Raymond Mortimer and Frances Partridge
- Born: George Humphrey Wolferstan Rylands; 23 October 1902; Tockington, United Kingdom
- Died: 16 January 1999 (aged 96); Cambridge, United Kingdom
- Education: Eton College; King's College, Cambridge

George Humphrey Wolferstan Rylands CH CBE (23 October 1902 – 16 January 1999), known as Dadie Rylands, was a British literary scholar and theatre director.

Rylands was born at the Down House, Tockington, Gloucestershire, to Thomas Kirkland Rylands, a land agent, and Bertha Nisbet Wolferstan (née Thomas). His grandfather was the Liberal politician Peter Rylands. Educated at Eton College and King's College, Cambridge, he was a Fellow of King's from 1927 until his death. While at Cambridge, he became a friend of John Maynard Keynes, also a student and Fellow at King’s. He also befriended Cecil Beaton there.

As well as studying Shakespeare, he was actively involved in the theatre. He directed and acted in many productions for The Marlowe Society, and was chairman of the Cambridge Arts Theatre from 1946 to 1982.

Rylands' 1939 Shakespeare anthology Ages of Man was the basis of John Gielgud's one-man show of the same title. Though Rylands specialised in directing university productions at Cambridge, he also directed Gielgud in professional productions of The Duchess of Malfi and Hamlet in London in 1945. In August and September 1948, he led The Marlowe Society to the ruins of Berlin to play William Shakespeare and John Webster, as part of Foreign Office soft-power tour during the Berlin Airlift.

He was made a Commander of the Order of the British Empire (CBE) in 1961 and a Member of the Order of the Companions of Honour (CH) in 1987.
