= Burnley Borough Council elections =

Local government elections in Lancashire, England

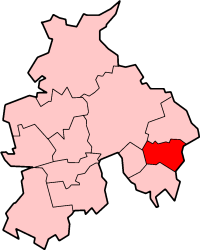
Burnley shown within the non-metropolitan county of Lancashire (Unitary authorities excluded)

Burnley Borough Council elections are generally held three years out of every four, with a third of the council elected each time. Burnley Borough Council is the local authority for the non-metropolitan district of Burnley in Lancashire, England. Since the last boundary changes in 2002, 45 councillors have been elected from 15 wards.

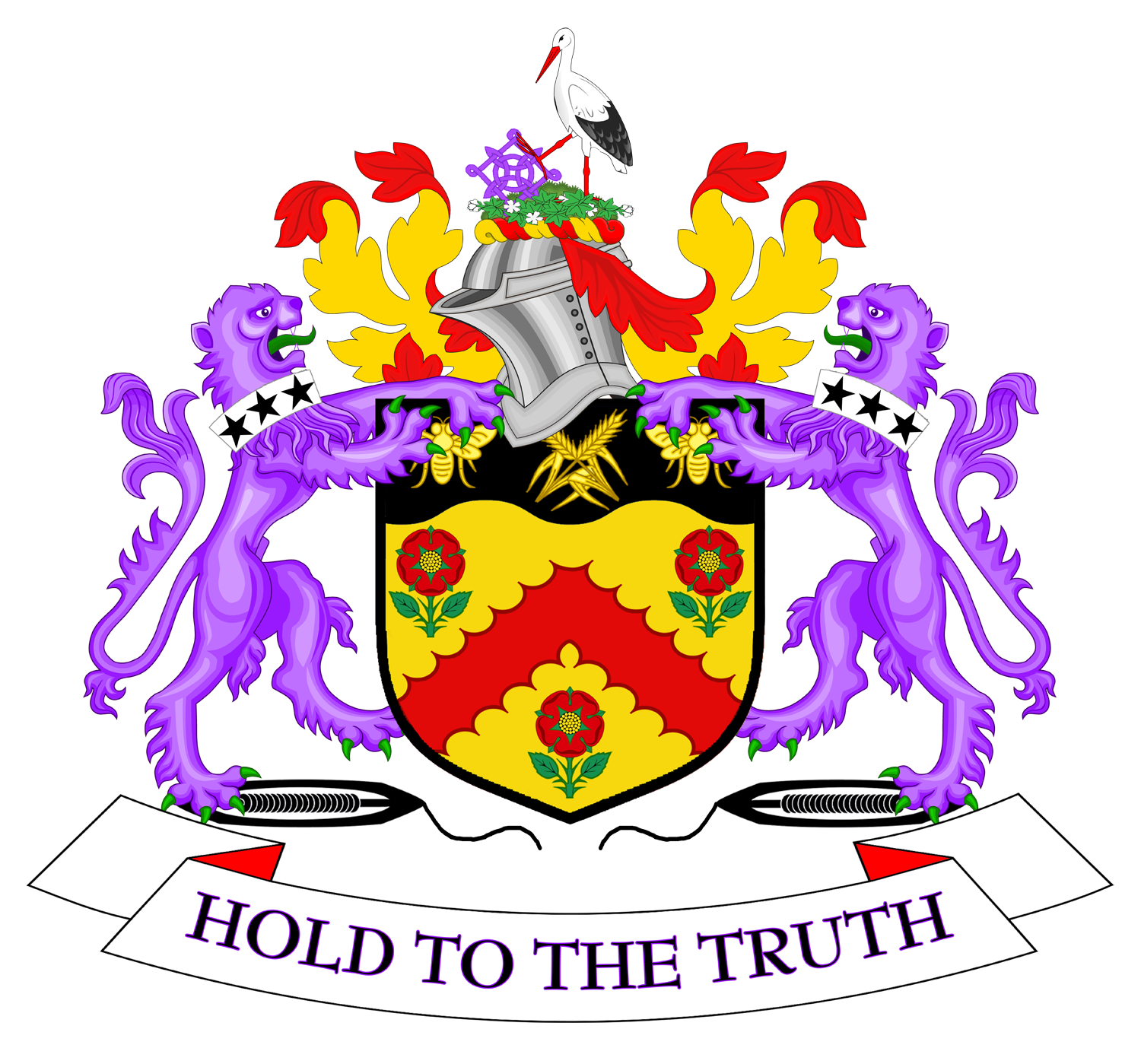
Coat of Arms of the Borough Council

== Council elections ==
- 1973 Burnley Borough Council election
- 1976 Burnley Borough Council election (New ward boundaries)
- 1979 Burnley Borough Council election
- 1980 Burnley Borough Council election
- 1982 Burnley Borough Council election
- 1983 Burnley Borough Council election
- 1984 Burnley Borough Council election
- 1986 Burnley Borough Council election
- 1987 Burnley Borough Council election (Borough boundary changes took place but the number of seats remained the same)
- 1988 Burnley Borough Council election
- 1990 Burnley Borough Council election
- 1991 Burnley Borough Council election (New ward boundaries)
- 1992 Burnley Borough Council election
- 1994 Burnley Borough Council election
- 1995 Burnley Borough Council election
- 1996 Burnley Borough Council election
- 1998 Burnley Borough Council election
- 1999 Burnley Borough Council election
- 2000 Burnley Borough Council election
- 2002 Burnley Borough Council election (New ward boundaries reduced the number of seats by 3)
- 2003 Burnley Borough Council election
- 2004 Burnley Borough Council election
- 2006 Burnley Borough Council election
- 2007 Burnley Borough Council election
- 2008 Burnley Borough Council election
- 2010 Burnley Borough Council election
- 2011 Burnley Borough Council election
- 2012 Burnley Borough Council election
- 2014 Burnley Borough Council election
- 2015 Burnley Borough Council election
- 2016 Burnley Borough Council election
- 2018 Burnley Borough Council election
- 2019 Burnley Borough Council election
- 2021 Burnley Borough Council election
- 2022 Burnley Borough Council election
- 2023 Burnley Borough Council election
- 2024 Burnley Borough Council election
- 2026 Burnley Borough Council election

== Result maps ==
2002
Labour Party: 27
Liberal Democrats: 8
Conservative Party: 4
British National Party: 3
Independent (politician): 2

2003
British National Party: 7
Labour Party: 5
Liberal Democrats: 2
Conservative Party: 1
Independent (politician): 1

2004
Labour Party: 7
Liberal Democrats: 5
Conservative Party: 2
British National Party: 1

2006
Liberal Democrats: 8
Labour Party: 5
Conservative Party: 2
British National Party: 2

2007
Liberal Democrats: 7
Labour Party: 5
Conservative Party: 2
British National Party: 1

2008
Liberal Democrats: 9
Labour Party: 3
Conservative Party: 2
British National Party: 1

2010
Liberal Democrats: 9
Labour Party: 6
Conservative Party: 1

2011
Labour Party: 8
Liberal Democrats: 5
Conservative Party: 2

2012
Labour Party: 11
Liberal Democrats: 2
Conservative Party: 2

2014
Labour Party: 9
Liberal Democrats: 5
Conservative Party: 1

2015
Labour Party: 10
Liberal Democrats: 3
Conservative Party: 2
UK Independence Party: 1

2016
Labour Party: 8
Liberal Democrats: 5
Conservative Party: 1
UK Independence Party: 1

2018
Labour Party: 7
Liberal Democrats: 3
Conservative Party: 2
Burnley and Padiham Independent Party: 1
Green: 1
UK Independence Party: 1

2019
Labour Party: 6
Liberal Democrats: 3
Burnley and Padiham Independent Party: 3
Conservative Party: 1
Green: 1
UK Independence Party: 1

2021
Labour Party: 5
Conservative Party: 4
Green: 3
Liberal Democrats: 2
Burnley and Padiham Independent Party: 1

2022
Labour Party: 7
Liberal Democrats: 3
Conservative Party: 2
Green: 2
Liberal Democrats: 3
Burnley and Padiham Independent Party: 1

2023
Labour Party: 8
Conservative Party: 2
Liberal Democrats: 2
Green: 2
Burnley and Padiham Independent Party: 1

2024
Labour Party: 6
Conservative Party: 3
Independent: 3
Liberal Democrats: 2
Green: 1

2026
Reform UK: 11
Independent: 3
Liberal Democrats: 1

== By-election results ==
=== 1998-2002 ===
Cliviger with Worsthorne By-Election 2 July 1998
Party	Candidate	Votes	%	±%
Conservative		611	59.4	+11.6
Labour		417	40.6	−11.6
Majority		194	18.8	
Turnout		1,028		
Conservative gain from Labour		Swing		

Lowerhouse By-Election 22 November 2001
Party	Candidate	Votes	%	±%
Independent	Samuel Holgate	467	38.8	−33.0
Labour		421	35.0	+6.8
BNP		283	23.5	+23.5
Socialist Alliance		32	2.7	+2.7
Majority		46	3.8	
Turnout		1,203	27.8	
Independent hold		Swing		

Trinity By-Election 22 November 2001
Party	Candidate	Votes	%	±%
Labour	Elizabeth Monk	555	57.9	+1.3
BNP		181	18.9	+18.9
Independent		172	18.0	+18.0
Socialist Alliance		50	5.2	+5.2
Majority		374	39.0	
Turnout		958	28.8	
Labour hold		Swing		

Rose Hill By-Election 29 November 2001
Party	Candidate	Votes	%	±%
Labour	Denis Otter	380	31.7	+9.0
Independent		284	23.7	−24.1
BNP		230	19.2	+19.2
Liberal Democrats		203	16.9	+16.9
Conservative		101	8.4	−21.1
Majority		96	8.0	
Turnout		1,198	28.8	
Labour gain from Independent		Swing		

=== 2002–2006 ===
Hapton with Park By-Election 19 June 2003
Party	Candidate	Votes	%	±%
Liberal Democrats	Peter McCann	788	33.1	+33.1
BNP	Andy Kenyon	777	32.6	−6.4
Labour	Andy Tatchell	679	28.5	−5.9
Independent	Patricia Stinton	76	3.2	−15.6
Conservative	Alan Marsden	62	2.6	−5.2
Majority		11	0.5	
Turnout		2,382	53.5	
Liberal Democrats gain from Labour		Swing		

Lanehead By-Election 16 October 2003
Party	Candidate	Votes	%	±%
Liberal Democrats	Martin Smith	1,070	50.6	+32.0
Labour	Julie Cooper	464	21.9	−9.8
BNP	John Cave	357	16.9	−17.1
Independent	Ann Royle	127	6.0	−9.8
Conservative	Paul Coates	98	4.6	+4.6
Majority		606	28.7	
Turnout		2,116	48.2	
Liberal Democrats gain from BNP		Swing		

Bank Hall By-Election 5 May 2005
Party	Candidate	Votes	%	±%
Labour	Julie Cooper	1,056	48.0	−2.2
Liberal Democrats	Abdul Hamid	514	23.3	−2.7
BNP	Derek Dawson	368	16.7	+16.7
Conservative	Paul Coates	266	12.0	−11.8
Majority		542	24.7	
Turnout		2,204	53.5	
Labour hold		Swing		

=== 2006–2010 ===
Brunshaw By-Election 15 February 2007
Party	Candidate	Votes	%	±%
Liberal Democrats	Allen Harris	875	44.1	+16.3
BNP	Paul McDevitt	538	27.1	+0.6
Labour	Karen Baker	479	24.2	−6.7
Conservative	Tony Coulson	90	4.5	−10.2
Majority		337	17.0	
Turnout		1,982	39.9	
Liberal Democrats gain from Labour		Swing		

Daneshouse with Stoneyholme By-Election 15 February 2007
Party	Candidate	Votes	%	±%
Labour	Shah Hussain	944	46.6	−3.7
Liberal Democrats	Mohammed Malik	906	44.7	−5.0
England First	Steven Smith	141	7.0	+7.0
Conservative	Alan Marsden	35	1.7	+1.7
Majority		38	1.9	
Turnout		2,026	52.4	
Labour gain from Liberal Democrats		Swing		

Rosegrove with Lowerhouse By-Election 4 June 2009
Party	Candidate	Votes	%	±%
Liberal Democrats	Iris Gates	645	41.2	+1.1
BNP	John Cave	400	25.6	−5.4
Labour	Charles Baker	304	19.4	+1.0
Conservative	Barry Elliott	215	13.7	+3.4
Majority		245	15.6	
Turnout		1,564	32.8	
Liberal Democrats hold		Swing		

=== 2010–2014 ===
Rosegrove with Lowerhouse Ward By-Election 10 March 2011
Party	Candidate	Votes	%	±%
Labour	Beatrice Foster	521	43.1	+11.8
BNP	Paul McDevitt	288	23.8	+5.4
Liberal Democrats	Kate Mottershead	261	21.6	−11.8
Conservative	Mathew Isherwood	81	6.7	−10.2
Independent	Andrew Hennessey	58	4.8	+4.8
Majority		233	19.3	
Turnout		1,209		
Labour gain from Liberal Democrats		Swing		

Trinity By-Election 13 September 2012
Party	Candidate	Votes	%	±%
Labour	Tony Martin	493	49.3	−8.8
Liberal Democrats	Stephanie Forrest	256	25.6	−5.8
Conservative	Tom Watson	96	9.6	+9.6
BNP	Derek Dawson	95	9.5	−1.1
UKIP	Craig Ramplee	35	3.5	3.5
National Front	Steven Smith	26	2.6	+2.6
Majority		237	23.7	
Turnout		1,001		
Labour hold		Swing		

=== 2018-2022 ===
Rosehill with Burnley Wood By-Election 11 April 2019
Party	Candidate	Votes	%	±%
Liberal Democrats	Peter McCann	341	37.5	−11.0
Labour	Andy Devanney	249	27.4	−6.8
BAPIP	Paula Riley	154	16.9	+16.9
Conservative	Phil Chamberlain	115	12.6	−0.4
Green	Victoria Alker	51	5.6	+1.3
Majority		92	10.1	
Turnout		910		
Liberal Democrats hold		Swing		

=== 2022-2026 ===
Rosehill with Burnley Wood By-Election 10 November 2022
Party	Candidate	Votes	%	±%
Labour	Bill Horrocks	372	39.4	+15.8
Liberal Democrats	Russell Neal	363	38.4	−17.8
Conservative	Maison McGowan-Doe	123	13.0	−2.1
Green	Anthony Davis	87	9.2	+4.1
Majority		9	1.0	
Turnout		945		
Labour gain from Conservative		Swing		

Trinity By-Election 26 October 2023
Party	Candidate	Votes	%	±%
Green	Alexander Hall	347	59.5	−4.5
Labour	Mubashar Lone	163	28.0	+1.0
Conservative	Susan Nutter	73	12.5	+3.5
Majority		184	1.0	
Turnout		583		
Green hold		Swing		

Lanehead By-Election 4 November 2025
Party	Candidate	Votes	%	±%
Independent	Shiraz Ahmed	706	44.4	+44.4
Reform	Gavin Theaker	510	32.1	+32.1
Labour	Millie Towers	262	16.5	−25.9
Conservative	Dale Ferrier	61	3.8	−11.7
Green	Affan Burki	50	3.1	+3.1
Majority		196	12.3	
Turnout		1,589		
Independent gain from Labour		Swing		

Queensgate By-Election 4 November 2025
Party	Candidate	Votes	%	±%
Independent	Musharaf Parvez	679	55.7	+55.7
Reform	Victoria Fletcher	240	19.7	+19.7
Labour	Dylan Rea	133	10.9	−9.1
Green	Janet Hall	71	5.8	+5.8
Independent	Javad Mokhammad	52	4.3	+4.3
Conservative	Susan Nutter	43	3.5	−7.3
Majority		439	36.0	
Turnout		1,218		
Independent gain from Labour		Swing		
