= Gawthorpe (ward) =

- electoral ward
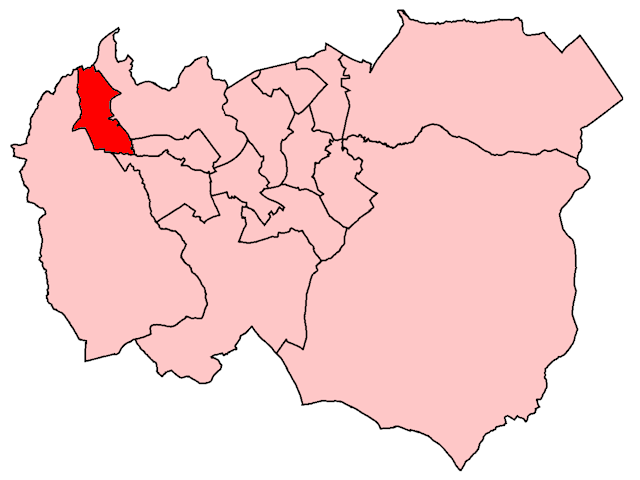
- Gawthorpe Ward shown within Burnley

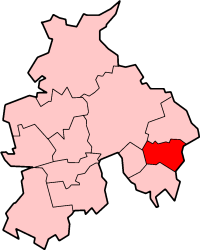
- Burnley shown within non-metropolitan Lancashire
- Coordinates: 53.803°N 2.310°W
- Sovereign State: United Kingdom
- Constituent country: England
- Region: North West England
- County: Lancashire
- Non-metropolitan district: Burnley
- Area: 0.68 sq mi (1.77 km^{2})
- Population (2011 Census): 6,148
- ONS code: 30UDGY
- UK Parliament constituency: Burnley

Gawthorpe is an electoral ward in the non-metropolitan district of Burnley in Lancashire, England. The population of the Burnley Ward at the 2011 census was 6,148. The ward covers the majority of the town of Padiham, meaning it is a largely urban area. It is part of the Padiham and Burnley West electoral division of Lancashire County Council, the Burnley UK Parliament constituency. Prior to Brexit in 2020 it was part of the North West England European Parliament constituency.

== History ==
Burnley Borough Council Elections: Gawthorpe Ward
Election	Party	Councillor Elected	Majority (%)
2003	Labour	Linda Gauton	3.7
2004	Labour	Andy Tatchell	
2006	Labour	Frank Cant	1.8
2007	Labour	John Harbour	27.9
2008	Labour	Andy Tatchell	30.1
2010	Labour	Frank Cant	17.5
2011	Labour	John Harbour	38.6
2012	Labour	Andy Tatchell	57.9
2014	Labour	Frank Cant	42.5
2015	Labour	John Harbour	36.5
2016	Labour	Andy Tatchell	33.8
2018	Labour	Frank Cant	5.6
2019	Labour	John Harbour	0.7
2021	Conservative	Karen Ingham	17.8
2022	Labour	Alun Lewis	21.3
2023	Labour	John Harbour	

The ward is thought to date from the 1974 formation of the borough, however it was extended into the Hapton with Park ward in the 2002 reorganisation.

=== Elections ===
The ward elects three councillors, each for a period of 4 years.

== Geography ==
The ward contains approximately the eastern half of the civil parish of Padiham, but not the lands of Gawthorpe Hall for which it is named. The western boundary follows Slade Lane from Huntroyde Hall in the north, staying with the road as it turns into Moor Lane, before crossing Burnley Road and briefly following the River Calder. It then cuts back to the east, along the route of the disused North Lancashire Loop railway to Station road, following as it turns into Thompson Street, then Abingdon Road. Its other boundaries are the same as those of the parish.

The ward contains Shuttleworth College, Padiham Primary School and a Nursery. Also Padiham Town Hall, Police Station and Fire Station, as well as the retail district and Market. As previously mentioned the River Calder passes through the ward, as does the A671. The ward is almost entirely urban in nature, with a single farm in its north-west corner. In 2001, 75.8% of dwellings where in the lowest Council Tax band.

== Demography ==
The United Kingdom Census 2001 showed a total resident population for this ward of 6,119 of which 2,918 are male and 3,201 female, with a mean age of 37.92 Years. The racial composition of the ward is 98% White and 1.23% South Asian or South Asian / British. The largest religious groups are Christian (79.54%) and Muslim (1.05%). 58.8% of adults between the ages of 16 and 74 are classed as economically active and in work.
