= 2019 Burnley Borough Council election =

Uk local election

2019 local election results in Burnley

The 2019 Burnley Borough Council election took place on 2 May 2019 to elect members of Burnley Borough Council in England. This election was held on the same day as other local elections. One third of the council was up for election, and each successful candidate will serve a four-year term of office, expiring in 2023. These seats were last contested in 2015.

In 2017, four members of the local Liberal Democrats (including Charlie Briggs and Mark Payne) left the party over its stance on Brexit, to form the Burnley and Padiham Independent Party. However in early 2019 Christine White (elected in 2016) stepped down following a complaint from a resident, prompting a by-election in the Rosehill with Burnley Wood ward which was won by Peter McCann of the Liberal Democrats. After the 2018 election, Bill and Margaret Brindle (both Coalclough with Deerplay ward) who had been sitting on the council as independents after also splitting with the local Lib Dems, joined the Labour group.

Following the election Labour lost control of the council and a coalition of all the other parties formed a new executive with Charlie Briggs returning to the role of Council leader to replace Mark Townsend.

== State of the Parties ==
After the election, the composition of the council was:

Burnley Council composition 2019

Party	Seats	±
Labour	22	▼5
Liberal Democrat	8	▲2
BAPIP	5	▲2
Conservative	4	▼1
UKIP	3	▲1
Green	2	▲1
Independent	1	-
Source: The Guardian

== Election results ==
=== Overall election result ===
Overall result compared with 2018.

Burnley Borough Council election result, 2019
Party	Candidates						Votes		
Party	Stood	Elected	Gained	Unseated	Net	% of total	%	No.	Net %
Labour	15	6	0	5	▼5	40.0	36.0	7,395	▼7.3
Green	15	1	1	0	▲1	6.7	16.1	3,310	▲8.0
Conservative	15	1	0	1	▼1	6.7	13.8	2,843	▼4.9
BAPIP	6	3	2	0	▲2	20.0	13.4	2,744	▲5.0
Liberal Democrats	7	3	2	0	▲2	20.0	11.6	2,380	▼3.7
UKIP	3	1	1	0	▲1	6.7	8.3	1,700	▲3.0
National Front	1	0	0	0	Steady	0.0	0.9	182	New

== Ward results ==
=== Bank Hall ===
Bank Hall
Party	Candidate	Votes	%	±%
Labour	Sehrish Lone	968	70.2	▼4.9
Green	Martyn Hurt	244	17.7	▲8.4
Conservative	Nicola Thompson	167	12.1	▼3.5
Majority		724	52.5	▼7.0
Labour hold		Swing	▼3.5	

=== Briercliffe ward ===
Briercliffe
Party	Candidate	Votes	%	±%
Liberal Democrats	Anne Rosemarie Kelly	825	62.7	▲11.9
Labour	Brian Cooper	188	14.3	▼7.9
Conservative	Susan Margaret Nutter	167	10.5	▼2.2
Green	Mark David Alker	136	10.3	▲6.6
Majority		637	48.4	▲19.8
Turnout		1316	30.4	▲1.0
Liberal Democrats hold		Swing	▲9.9	

=== Brunshaw ward ===
Brunshaw
Party	Candidate	Votes	%	±%
Labour	Ian Mark Townsend	548	49.0	▼11.0
Green	Janet Renata Hall	201	18.0	▲13.5
Conservative	Ellen Rosemary Sunter	187	16.7	▼8.1
National Front	Steven Smith	182	16.3	▲16.3
Majority		347	31.0	▼0.2
Turnout		1118	24.3	0.0
Labour hold		Swing	▼12.3	

=== Cliviger with Worsthorne ward ===
Cliviger with Worsthorne
Party	Candidate	Votes	%	±%
Conservative	Cosima Cecilia Towneley	703	46.3	▼17.2
UKIP	Ernest Stuart Calderbank	407	26.8	▲26.8
Labour	Peter Leslie Pike	217	14.3	▼14.8
Green	Andrew Edward Wight	193	12.7	▲5.3
Majority		296	19.5	▼14.8
Turnout		1520	35.8	▼2.2
Conservative hold		Swing	▼22.0	

=== Coalclough with Deerplay ward ===
Coalclough with Deerplay
Party	Candidate	Votes	%	±%
Liberal Democrats	John Howard Baker	375	29.9	▼20.4
BAPIP	James Ward Anderson	345	27.5	▲27.5
Labour	Bill Horrocks	291	23.3	▼5.7
Conservative	David Neil Heginbotham	150	12.0	▼2.8
Green	Stephen Murphy	92	7.3	▲1.5
Majority		30	2.4	▼18.9
Turnout		1253	35.5	▲3.2
Liberal Democrats hold		Swing	▲24.0	

=== Daneshouse with Stoneyholme ward ===
Daneshouse with Stoneyholme
Party	Candidate	Votes	%	±%
Labour	Wajid Iltaf Khan	1,453	90.5	▼1.5
Green	Alex James Hall	92	5.7	▲3.4
Conservative	Claire Elizabeth Ingham	61	3.8	▲2.0
Majority		1361	84.7	▼7.1
Turnout		1606	38.2	▼5.8
Labour hold		Swing	▼2.5	

=== Gannow ward ===
Gannow
Party	Candidate	Votes	%	±%
BAPIP	Charlie Briggs	865	70.2	▲19.5
Labour	Peter John Kenyon	190	15.4	▼14.8
Conservative	Joanne Broughton	96	7.8	▼4.0
Green	Jai Redman	82	6.7	▲4.8
Majority		675	54.7	▲33.4
Turnout		1233	30.6	▼0.1
BAPIP gain from Liberal Democrats		Swing	▲17.2	

=== Gawthorpe ward ===
Gawthorpe
Party	Candidate	Votes	%	±%
Labour	John Harbour	550	40.9	▲5.5
UKIP	Karen Ingham	541	40.3	▲10.5
Conservative	Phillip Clarke	148	11.0	▼5.2
Green	Clare Mary Long-Summers	105	7.8	▲4.4
Majority		9	0.7	▼4.9
Turnout		1344	30.4	▲1.3
Labour hold		Swing	▼2.5	

=== Hapton with Park ward ===
Hapton with Park
Party	Candidate	Votes	%	±%
UKIP	Peter Phillip Gill	752	49.2	▲12.9
Labour	Jean Cunningham	318	20.8	▼11.5
Green	Clare Elizabeth Hales	297	19.4	▲17.9
Conservative	Aaron Luke Mark Lewis	163	10.7	▼3.0
Majority		434	28.4	▲25.0
Turnout		1530	34.0	▲0.6
UKIP gain from Labour		Swing	▲12.2	

=== Lanehead ward ===
Lanehead
Party	Candidate	Votes	%	±%
Labour	Ann Royle	658	50.2	▼4.2
Liberal Democrats	Pippa Lishman	370	28.2	▲6.8
Conservative	Narayana Picton	143	10.9	▼6.9
Green	Crissie Fay Amber Harter	140	10.8	▲5.0
Majority		288	22.0	▼11.6
Turnout		1311	29.4	▲5.5
Labour hold		Swing	▼5.5	

=== Queensgate ward ===
Queensgate
Party	Candidate	Votes	%	±%
Labour	Mohammed Ishtiaq	1,008	65.7	▲15.6
Liberal Democrats	Judith Helen Cunliffe	182	11.9	▼16.0
Conservative	Gavin Hartley	181	11.8	▼4.4
Green	Nigel Andrew Baldwin	164	10.7	▲4.7
Majority		826	53.8	▲31.6
Turnout		1535	38.3	▲5.1
Labour hold		Swing	▲15.8	

=== Rosegrove with Lowerhouse ward ===
Rosegrove with Lowerhouse
Party	Candidate	Votes	%	±%
BAPIP	Lorraine Bernice Mehanna	574	48.5	▲23.0
Labour	Gail Barton	362	30.6	▼15.5
Green	Barbara Pauline Baldwin	126	10.6	▲3.6
Conservative	Thomas James Watson	122	10.3	▼4.8
Majority		212	17.9	▼2.7
Turnout		1184	24.8	▲0.7
BAPIP gain from Labour		Swing	▲19.3	

=== Rosehill with Burnley Wood ward ===
Rosehill with Burnley Wood
Party	Candidate	Votes	%	±%
Liberal Democrats	Tracy Kennedy	533	41.6	▼6.9
Labour	Margaret Brindle	291	22.4	▼11.4
BAPIP	Dave Alexander	260	20.3	▲20.3
Conservative	Phil Chamberlain	119	9.3	▼3.7
Green	Georgina Hannah Ormrod	78	6.8	▲2.6
Majority		242	18.9	▲6.6
Turnout		1281	28.6	▼2.8
Liberal Democrats gain from Labour		Swing	▲2.3	

=== Trinity ward ===
Trinity
Party	Candidate	Votes	%	±%
Green	Sarah Elizabeth Hall	770	66.5	▲0.7
Labour	Elizabeth Mary Monk	209	18.1	▼6.2
BAPIP	Stephanine Forrest	107	9.2	▲5.4
Liberal Democrats	Jan Weaver	36	3.1	▲3.1
Conservative	Michael Paterson	35	3.0	▼3.3
Majority		561	48.5	▲7.0
Turnout		1157	28.8	▼0.9
Green gain from Labour		Swing	▲3.5	

=== Whittlefield with Ightenhill ===
Whittlefield with Ightenhill
Party	Candidate	Votes	%	±%
BAPIP	Emma Payne	593	33.1	▲9.6
Green	Laura Fisk	590	33.0	▲30.4
Conservative	Donald Whitaker	401	22.4	▼5.0
Labour	Shaun Sproule	147	8.2	▼13.4
Liberal Democrats	Kathryn Haworth	59	3.3	▼14.2
Majority		3	0.2	▼3.7
BAPIP gain from Conservative		Swing	▲2.0	
