= 2015 Burnley Borough Council election =

2015 UK local government election

Results of the 2015 Burnley Borough Council election

Elections to Burnley Borough Council in Lancashire, England were held on 7 May 2015, as part of the wider 2015 United Kingdom local elections.

Due to the 'in thirds' format of elections in Burnley, these elections are for those electoral district wards fought in the 2011 Burnley Borough Council election, with changes in vote share compared directly with that year. These seats were contested again in 2019.

As Jonathan Barker (elected in 2012) resigned before the election, two seats were open in the Hapton with Park Ward.

== State of the Parties ==
After the election, the composition of the council was as follows:

Burnley Council composition 2015

Party	Seats	±
Labour	29	▲1
Liberal Democrat	10	▼2
Conservative	5	Steady
UKIP	1	▲1

== Results ==
Burnley local election result 2015
Party	Seats	Gains	Losses	Net gain/loss	Seats %	Votes %	Votes	+/−
Labour	10	2	1	+1	62.5	37.8	14,738	-8.2
Liberal Democrats	3	0	2	-2	18.75	27.2	10,595	-9.9
Conservative	2	0	0	0	12.5	18.3	7,122	+12.5
UKIP	1	1	0	+1	6.25	14.3	5,577	+5.9
Green	0	0	0	0	0.0	1.8	709	+1.8
TUSC	0	0	0	0	0.0	0.4	155	-0.3
BNP	0	0	0	0	0.0	0.1	42	-2.0

== Ward results ==
Bank Hall
Party	Candidate	Votes	%	±%
Labour	Sobia Malik	1,225	52.3	−18.6
UKIP	Lewis Fraser	571	24.4	+24.4
Liberal Democrats	Susan Fenn	545	23.3	−5.8
Majority		654	27.9	−14.0
Turnout		2,341		
Labour hold		Swing		

Briercliffe
Party	Candidate	Votes	%	±%
Liberal Democrats	Anne Kelly	1,166	39.1	−7.0
UKIP	Ian Metcalf	671	22.5	−5.3
Labour	Brian Cooper	652	21.9	+3.2
Conservative	Susan Nutter	407	13.7	+6.3
Green	MacDonald James	83	2.8	+2.8
Majority		495	16.6	−1.8
Turnout		2,979		
Liberal Democrats hold		Swing		

Brunshaw
Party	Candidate	Votes	%	±%
Labour	Mark Townsend	1,257	45.4	+0.4
UKIP	Jamie McGowan	729	26.3	−9.9
Liberal Democrats	Michele Cryer	437	15.8	−0.9
Conservative	Jane Seed	344	12.4	+12.4
Majority		528	19.1	+10.3
Turnout		2,767		
Labour hold		Swing		

Cliviger with Worsthorne
Party	Candidate	Votes	%	±%
Conservative	Cosima Towneley	1,040	33.1	+1.3
Liberal Democrats	Bill Brindle	760	24.2	−0.8
UKIP	Tom Commis	705	22.4	−2.8
Labour	Andy Devanney	638	20.3	+2.3
Majority		280	8.9	+2.3
Turnout		3,143		
Conservative hold		Swing		

Coal Clough with Deerplay
Party	Candidate	Votes	%	±%
Liberal Democrats	Margaret Brindle	1,151	46.2	−22.5
Labour	Steve Watson	752	30.2	−1.1
UKIP	Blair Bailey	587	23.6	+23.6
Majority		399	16.0	−21.4
Turnout		2,490		
Liberal Democrats hold		Swing		

Daneshouse with Stoneyholme
Party	Candidate	Votes	%	±%
Labour	Wajid Khan	Uncontested	NA	NA
Majority		NA	NA	
Turnout		NA	NA	NA
Labour hold		Swing		

Gannow
Party	Candidate	Votes	%	±%
Liberal Democrats	Charlie Briggs	1,128	44.6	−3.2
Labour	Michael Rushton	861	34.0	−1.0
Conservative	Tom Watson	375	14.8	+7.4
Green	Jane Davis	166	6.6	+6.6
Majority		267	10.5	−2.4
Turnout		2,530		
Liberal Democrats hold		Swing		

Gawthorpe
Party	Candidate	Votes	%	±%
Labour	John Harbour	1,417	58.3	−4.7
Conservative	Barrie Bamford	530	21.8	+1.3
Liberal Democrats	John Mithcell	485	19.9	+3.4
Majority		887	36.5	−8.0
Turnout		2,432		
Labour hold		Swing		

Hapton with Park
Party	Candidate	Votes	%	±%
Labour	Joanne Greenwood	996	21.0	NA
UKIP	Alan Hosker	964	20.3	NA
Labour	Howard Hudson	726	15.3	NA
Liberal Democrats	Sandra Byrne	519	10.9	
Conservative	Ian Dawes	504	10.6	NA
Conservative	Ivor Emo	391	8.2	NA
Liberal Democrats	Stephanie Forrest	385	8.1	NA
Green	Ceri Carmichael	256	5.4	NA
Majority		32	NA	NA
Turnout		4,741	NA	NA
Labour hold		Swing	NA	
UKIP gain from Labour		Swing	NA	

Lanehead
Party	Candidate	Votes	%	±%
Labour	Ann Royle	1,308	45.7	−12.7
Liberal Democrats	Debbie Porter	594	20.8	−20.8
UKIP	Ray Hogan	554	19.4	+19.4
Conservative	Daniel Hanson	405	14.2	+14.2
Majority		714	25.0	+8.2
Turnout		2,861		
Labour hold		Swing		

Queensgate
Party	Candidate	Votes	%	±%
Labour	Mohammed Ishtiaq	1,298	51.2	−16.3
Liberal Democrats	Paula Riley	827	32.6	+0.1
Conservative	Joe Whittaker	255	10.1	+10.1
TUSC	Gavin Hartley	155	6.1	+6.1
Majority		471	18.6	−16.4
Turnout		2,535		
Labour gain from Liberal Democrats		Swing		

Rosegrove with Lowerhouse
Party	Candidate	Votes	%	±%
Labour	Paul Reynolds	1,039	45.8	−7.9
UKIP	Mark Girven	624	27.5	+27.5
Liberal Democrats	Barbara Kirker	486	21.4	−3.2
Green	Joe Davis	77	3.4	+3.4
BNP	John Rowe	42	1.8	−20.0
Majority		415	18.3	−10.3
Turnout		2,268		
Labour hold		Swing		

Rosehill with Burnley Wood
Party	Candidate	Votes	%	±%
Labour	Danny Fleming	878	33.0	−2.8
Liberal Democrats	Kathryn Haworth	871	32.7	−31.5
UKIP	Annette McGowan-Doe	550	20.7	+20.7
Conservative	Narayana Devi	236	8.9	+8.9
Green	Tony Davis	127	4.8	+4.8
Majority		7	0.3	
Turnout		2,662		
Labour gain from Liberal Democrats		Swing		

Trinity
Party	Candidate	Votes	%	±%
Labour	Liz Monk	950	48.3	−7.8
UKIP	Norman White	509	25.9	+25.9
Liberal Democrats	Stewart Bone	506	25.7	−5.4
Majority		441	22.4	−2.6
Turnout		1,965		
Labour hold		Swing		

Whittlefield with Ightenhill
Party	Candidate	Votes	%	±%
Conservative	Ida Carmichael	1,090	33.8	+18.6
Labour	John Fifield	741	23.0	+1.1
Liberal Democrats	Kate Mottershead	735	22.8	−11.5
UKIP	Christopher Rawson	658	20.4	−8.2
Majority		349	10.8	
Turnout		3,224		
Conservative hold		Swing		
