= 2022 Burnley Borough Council election =

2022 local election results in Burnley

The 2022 Burnley Borough Council election took place on 5 May 2022 to elect members of Burnley Borough Council in England. This election was held on the same day as other local elections.

== Results summary ==
Party	Councillors			Votes	
Party	Elected	Of total	Full Council		Of total
Labour Party	7	46.7%	18 / 45	7,934	38.9%
Conservative Party	2	13.3%	8 / 45	5,316	26.1%
Green Party	2	13.3%	6 / 45	3,387	16.6%
Liberal Democrats	3	20.0%	8 / 45	2,611	12.8%
Burnley and Padiham Independent Party	1	6.7%	5 / 45	1,101	5.4%
Independent	0	0.0%	0 / 45	34	0.2%

== Ward results ==
=== Bank Hall ===
Bank Hall
Party	Candidate	Votes	%	±%
Labour	Afrasiab Anwar	977	75.2	+8.3
Conservative	Susan Nutter	196	15.1	−6.9
Green	Julie Hurt	126	9.7	−1.4
Majority		781	60.1	
Turnout		1,299	31.2	
Labour hold		Swing	▲7.6	

=== Briercliffe ===
Briercliffe
Party	Candidate	Votes	%	±%
Liberal Democrats	Arthur Gordon Lishman	618	50.5	+0.6
Conservative	Richard Sagar	295	24.1	−5.0
Labour Co-op	Lian Pate	248	20.3	+4.7
Green	Vic Alker	62	5.1	−0.4
Majority		323	26.4	
Turnout		1,223	28.7	
Liberal Democrats hold		Swing	▲2.8	

=== Brunshaw ===
Brunshaw
Party	Candidate	Votes	%	±%
Labour	Christine Sollis	526	41.9	+14.0
Green	Alex Hall	456	36.4	−2.3
Conservative	Claire Ingham	272	21.7	−11.7
Majority		70	5.5	
Turnout		1,254	27.0	
Labour hold		Swing	▲8.2	

=== Cliviger with Worsthorne ===
Cliviger with Worsthorne
Party	Candidate	Votes	%	±%
Green	Jack Launer	892	47.6	+0.5
Conservative	Ivor Emo	881	47.0	+9.8
Labour	Nussrat Kazmi	100	5.3	−2.2
Majority		11	0.6	
Turnout		1,873	44.2	
Green gain from Conservative		Swing	▼4.7	

=== Coalclough with Deerplay ===
Coalclough with Deerplay
Party	Candidate	Votes	%	±%
Liberal Democrats	Gordon Birtwistle	840	60.0	+23.5
Labour	Bill Horrocks	283	20.2	−2.9
Conservative	Linda Whittaker	221	15.8	−7.4
Green	Janet Hall	57	4.1	−0.2
Majority		557	39.8	
Turnout		1,401	36.3	
Liberal Democrats hold		Swing	▲13.2	

=== Daneshouse with Stoneyholme ===
Daneshouse with Stoneyholme
Party	Candidate	Votes	%	±%
Labour	Shah Hussain	1,401	86.9	+16.3
Liberal Democrats	Mohammed Haji-Nazrul	121	7.5	−16.1
Conservative	Josh Gillies	53	3.3	−0.3
Green	Craig Simpkin	38	2.4	+0.2
Majority		1,280	79.4	
Turnout		1,613	35.3	
Labour hold		Swing	▲16.2	

=== Gannow ===
Gannow
Party	Candidate	Votes	%	±%
BAPIP	Neil Mottershead	506	44.5	+4.1
Labour	Fiona Wild	385	33.9	+11.8
Conservative	Thomas Watson	145	12.8	−7.1
Green	Helen Bridges	101	8.9	−3.2
Majority		121	10.6	
Turnout		1,137	26.5	
BAPIP hold		Swing	▼3.9	

=== Gawthorpe ===
Gawthorpe
Party	Candidate	Votes	%	±%
Labour	Alun Lewis	719	59.5	+21.3
Conservative	Nicola Thompson	412	34.1	−21.9
Green	Joe Davis	78	6.5	+0.7
Majority		307	25.4	
Turnout		1,209	27.2	
Labour hold		Swing	▲21.6	

=== Hapton with Park ===
Hapton with Park
Party	Candidate	Votes	%	±%
Conservative	Jamie McGowan	969	67.0	−6.8
Labour	Abdul Salek	305	21.1	+1.1
Green	Duncan Reed	172	11.9	+5.7
Majority		664	45.9	
Turnout		1,446	31.0	
Conservative hold		Swing	▼4.0	

=== Lanehead ===
Lanehead
Party	Candidate	Votes	%	±%
Labour	Sue Graham	736	55.9	+5.8
Conservative	Tom Commis	319	24.2	−14.5
Liberal Democrats	Pippa Lishman	199	15.1	N/A
Green	Mark Alker	63	4.8	−6.5
Majority		417	31.7	
Turnout		1,317	28.8	
Labour hold		Swing	▲10.2	

=== Queensgate ===
Queensgate
Party	Candidate	Votes	%	±%
Labour	Syeda Kazmi	929	68.0	+3.5
Conservative	Bailey Webster	318	23.3	−2.6
Green	Jai Redman	120	8.8	−0.7
Majority		611	44.7	
Turnout		1,367	32.7	
Labour hold		Swing	▲3.1	

=== Rosegrove with Lowerhouse ===
Rosegrove with Lowerhouse
Party	Candidate	Votes	%	±%
Labour	Gail Barton	530	41.4	+10.9
BAPIP	James Anderson	320	25.0	−2.7
Conservative	Maison McGowan-Doe	309	24.2	−3.6
Liberal Democrats	Peter McCann	63	4.9	−3.7
Green	Jane Davis	57	4.5	−0.9
Majority		210	16.4	
Turnout		1,279	25.6	
Labour hold		Swing	▲6.8	

=== Rosehill with Burnley Wood ===
Rosehill with Burnley Wood
Party	Candidate	Votes	%	±%
Liberal Democrats	Jeff Sumner	770	56.2	+27.7
Labour	Margaret Brindle	323	23.6	−7.3
Conservative	Kev Shackell	207	15.1	−16.5
Green	Tony Davis	70	5.1	−3.9
Majority		447	32.6	
Turnout		1,370	30.6	
Liberal Democrats hold		Swing	▲17.5	

=== Trinity ===
Trinity
Party	Candidate	Votes	%	±%
Green	Andy Fewings	635	66.7	+9.3
Labour	Stephen Reynolds	228	23.9	+2.0
Conservative	Dale Ferrier	89	9.3	−5.4
Majority		407	42.8	
Turnout		952	23.9	
Green hold		Swing	▲3.7	

=== Whittlefield with Ightenhill ===
Whittlefield with Ightenhill
Party	Candidate	Votes	%	±%
Conservative	Mike Steel	630	38.3	+1.5
Green	Andrew Newhouse	460	28.0	+1.5
BAPIP	Nicola Sedgwick	275	16.7	−2.8
Labour	Shaun Sproule	244	14.9	+3.5
Independent	Mitchell Cryer	34	2.1	N/A
Majority		170	10.3	
Turnout		1,643	35.8	
Conservative hold		Swing	N/A	
