= 2014 Burnley Borough Council election =

2014 UK local government election

Results of the 2014 Burnley Borough Council election

Elections to Burnley Borough Council in Lancashire, England were held on 22 May 2014, as part of the wider 2014 UK local elections and the United Kingdom component of the 2014 European Parliament election.

Due to the 'in thirds' format of elections in Burnley, these elections are for those electoral district wards fought in the 2010 Burnley Borough Council election, with changes in vote share compared directly with that year. These seats were contested again in 2018.

The Labour Party retained control of the Council. After the election Julie Cooper stood-down from the role of council leader to focus on campaigning in the 2015 General Election, being replaced by Mark Townsend.

== State of the Parties ==
After the election, the composition of the council was

- Labour 28
- Liberal Democrats 12
- Conservative 5

== Results ==
Burnley local election result 2014
Party	Seats	Gains	Losses	Net gain/loss	Seats %	Votes %	Votes	+/−
Labour	9	3	0	+3	60.0	46.0	9,923	-6.7
Liberal Democrats	5	0	3	-3	33.3	37.1	8,005	+3.6
Conservative	1	0	0	0	6.7	5.8	1,251	+0.2
UKIP	0	0	0	0	0.0	8.4	1,819	+5.5
BNP	0	0	0	0	0.0	2.1	446	-3.2
Trade Unionist and Socialist Coalition	0	0	0	0	0.0	0.7	148	+0.7

== Ward results ==
Bank Hall
Party	Candidate	Votes	%	±%
Labour	Gary Frayling	925	70.9	−9.5
Liberal Democrats	Brian Tomlinson	379	29.1	+9.5
Majority		546	41.9	−19.0
Turnout		1304	30.2	+1.1
Labour hold		Swing		

Briercliffe
Party	Candidate	Votes	%	±%
Liberal Democrats	Roger Frost	682	46.1	−12.8
UKIP	Ian Metcalf	410	27.8	+27.8
Labour	Brian Cooper	277	18.7	−13.1
Conservative	Susan Nutter	110	7.4	−3.8
Majority		272	18.4	−7.2
Turnout		1479	32.7	+3.3
Liberal Democrats hold		Swing		

Brunshaw
Party	Candidate	Votes	%	±%
Labour Co-op	Tony Harrison	621	45.0	−21.4
UKIP	Jamie McGowan	500	36.2	+36.2
Liberal Democrats	Susan Fenn	231	16.7	−16.9
TUSC	Carme McDevitt	29	2.1	+2.1
Majority		125	8.8	−24.1
Turnout		1381	28.5	+1.9
Labour hold		Swing		

Cliviger with Worsthorne
Party	Candidate	Votes	%	±%
Conservative	David Heginbotham	524	31.8	+2.6
UKIP	Tom Commis	415	25.2	+6.1
Liberal Democrats	Paula Riley	411	25.0	−3.3
Labour	Christine Sollis	297	18.0	−5.4
Majority		109	6.6	+5.6
Turnout		1647	38.6	+2.3
Conservative hold		Swing		

Coal Clough with Deerplay
Party	Candidate	Votes	%	±%
Liberal Democrats	Gordon Birtwistle	923	68.7	+8.0
Labour	Daniel Fleming	421	31.3	−8.0
Majority		502	37.4	+15.7
Turnout		1344	31.5	+3.0
Liberal Democrats hold		Swing		

Daneshouse with Stoneyholme
Party	Candidate	Votes	%	±%
Labour	Shah Hussain	1,421	67.9	+1.8
Liberal Democrats	Rupali Begum	671	32.1	−1.8
Majority		750	35.9	+3.7
Turnout		2092	52.6	−8.9
Labour hold		Swing		

Gannow
Party	Candidate	Votes	%	±%
Liberal Democrats	Neil Mottershead	728	47.8	+11.9
Labour	Howard Hudson	532	35.0	−18.7
BNP	John Rowe	149	9.8	−0.6
Conservative	Phillip Nutter	113	7.4	+7.4
Majority		196	12.9	
Turnout		1522	34.7	+4.4
Liberal Democrats hold		Swing		

Gawthorpe
Party	Candidate	Votes	%	±%
Labour	Frank Cant	739	63.0	−10.0
Conservative	Tom Watson	241	20.5	+20.5
Liberal Democrats	John Mithcell	193	16.5	+4.6
Majority		498	42.5	−17.4
Turnout		1173	25.7	−1.2
Labour hold		Swing		

Hapton with Park
Party	Candidate	Votes	%	±%
Labour	Jean Cunningham	728	57.9	+7.8
Liberal Democrats	Sandra Byrne	529	42.1	+24.6
Majority		199	15.8	−5.9
Turnout		1257	28.7	−1.4
Labour hold		Swing		

Lanehead
Party	Candidate	Votes	%	±%
Labour	Trish Ellis	893	58.4	+6.5
Liberal Democrats	Gordon Lishman	636	41.6	+12.7
Majority		257	16.8	−6.2
Turnout		1529	35.5	−0.5
Labour gain from Liberal Democrats		Swing		

Queensgate
Party	Candidate	Votes	%	±%
Labour	Sue Graham	908	67.5	+8.2
Liberal Democrats	Tom Wilkinson	437	32.5	−8.2
Majority		471	35.0	+16.5
Turnout		1345	32.6	−6.6
Labour gain from Liberal Democrats		Swing		

Rosegrove with Lowerhouse
Party	Candidate	Votes	%	±%
Labour	Bea Foster	723	53.7	−0.2
Liberal Democrats	Barbara Kirker	335	24.6	−10.2
BNP	Christopher Vanns	297	21.8	+10.5
Majority		388	28.6	+9.5
Turnout		1355	28.6	+1.0
Labour gain from Liberal Democrats		Swing		

Rosehill with Burnley Wood
Party	Candidate	Votes	%	±%
Liberal Democrats	Jeff Sumner	970	64.2	+24.1
Labour	Michael Rushton	541	35.8	−13.8
Majority		429	28.4	
Turnout		1511	34.1	+1.6
Liberal Democrats hold		Swing		

Trinity
Party	Candidate	Votes	%	±%
Labour	Howard Baker	518	56.1	−1.9
Liberal Democrats	Paul Harrison	287	31.1	−0.3
TUSC	David Baynes	119	12.8	+12.8
Majority		231	25.0	−1.6
Turnout		924	23.9	+0.1
Labour hold		Swing		

Whittlefield with Ightenhill
Party	Candidate	Votes	%	±%
Liberal Democrats	Tom Porter	593	34.3	+5.6
UKIP	Christopher Rawson	494	28.6	+28.6
Labour	Charles Baker	379	21.9	−8.7
Conservative	Robert Frost	263	15.2	−15.9
Majority		99	5.7	
Turnout		1729	35.8	+3.9
Liberal Democrats hold		Swing		
