= James Astin =

English footballer

Personal information
- Date of birth: 16 August 1900
- Place of birth: Hapton, England
- Date of death: 1979 (aged 78–79)
- Position: Full back

Senior career*
Years	Team	Apps	(Gls)
1921–1922	Burnley	13	(0)
1922–1923	Bury	0	(0)
- * Club domestic league appearances and goals

James Astin (16 August 1900 – 1979) was an English professional footballer who played as a full back.

Born in Hapton, Lancashire, Astin joined Football League First Division club Burnley from the British Army in the summer of 1921. He made his league debut on 10 December 1921 in the 1–0 win over Huddersfield Town. Astin then spent a period of time out of the side before returning to the team for the 1–0 victory over Bolton Wanderers on 18 February 1922. He played the following 12 consecutive matches, his last appearance for Burnley coming on 17 April 1922 in the 1–2 defeat away at Liverpool. He joined Bury at the start of the 1922–23 season, but failed to play a game for his new club before retiring from football at the end of the campaign.
