= 2016 Burnley Borough Council election =

2016 UK local government election

2016 local election results in Burnley

The 2016 Burnley Borough Council election took place on 5 May 2016 to elect members of Burnley Borough Council in England. This was on the same day as other local elections. One third of the council was up for election, with each successful candidate serving a four-year term of office, expiring in 2020. These seats were last contested in 2012.

Labour remained in overall control of the council.

== State of the Parties ==
After the election, the composition of the Council was as follows:

Burnley Council composition 2016

Party	Seats	±
Labour	27	▼3
Liberal Democrat	13	▲3
Conservative	4	▼1
UKIP	1	▲1

== Results ==
Burnley Borough Council Election, 2016
Party	Seats	Gains	Losses	Net gain/loss	Seats %	Votes %	Votes	+/−
Labour	8	0	3	-3	53.3	44.3	8,873	+6.5
Liberal Democrats	5	3	0	+3	33.3	32.4	6,481	+5.2
UKIP	1	1	0	+1	6.7	11.5	2,303	-2.8
Conservative	1	0	1	-1	6.7	6.1	1,227	-12.2
Green	0	0	0	0	0.0	4.0	806	+2.2
TUSC	0	0	0	0	0.0	0.8	163	+0.4
BNP	0	0	0	0	0.0	0.8	158	+0.7

=== By ward ===
==== Bank Hall ward ====
Bank Hall
Party	Candidate	Votes	%	±%
Labour	Lubna Khan	768	64.8	+12.5
Liberal Democrats	Peter Michael Bradley	417	35.2	+11.9
Majority		351	29.6	+1.7
Turnout		1,185	29.8	
Labour hold		Swing		

==== Briercliffe ward ====
Briercliffe
Party	Candidate	Votes	%	±%
Liberal Democrats	Margaret Ann Lishman	764	57.2	+18.1
UKIP	Ian Metcalf	261	19.5	−3.0
Labour	Syd Khan	176	13.2	−8.7
Conservative	Tom Watson	99	7.4	−6.3
Green	James MacDonald	36	2.7	−0.1
Majority		503	37.6	+21.0
Turnout		1,336	30.8	
Liberal Democrats hold		Swing		

==== Brunshaw ward ====
Brunshaw
Party	Candidate	Votes	%	±%
Labour	Lian Pate	600	48.6	+3.2
UKIP	Jamie McGowan	452	36.6	+10.3
Liberal Democrats	Sandra Ann Byrne	182	14.7	−1.1
Majority		148	12.0	−7.1
Turnout		1,234	26.0	
Labour hold		Swing		

==== Cliviger with Worsthorne ward ====
Cliviger with Worsthorne
Party	Candidate	Votes	%	±%
Conservative	Andrew Robert Newhouse	539	35.0	+1.9
Liberal Democrats	Kathryn Haworth	358	23.2	−1.0
UKIP	Tom Commis	349	22.6	+0.2
Labour		296	19.2	−1.1
Majority		181	11.7	+2.8
Turnout		1,542	36.6	
Conservative hold		Swing		

==== Coalclough with Deerplay ward ====
Coalclough with Deerplay
Party	Candidate	Votes	%	±%
Liberal Democrats	Bill Brindle	721	65.2	+19.0
Labour	Ibrahim Ali	299	27.0	−3.2
Green	Anne Whittles	86	7.8	+7.8
Majority		422	38.2	22.2
Turnout		1,106	28.4	
Liberal Democrats hold		Swing		

==== Daneshouse with Stoneyholme ward ====
Daneshouse with Stoneyholme
Party	Candidate	Votes	%	±%
Labour	Saeed Akhtar Chaudhary	1,350	87.7	N/A
Liberal Democrats	Mubashir Aftab	190	12.3	N/A
Majority		1,160	75.3	N/A
Turnout		1,540	41.1	
Labour hold		Swing		

Daneshouse with Stoneyholme returned a Labour Party (UK) councillor unopposed in 2015.

==== Gannow ward ====
Gannow
Party	Candidate	Votes	%	±%
Liberal Democrats	Mark Andrew Charles Payne	680	53.0	+8.4
Labour	Christine Sollis	427	33.3	−0.7
BNP	Christopher Barnett	113	8.8	+8.8
Green	Jai Redman	63	4.9	+4.9
Majority		253	19.7	+9.2
Turnout		1,283	31.2	
Liberal Democrats gain from Labour		Swing		

==== Gawthorpe ward ====
Gawthorpe
Party	Candidate	Votes	%	±%
Labour	Andy Tatchell	809	66.9	+8.6
Liberal Democrats	Brendan John Morris	400	33.1	+13.2
Majority		409	33.8	−2.7
Turnout		1,209	28.0	
Labour hold		Swing		

==== Hapton with Park ward ====
Hapton with Park
Party	Candidate	Votes	%	±%
UKIP	Alan Hosker	683	44.4	+24.1
Labour	Howard Leigh Hudson	601	39.1	+2.8
Conservative	Ivor Christopher Emo	173	11.2	−7.6
Liberal Democrats	Leslie Williams	81	5.3	−13.7
Majority		82	5.3	
Turnout		1,538	34.1	
UKIP gain from Labour		Swing		

==== Lanehead ward ====
Lanehead
Party	Candidate	Votes	%	±%
Labour	Asif Raja	792	47.8	+2.1
Liberal Democrats	Paula Christine Riley	665	40.2	+19.4
Green	Laura Fisk	199	12.0	+12.0
Majority		127	7.7	−17.7
Turnout		1,656	37.4	
Labour hold		Swing		

==== Queensgate ward ====
Queensgate
Party	Candidate	Votes	%	±%
Labour	Arif Khan	811	57.4	+6.2
Liberal Democrats	Arthur Gordon Lishman	438	31.0	−1.6
TUSC	Gavin Hartley	163	11.5	+5.4
Majority		373	26.4	+7.8
Turnout		1,412	35.9	
Labour hold		Swing		

==== Rosegrove with Lowerhouse ward ====
Rosegrove with Lowerhouse
Party	Candidate	Votes	%	±%
Labour	Marcus Johnstone	590	49.5	+0.7
UKIP	Mark Henry Girven	278	23.3	−4.2
Liberal Democrats	Stephanie Forrest	221	18.6	−2.8
Green	Ceri Jane Carmichael	57	4.8	+1.4
BNP	Christopher Vanns	45	3.8	+2.0
Majority		312	26.2	+7.9
Turnout		1,191	26.4	
Labour hold		Swing		

==== Rosehill with Burnley Wood ward ====
Rosehill with Burnley Wood
Party	Candidate	Votes	%	±%
Liberal Democrats	Christine Eleanor White	625	47.2	+14.5
Labour	Paul Campbell	587	44.3	+11.3
Green	Georgina Hannah Ormrod	112	8.5	+3.7
Majority		38	2.9	+2.6
Turnout		1,324	30.9	
Liberal Democrats gain from Labour		Swing		

==== Trinity ward ====
Trinity
Party	Candidate	Votes	%	±%
Labour Co-op	Tony Martin	452	49.8	+1.5
Liberal Democrats	Stewart Bone	236	26.0	−0.3
Green	Andy Fewings	219	24.1	+24.1
Majority		216	23.8	+1.4
Turnout		907	24.1	
Labour hold		Swing		

==== Whittlefield with Ightenhill ward ====
Whittlefield with Ightenhill
Party	Candidate	Votes	%	±%
Liberal Democrats	David Roper	503	32.5	+9.7
Conservative	Tony Moores	416	26.9	−6.9
Labour	Andy Devanney	316	20.4	−2.6
UKIP	Chris Rawson	280	18.1	−2.3
Green	Alfie Jones	34	2.2	+2.2
Majority		87	5.6	−5.2
Turnout		1,548	33.5	
Liberal Democrats gain from Conservative		Swing		
