= 2008 Burnley Borough Council election =

2008 UK local government election

Results of the 2008 Burnley Borough Council election

Elections to Burnley Borough Council in Lancashire, England were held on 1 May 2008. One third of the council was up for election and the Liberal Democrat party gained overall control of the council from no overall control.

Police launched an investigation on the day of the election into a fake Liberal Democrat leaflet which was distributed in Rosegrove and Gannow wards. Following the election the Labour group leader Andy Tatchell was replaced by Julie Cooper.

After the election, the composition of the council was

- Liberal Democrat 23
- Labour 12
- Conservative 6
- British National Party 4

== Election result ==
Burnley local election result 2008
Party	Seats	Gains	Losses	Net gain/loss	Seats %	Votes %	Votes	+/−
Liberal Democrats	9	5	0	+5	60.0	37.3	9,156	+3.1
Labour	3	0	5	-5	20.0	27.8	6,833	+0.5
Conservative	2	0	0	0	13.3	18.9	4,648	+3.5
BNP	1	0	0	0	6.7	14.9	3,650	-2.6
England First	0	0	0	0	0	1.0	254	-2.1

== Ward results ==
Bank Hall
Party	Candidate	Votes	%	±%
Labour	Julie Cooper	621	43.5	−3.4
Liberal Democrats	Asif Raja	571	40.0	−0.8
Conservative	Paul Coates	237	16.6	+4.3
Majority		50	3.5	−2.6
Turnout		1,429	33.9	
Labour hold		Swing		

Briercliffe
Party	Candidate	Votes	%	±%
Liberal Democrats	Margaret Lishman	912	55.5	−3.2
BNP	Patricia Thomson	326	19.9	−8.2
Conservative	Susan Nutter	219	13.3	+7.0
Labour	Laurence Embley	185	11.3	+1.2
Majority		586	35.6	+5.1
Turnout		1,642	35.7	
Liberal Democrats hold		Swing		

Brunshaw
Party	Candidate	Votes	%	±%
Liberal Democrats	Linda White	633	37.2	−0.9
Labour	David Halsall	451	26.5	−1.5
BNP	Paul McDevitt	384	22.6	−3.6
Conservative	Arthur Coates	233	13.7	+6.0
Majority		182	10.7	+0.1
Turnout		1,701	34.1	
Liberal Democrats gain from Labour		Swing		

Cliviger with Worsthorne
Party	Candidate	Votes	%	±%
Conservative	Michael Heys	923	45.6	+7.6
Liberal Democrats	Paula Riley	486	24.0	+14.4
England First	Steven Smith	254	12.5	−4.3
Labour	Brenda Lambert	214	10.6	+0.4
BNP	Ben Smalley	149	7.4	−4.4
Majority		437	21.6	+0.4
Turnout		2,026	46.2	
Conservative hold		Swing		

Coalclough with Deerplay
Party	Candidate	Votes	%	±%
Liberal Democrats	Charles Bullas	953	66.6	−13.3
BNP	Scott Atkinson	274	19.1	+19.1
Labour	Joanne Whitaker	205	14.3	−5.8
Majority		679	47.5	−12.3
Turnout		1,432	35.0	
Liberal Democrats hold		Swing		

Daneshouse with Stoneyholme
Party	Candidate	Votes	%	±%
Liberal Democrats	Mohammed Malik	1,234	52.4	+12.4
Labour	Shah Hussain	1,123	47.6	−12.4
Majority		111	4.8	
Turnout		2,357	60.4	
Liberal Democrats gain from Labour		Swing		

Gannow
Party	Candidate	Votes	%	±%
Liberal Democrats	Justin Birtwistle	544	33.7	+0.7
BNP	John Cave	473	29.3	+0.8
Labour	Mark Townsend	386	23.9	−2.4
Conservative	Sharon Everitt	212	13.1	+0.9
Majority		71	4.4	−0.1
Turnout		1,615	36.9	
Liberal Democrats gain from Labour		Swing		

Gawthorpe
Party	Candidate	Votes	%	±%
Labour	Andy Tatchell	727	50.0	−3.1
BNP	Christopher Vanns	289	19.9	−5.3
Conservative	Barry Robinson	284	19.5	+7.0
Liberal Democrats	Denise Embra	154	10.6	+1.4
Majority		438	30.1	+2.2
Turnout		1,454	31.1	
Labour hold		Swing		

Hapton with Park
Party	Candidate	Votes	%	±%
BNP	Sharon Wilkinson	674	38.6	+0.9
Labour	Jean Cunningham	586	33.6	+3.2
Conservative	Alan Marsden	323	18.5	+3.4
Liberal Democrats	Vincent McCrae	162	9.3	−7.4
Majority		78	5.0	−2.3
Turnout		1,745	37.5	
BNP hold		Swing		

Lanehead
Party	Candidate	Votes	%	±%
Liberal Democrats	Bill Brindle	852	56.1	+13.5
Labour	Peter Kenyon	357	23.5	−1.0
Conservative	Michael Raistrick	309	20.4	+7.8
Majority		495	32.6	+14.4
Turnout		1,518	33.5	
Liberal Democrats hold		Swing		

Queensgate
Party	Candidate	Votes	%	±%
Liberal Democrats	Bill Bennett	740	47.2	+15.7
Labour	Abid Sharif	571	36.4	+8.6
Conservative	Brent Whittam	256	16.3	+1.2
Majority		169	10.8	+7.1
Turnout		1,567	37.1	
Liberal Democrats hold		Swing		

Rosegrove with Lowerhouse
Party	Candidate	Votes	%	±%
Liberal Democrats	Lynne Briggs	637	40.2	+11.9
BNP	John Rowe	491	31.0	+0.3
Labour	Marion Smith	293	18.5	−12.2
Conservative	Peter Raistrick	164	10.3	+0.0
Majority		146	9.2	
Turnout		1,585	33.6	
Liberal Democrats gain from Labour		Swing		

Rosehill with Burnley Wood
Party	Candidate	Votes	%	±%
Liberal Democrats	Karen Heseltine	742	52.6	+17.1
Labour	Colette Bailey	353	25.0	−4.0
Conservative	David Tierney	316	22.4	+5.8
Majority		389	27.6	+21.2
Turnout		1,411	31.4	
Liberal Democrats gain from Labour		Swing		

Trinity
Party	Candidate	Votes	%	±%
Labour	Tony Lambert	497	42.4	+2.6
BNP	David Shapcott	283	24.2	−4.4
Liberal Democrats	Martyn Hurt	244	20.8	−3.3
Conservative	Thomas Picton	147	12.6	+5.1
Majority		214	18.2	+7.0
Turnout		1,171	30.0	
Labour hold		Swing		

Whittlefield with Ightenhill
Party	Candidate	Votes	%	±%
Conservative	Peter Doyle	1,025	54.3	+0.8
BNP	Joan Shapcott	307	16.3	+0.0
Liberal Democrats	Michael McHugh	292	15.5	+1.5
Labour	Angela Donovan	264	14.0	−2.2
Majority		718	38.0	
Turnout		1,888	38.7	+1.6
Conservative hold		Swing		
