= 2011 Burnley Borough Council election =

2011 UK local government election

Results of the 2011 Burnley Borough Council election

Elections to Burnley Borough Council in Lancashire, England were held on 5 May 2011. One third of the council was up for election and no party won overall control of the council. Arif Khan, the incumbent in the Queensgate ward, defected form the Lib Dems to Labour in October 2010, citing disillusionment with the party's performance since the general election. The councils only independent, John Jones (former Lib Dem), the incumbent in the Brunshaw ward, did not stand for re-election.

After the election, the composition of the council was

- Liberal Democrat 21
- Labour 16
- Conservative 5
- British National Party 1

== Election result ==
Burnley local election result 2011
Party	Seats	Gains	Losses	Net gain/loss	Seats %	Votes %	Votes	+/−
Labour	8	3	0	3	53.4	46.7	12,166	+17.5
Liberal Democrats	5	0	1	-1	33.3	32.6	8,490	-7.3
Conservative	2	0	0	0	13.3	14.2	3,684	-6.0
BNP	0	0	1	-1	0.0	5.9	1,549	-4.9
UKIP	0	0	0	0	0	0.5	145	+0.5
Independent	0	0	1	-1	0	0.0	0	0

== Ward results ==
Bank Hall
Party	Candidate	Votes	%	±%
Labour	John Field	1,157	77.5	+31.8
Liberal Democrats	Arthur Gordon Lisman	336	22.5	−13.7
Majority		821	55.0	+41.2
Turnout		1,493	35.2	
Labour hold		Swing		

Briercliffe
Party	Candidate	Votes	%	±%
Liberal Democrats	Anne Kelly	1,004	55.0	−3.9
Labour	Brian Cooper	514	28.1	+8.9
Conservative	Susan Nutter	308	16.9	−5.0
Majority		490	26.8	−10.2
Turnout		1,826	40.2	
Liberal Democrats hold		Swing		

Brunshaw
Party	Candidate	Votes	%	±%
Labour	Mark Townsend	1,090	61.9	+29.2
Liberal Democrats	Kathryn Howarth	376	21.3	−10.9
Conservative	Alex Harrison	296	16.8	+0.0
Majority		714	40.5	+40.1
Turnout		1,762	36.0	
Labour gain from Independent		Swing		

Cliviger with Worsthorne
Party	Candidate	Votes	%	±%
Conservative	Cosima Towneley	993	46.9	−1.4
Liberal Democrats	Paula Riley	570	26.9	−6.8
Labour	Tony Martin	556	26.2	+8.2
Majority		423	20.0	+5.4
Turnout		2,119	47.7	
Conservative hold		Swing		

Coalclough with Deerplay
Party	Candidate	Votes	%	±%
Liberal Democrats	Margaret Brindle	750	47.3	−8.5
Labour	Alex McClachlan	486	30.6	+10.9
Conservative	Anthony Jackson	209	13.2	−0.8
BNP	Angela Vanns	142	8.9	−1.6
Majority		246	16.6	−19.5
Turnout		1,587	38.7	
Liberal Democrats hold		Swing		

Daneshouse with Stoneyholme
Party	Candidate	Votes	%	±%
Labour	Wajid Khan	1,694	75.7	+18.7
Liberal Democrats	Abdul Rakib	544	24.3	−15.0
Majority		1150	51.4	+33.7
Turnout		2,238	58.9	
Labour hold		Swing		

Gannow
Party	Candidate	Votes	%	±%
Liberal Democrats	Charlie Briggs	650	41.5	+8.1
Labour	Stephen Large	555	35.4	+6.1
BNP	David Shapcott	186	11.9	−8.5
Conservative	Barry Robinson	176	11.2	−5.7
Majority		95	6.1	+2.1
Turnout		1,567	35.9	
Liberal Democrats hold		Swing		

Gawthorpe
Party	Candidate	Votes	%	±%
Labour	John Harbour	962	59.8	+21.6
Liberal Democrats	David Matthew Carter	341	21.2	+0.9
BNP	Paul Robinson	305	19.0	−1.8
Majority		621	38.6	+21.1
Turnout		1,608	34.4	
Labour hold		Swing		

Hapton with Park
Party	Candidate	Votes	%	±%
Labour	Joanne Greenwood	871	49.2	+20.0
BNP	Derek Dawson	369	20.8	−3.3
Conservative	Victoria Taylor	323	18.3	−1.3
Liberal Democrats	Claire McCann	207	11.7	−15.4
Majority		502	28.4	+24.2
Turnout		1,770	37.9	
Labour gain from BNP		Swing		

Lanehead
Party	Candidate	Votes	%	±%
Labour	Ann Royle	797	43.2	+9.5
Liberal Democrats	Martin Smith	676	36.6	−10.1
Conservative	Paul Coats	228	12.3	−7.2
UKIP	Michael McHugh	145	7.9	+7.9
Majority		121	6.6	
Turnout		1,846	41.1	
Labour gain from Liberal Democrats		Swing		

Queensgate
Party	Candidate	Votes	%	±%
Liberal Democrats	Janet Brown	918	50.6	+1.4
Labour	Arif Khan	895	49.4	+17.9
Majority		23	1.3	
Turnout		1,813	43.2	
Liberal Democrats hold		Swing		

Rosegrove with Lowerhouse
Party	Candidate	Votes	%	±%
Labour	Shephen Paul Reynolds	643	41.8	+10.5
Liberal Democrats	Kate Mottershead	491	32.0	−1.4
BNP	Paul McDevitt	238	15.5	−2.9
Conservative	Mathew Isherwood	164	10.7	−6.2
Majority		152	9.9	
Turnout		1,536	31.8	
Labour hold		Swing		

Rosehill with Burnley Wood
Party	Candidate	Votes	%	±%
Liberal Democrats	Tracy Kennedy	817	48.4	+5.4
Labour	Paul Campbell	691	40.9	+13.2
BNP	Christopher Vanns	180	10.7	−1.7
Majority		126	7.5	−7.8
Turnout		1,688	38.1	
Liberal Democrats hold		Swing		

Trinity
Party	Candidate	Votes	%	±%
Labour	Elizabeth Monk	669	56.6	+22.2
Liberal Democrats	Martyn Hurt	246	20.7	−13.7
Conservative	Thomas Picton	140	11.8	−3.9
BNP	Christopher John Vanns	129	10.9	−4.6
Majority		423	35.7	+35.7
Turnout		1,148	30	
Labour hold		Swing		

Whittlefield with Ightenhill
Party	Candidate	Votes	%	±%
Conservative	Ida Carmichael	847	42.4	+8.9
Labour	Nicolas Madden	586	29.3	+8.2
Liberal Democrats	Debbie Porter	564	28.3	−5.7
Majority		261	13.1	
Turnout		1,997	41.6	
Conservative hold		Swing		
