= Burnley and Padiham Independent Party =

The Burnley and Padiham Independent Party was a registered political party in the United Kingdom between 2017 and 2023, focused on the neighbouring Lancashire towns of Burnley and Padiham.

In 2017, four members of the local Liberal Democrats left the party over its stance on Brexit, to form the Burnley and Padiham Independents.

Neil Mottershead retained his Burnley Borough Council seat in the 2018 election, but in early 2019 Christine White stepped down following claims of harassment from a resident, prompting a by-election which was won by the Lib Dems. Charlie Briggs also retained his seat in 2019, and the party won in the Rosegrove with Lowerhouse and Whittlefield with Ightenhill wards, bringing their total to five councillors.

Briggs also unsuccessfully contested the Parliament constituency in the 2019 United Kingdom general election.

The party disbanded in August 2023. Of the party's three remaining councillors on Burnley Borough Council, Mark Payne and Neil Mottershead then sat as independents, while Charlie Briggs joined Labour.
