= 2018 Burnley Borough Council election =

2018 UK local government election

2018 local election results in Burnley

The 2018 Burnley Borough Council election took place on 3 May 2018 to elect members of Burnley Borough Council in England. This was on the same day as other local elections. One third of the council was up for election, and each successful candidate will serve a four-year term of office, expiring in 2022. These seats were last contested in 2014.

At the start of March 2017, Bill and Margaret Brindle (both Coalclough with Deerplay ward) acrimoniously split with the local Liberal Democrats, but continued to sit on the council as independents. David Roper also left the party and continued as an independent. In November four more Lib Dems (including Neil Mottershead and Mark Payne) left the party over its stance on Brexit, to form the Burnley and Padiham Independent Party.

== State of the Parties ==
The composition of the Council following the election was as follows:

Burnley Council composition 2018

Party	Seats	+/-
Labour	25	▼2
Liberal Democrat	5	▼2
Conservative	5	▲1
BAPIP	4	▲1
Independent	3	Steady
UKIP	2	▲1
Green	1	▲1

== Overall results ==
Burnley Borough Council Election, 2018
Party	Seats	Gains	Losses	Net gain/loss	Seats %	Votes %	Votes	+/−
Labour	7	0	2	-2	46.6	41.3	9,156	-3.0
Liberal Democrats	3	0	2	-2	20.0	14.6	3,237	-17.8
Conservative	2	1	0	+1	13.3	17.8	3,950	+11.7
BAPIP	1	1	0	+1	6.7	8.0	1,782	+8.0
Green	1	1	0	+1	6.7	7.7	1,715	+3.7
UKIP	1	1	0	+1	6.7	5.0	1,118	-6.5
Independent	0	0	0	0	0	0.8	171	+0.8
VPP	0	0	0	0	0	0.1	22	+0.1

== Results by ward ==
=== Bank Hall ward ===
Bank Hall
Party	Candidate	Votes	%	±%
Labour	Afrasiab Anwar	1,096	75.1	+10.3
Conservative	Diane Sunter	228	15.6	−19.6
Green	Martyn Hurt	136	9.3	+9.3
Majority		868	59.5	+29.9
Turnout		1460	34.4	+4.6
Labour hold		Swing	+15.0	

=== Briercliffe ward ===
Briercliffe
Party	Candidate	Votes	%	±%
Liberal Democrats	Gordon Arthur Lishman	667	50.8	−6.4
Labour	Alun Christopher Lewis	292	22.2	+9.0
Conservative	David Neil Heginbotham	235	17.9	+10.5
BAPIP	James Mellor	71	5.4	+5.4
Green	Sarah Elizabeth Hall	48	3.7	+1.0
Majority		375	28.6	−9.0
Turnout		1313	29.4	−1.4
Liberal Democrats hold		Swing	-1.3	

=== Brunshaw ward ===
Brunshaw
Party	Candidate	Votes	%	±%
Labour	Paul Fraser Campbell	648	60.0	+11.4
Conservative	Ellen Rosemary Sunter	287	24.8	+24.8
Independent	Steven Smith	171	14.8	+14.8
Green	Janet Renata Hall	52	4.5	+4.5
Majority		361	31.2	+19.2
Turnout		1158	24.3	−1.7
Labour hold		Swing	-7.7	

=== Cliviger with Worsthorne ward ===
Cliviger with Worsthorne
Party	Candidate	Votes	%	±%
Conservative	Ivor Christopher Emo	1,035	63.5	+28.5
Labour	Andy Devanney	475	29.1	+9.9
Green	Ceri Jane Carmichael	121	7.4	+7.4
Majority		560	34.3	+22.6
Turnout		1631	38.0	+1.4
Conservative hold		Swing	+9.3	

=== Coalclough with Deerplay ward ===
Coalclough with Deerplay
Party	Candidate	Votes	%	±%
Liberal Democrats	Gordon Birtwistle	654	50.3	−15.1
Labour	Bill Horrocks	377	29.0	+2.0
Conservative	Tom Watson	193	14.8	+14.8
Green	Anne Whittles	76	5.8	−2.0
Majority		277	21.3	−16.9
Turnout		1300	32.3	+3.9
Liberal Democrats hold		Swing	-8.6	

=== Daneshouse with Stoneyholme ward ===
Daneshouse with Stoneyholme
Party	Candidate	Votes	%	±%
Labour	Shah Hussain	1,693	91.9	+4.6
Liberal Democrats	Neil Kennedy	74	4.0	−8.3
Green	Alex Hall	42	2.3	+2.3
Conservative	Sheldon Slater	33	1.8	+1.8
Majority		1619	91.6	+16.3
Turnout		1842	44.0	+2.9
Labour hold		Swing	+8.3	

=== Gannow ward ===
Gannow
Party	Candidate	Votes	%	±%
BAPIP	Neil Mottershead	655	50.7	+50.7
Labour	Christine Sollis	390	30.2	−3.1
Conservative	Don Whitaker	152	11.8	+11.8
Liberal Democrats	Kathryn Haworth	70	5.4	−47.6
Green	Jai Redman	25	1.9	−3.0
Majority		275	21.3	+1.6
Turnout		1292	30.7	−0.5
BAPIP gain from Liberal Democrats		Swing	+49.2	

=== Gawthorpe ward ===
Gawthorpe
Party	Candidate	Votes	%	±%
Labour	Frank Cant	463	35.4	−31.5
UKIP	Lenny Johnson	390	29.8	+29.8
Conservative	Phillip James Clarke	212	16.2	+16.2
BAPIP	Brendan John Morris	198	15.1	+15.1
Green	Clare Mary Long-Summers	45	3.4	+3.4
Majority		73	5.6	−28.2
Turnout		1308	29.1	+1.1
Labour hold		Swing	-30.7	

=== Hapton with Park ward ===
Hapton with Park
Party	Candidate	Votes	%	±%
UKIP	Tom Commis	565	36.3	−8.1
Labour	Jean Cunningham	512	32.3	−6.8
Conservative	Ben Thomas Page	213	13.7	+2.5
BAPIP	Dave Alexander	160	10.3	+10.3
Liberal Democrats	Sandra Ann Byrne	84	5.4	+0.1
Green	Stephen Murphy	24	1.5	+1.5
Majority		53	3.4	−1.9
Turnout		1558	33.6	−0.7
UKIP gain from Labour		Swing	-0.7	

=== Lanehead ward ===
Lanehead
Party	Candidate	Votes	%	±%
Labour	Shbana Khan	870	55.0	+7.2
Liberal Democrats	Pippa Lishman	339	21.4	−18.8
Conservative	Narayana Picton	281	17.8	+17.8
Green	Crissie Fay Amber Harter	91	5.8	−6.2
Majority		531	33.6	+25.9
Turnout		1581	23.9	−13.5
Labour hold		Swing	+13.0	

=== Queensgate ward ===
Queensgate
Party	Candidate	Votes	%	±%
Labour	Sue Graham	693	50.1	−7.3
Liberal Democrats	Naweed Manzur	386	27.9	+3.1
Conservative	Gavin Hartley	221	16.0	+16.0
Green	Nigel Andrew Baldwin	83	6.0	+6.0
Majority		307	22.2	−4.2
Turnout		1383	33.2	−2.7
Labour hold		Swing	-5.2	

=== Rosegrove with Lowerhouse ward ===
Rosegrove with Lowerhouse
Party	Candidate	Votes	%	±%
Labour	Bea Foster	537	46.1	−3.4
BAPIP	Lorraine Bernice Mehanna	297	25.5	+25.5
Conservative	Mathew John Nuttall	176	15.1	+15.1
Green	Barbara Pauline Baldwin	81	7.0	+2.2
UKIP	Ernest Stuart Calderbank	74	6.4	−16.9
Majority		240	20.6	−5.8
Turnout		1165	24.1	−2.3
Labour hold		Swing	-14.5	

=== Rosehill with Burnley Wood ward ===
Rosehill with Burnley Wood
Party	Candidate	Votes	%	±%
Liberal Democrats	Jeff Sumner	699	48.5	+1.3
Labour	Gail Barton	493	34.2	−10.1
Conservative	Phil Chamberlain	188	13.0	+13.0
Green	Georgina Hannah Ormrod	62	4.3	−4.2
Majority		206	14.3	+11.4
Turnout		1442	31.4	+0.5
Liberal Democrats hold		Swing	+5.7	

=== Trinity ward ===
Trinity
Party	Candidate	Votes	%	±%
Green	Andy Fewings	789	65.8	+41.7
Labour	Howard Baker	291	24.3	−25.5
Conservative	Michael Paterson	75	6.3	+6.3
BAPIP	Jan Weaver	45	3.8	+3.8
Majority		498	41.5	+17.7
Turnout		1200	29.7	+5.6
Green gain from Labour		Swing	+33.6	

=== Whittlefield with Ightenhill ward ===
Whittlefield with Ightenhill
Party	Candidate	Votes	%	±%
Conservative	Dale Joseph Ferrier	415	27.4	−5.1
BAPIP	Emma Louise Victoria Payne	356	23.5	+23.5
Labour	Grace Elizabeth Donovan	326	21.6	+1.2
Liberal Democrats	Peter McCann	264	17.5	−15.0
UKIP	Peter Gill	89	5.9	−12.2
Green	Laura Fisk	40	2.6	+0.4
VPP	Ray Hogan	22	1.5	+1.5
Majority		59	3.9	−1.7
Turnout		1512	32.0	−1.5
Conservative gain from Liberal Democrats		Swing	+5.0	
