= 2004 Burnley Borough Council election =

2004 UK local government election

Results of the 2004 Burnley Borough Council election

Elections to Burnley Borough Council in Lancashire, England were held on 10 June 2004. One third of the council was up for election and the Labour Party lost overall control of the council to no overall control.

After the election, the composition of the council was:

- Labour 21
- Liberal Democrat 11
- British National Party 6
- Conservative 4
- Others 3

== Election result ==
Burnley local election result 2004
Party	Seats	Gains	Losses	Net gain/loss	Seats %	Votes %	Votes	+/−
Labour	7	1	3	-2	46.7	33.1	10,472	+3.2
Liberal Democrats	5	2	0	+2	33.3	29.4	9,315	+12.2
Conservative	2	1	0	+1	13.3	20.2	6,404	+10.5
BNP	1	1	1	0	6.7	14.4	4,545	-26.6
Independent	0	0	1	-1	0.0	2.9	931	-9.3

== Ward results ==
Bank Hall
Party	Candidate	Votes	%	±%
Labour	Barry Guttridge	894	50.2	+3.2
Liberal Democrats	Qurban Ali	464	26.0	+26.0
Conservative	Paul Coates	424	23.8	+10.8
Majority		430	24.1	+10.6
Turnout		1,782		
Labour hold		Swing		

Briercliffe
Party	Candidate	Votes	%	±%
Liberal Democrats	Margaret Lishman	1,197	51.9	+8.6
BNP	David Thomson	642	27.8	−16.3
Labour	Laurence Embley	274	11.9	−0.7
Conservative	Joanne Day	194	8.4	+8.4
Majority		555	24.0	
Turnout		2,307		
Liberal Democrats hold		Swing		

Brunshaw
Party	Candidate	Votes	%	±%
Labour	David Halsall	941	44.4	+7.5
BNP	Michael Pound	510	24.0	−13.0
Conservative	Tony Coulson	395	18.6	+5.2
Liberal Democrats	Denise Embra	272	12.8	+12.8
Majority		431	20.3	
Turnout		2,118		
Labour hold		Swing		

Cliviger with Worsthorne
Party	Candidate	Votes	%	±%
Conservative	Michael Tattersall	1,019	37.8	+15.0
BNP	David Shapcott	647	24.0	−8.8
Liberal Democrats	June Evans	485	18.0	
Labour	John Baker	415	15.4	−4.5
Liberal Democrats	Catherine Bennett	128	4.7	
Majority		372	13.8	
Turnout		2,694		
Conservative gain from BNP		Swing		

Coalclough with Deerplay
Party	Candidate	Votes	%	±%
Liberal Democrats	Charles Bullas	984	51.1	−0.5
BNP	Mark Pennington	404	21.0	−13.2
Labour	Alex McLachlan	301	15.6	+1.4
Conservative	Barry Robinson	238	12.3	+12.3
Majority		580	30.1	+12.7
Turnout		1,927		
Liberal Democrats hold		Swing		

Daneshouse with Stoneyholme
Party	Candidate	Votes	%	±%
Liberal Democrats	Mozaquir Ali	1,576	54.3	+0.2
Labour	Nurul Hoque	1,207	41.6	+26.7
Conservative	Luke Townley	121	4.2	+4.2
Majority		369	12.7	−10.4
Turnout		2,904		
Liberal Democrats hold		Swing		

Gannow
Party	Candidate	Votes	%	±%
Labour	Mark Townsend	650	32.5	−1.8
BNP	John Cave	583	29.1	−9.5
Conservative	Jeffrey Pickup	390	19.5	+7.8
Liberal Democrats	Mary McCann	379	18.9	+3.5
Majority		67	3.3	
Turnout		2,002		
Labour hold		Swing		

Gawthorpe
Party	Candidate	Votes	%	±%
Labour	Andy Tatchell	812	45.1	+1.3
Liberal Democrats	Paul Smith	535	29.7	+29.7
Conservative	Laura Dowding	455	25.2	+9.2
Majority		277	15.4	+11.7
Turnout		1,802		
Labour hold		Swing		

Hapton with Park
Party	Candidate	Votes	%	±%
BNP	Sharon Wilkinson	615	29.6	−9.4
Labour	John Harbour	587	28.2	−6.2
Liberal Democrats	Norman Mitchell	583	28.0	+28.0
Conservative	Alan Marsden	294	14.1	+6.3
Majority		28	1.3	−3.2
Turnout		2,079		
BNP gain from Labour		Swing		

Lanehead
Party	Candidate	Votes	%	±%
Liberal Democrats	Ian Stanworth	769	36.4	+17.9
Labour	Julie Cooper	592	28.0	−3.7
Independent	Ann Royle	493	23.3	+7.5
Conservative	Arthur Coates	259	12.2	+12.2
Majority		177	8.4	
Turnout		2,113		
Liberal Democrats gain from Labour		Swing		

Queensgate
Party	Candidate	Votes	%	±%
Liberal Democrats	Bill Bennett	900	45.0	+27.8
Labour	Paul Moore	770	38.5	−2.7
Conservative	Ian Pool	330	16.5	+16.5
Majority		130	6.5	
Turnout		2,000		
Liberal Democrats gain from Labour		Swing		

Rosegrove with Lowerhouse
Party	Candidate	Votes	%	±%
Labour	Lilian Clark	827	43.2	+8.8
BNP	Derek Dawson	701	36.6	+36.6
Conservative	Barry Elliott	387	20.2	+11.9
Majority		126	6.6	
Turnout		1,915		
Labour gain from Independent		Swing		

Rosehill with Burnley Wood
Party	Candidate	Votes	%	±%
Labour	Denis Otter	649	30.7	−5.9
BNP	Gregory Marshall	443	21.0	−13.2
Liberal Democrats	Peter Holden	435	20.1	+4.7
Conservative	David Tierney	332	15.7	+2.0
Independent	James Cowell	252	11.9	+11.9
Majority		206	9.7	+7.3
Turnout		2,111		
Labour hold		Swing		

Trinity
Party	Candidate	Votes	%	±%
Labour	Tony Lambert	984	67.4	+25.8
Conservative	George Middleton	475	32.5	+32.5
Majority		509	34.9	+27.5
Turnout		1,459		
Labour hold		Swing		

Whittlefield with Ightenhill
Party	Candidate	Votes	%	±%
Conservative	Peter Doyle	1,091	47.2	
Liberal Democrats	Christopher Robinson	736	31.8	
Labour	Tony Martin	484	20.9	
Majority		355	15.4	
Turnout		2,311		
Conservative hold		Swing		
