= 2003 Burnley Borough Council election =

2003 UK local government election

2003 local election results in Burnley

Elections to Burnley Borough Council in Lancashire, England were held on 1 May 2003. One third of the council was up for election with a by-election in the Whittlefield with Ightenhill ward. The British National Party won the popular vote and gained the most seats, although the Labour Party retained overall control of the council.

After the election, the composition of the council was:

- Labour 24
- British National Party 8
- Liberal Democrat 7
- Conservative 3
- Others 3

== Election result ==
Burnley local election result 2003
Party	Seats	Gains	Losses	Net gain/loss	Seats %	Votes %	Votes	+/−
BNP	7	6	1	5	43.7	30.5	8,543	+18.7
Labour	5	0	3	-3	31.2	29.9	8,387	-18.8
Liberal Democrats	2	0	1	-1	12.5	17.2	4,824	+0.2
Independent	1	1	1	0	6.3	12.2	3,431	-0.7
Conservative	1	0	1	-1	6.3	9.7	2,730	+1.1
Socialist Alliance	0	0	0	0	0.0	0.5	134	-0.3

== Ward results ==
Bank Hall
Party	Candidate	Votes	%	±%
Labour	Caroline Kavanagh	708	47.0	−21.2
BNP	Mark Halstead	505	33.6	+20.3
Conservative	Paul Coates	196	13.0	+13.0
Socialist Alliance	Avril Hesson	96	6.4	+6.4
Majority		203	13.5	
Turnout		1505		
Labour hold		Swing		

Briercliffe
Party	Candidate	Votes	%	±%
BNP	Patricia Thomson	877	44.1	+44.1
Liberal Democrats	Peter McCann	862	43.3	−25.8
Labour	Angela Healey	250	12.6	−18.3
Majority		15	0.8	
Turnout		1989		
BNP gain from Liberal Democrats		Swing		

Brunshaw
Party	Candidate	Votes	%	±%
BNP	Maureen Stowe	715	37.0	+20.1
Labour	David Halsall	712	36.9	−35.3
Conservative	Anita Walker	259	13.4	+13.4
Independent	Cliff Tahir	245	12.7	+1.8
Majority		3	0.1	
Turnout		1931		
BNP gain from Labour		Swing		

Cliviger with Worsthorne
Party	Candidate	Votes	%	±%
BNP	Brian Turner	795	32.8	+20.0
Conservative	Tony Walker	551	22.8	−13.6
Labour	Philip Walsh	483	19.9	−9.6
Independent	Kevin Robinson	465	19.2	+7.4
Liberal Democrats	Catherine Bennett	128	5.3	+5.3
Majority		244	10.1	
Turnout		2422		
BNP gain from Independent		Swing		

Coalclough with Deerplay
Party	Candidate	Votes	%	±%
Liberal Democrats	Philip Horrocks	803	51.6	−11.8
BNP	Mark Pennington	532	34.2	+22.9
Labour	Antony Martin	222	14.2	−4.0
Majority		271	17.4	
Turnout		1557		
Liberal Democrats hold		Swing		

Daneshouse with Stoneyholme
Party	Candidate	Votes	%	±%
Liberal Democrats	Manzoor Hussain	1,286	54.1	+11.9
Independent	Imtiaz Hussain	736	31.0	+16.4
Labour	Anthony Harrison	353	14.9	−28.3
Majority		550	23.1	
Turnout		2374		
Liberal Democrats hold		Swing		

Gannow
Party	Candidate	Votes	%	±%
BNP	Carol Hughes	687	38.6	+23.6
Labour	Patrick Tierney	611	34.3	−12.2
Liberal Democrats	Mary Jane McCann	274	15.4	+15.4
Conservative	Jeffrey Pickup	209	11.7	+2.0
Majority		76	4.3	
Turnout		1781		
BNP hold		Swing		

Gawthorpe
Party	Candidate	Votes	%	±%
Labour	Linda Gauton	777	43.8	−9.3
BNP	Andrew Kenyon	712	40.2	+25.7
Conservative	Laura Dowding	284	16.0	+8.7
Majority		65	3.7	
Turnout		1773		
Labour hold		Swing		

Hapton with Park
Party	Candidate	Votes	%	±%
BNP	Len Starr	661	39.0	+25.1
Labour	Andrew Tatchell	584	34.4	−28.6
Independent	Patricia Stinton	319	18.8	+7.2
Conservative	Alan Marsden	132	7.8	+7.8
Majority		77	4.5	
Turnout		1696		
BNP gain from Labour		Swing		

Lanehead
Party	Candidate	Votes	%	±%
BNP	Luke Smith	668	34.0	+18.1
Labour	Brian Cooper	623	31.7	−17.6
Liberal Democrats	Martin Smith	365	18.5	+2.4
Independent	Anthony Doyle	311	15.8	−2.9
Majority		45	2.3	
Turnout		1967		
BNP gain from Labour		Swing		

Queensgate
Party	Candidate	Votes	%	±%
Labour	Mohammad Najib	764	41.2	−25.3
BNP	Rauth McGuinness	612	33.0	+17.0
Liberal Democrats	Denise Embra	319	17.2	−0.3
Independent	Ian Nelson	160	8.6	+8.6
Majority		152	8.2	
Turnout		1855		
Labour hold		Swing		

Rosegrove with Lowerhouse
Party	Candidate	Votes	%	±%
Independent	Sam Holgate	618	43.7	+2.0
Labour	Michael Nelson	487	34.4	−9.5
Liberal Democrats	Paul Smith	192	13.6	+13.6
Conservative	Barry Robinson	118	8.3	+8.3
Majority		131	9.3	
Turnout		1415		
Independent gain from BNP		Swing		

Rosehill with Burnley Wood
Party	Candidate	Votes	%	±%
Labour	Janice Swainston	679	36.6	−17.9
BNP	James Cowell	634	34.2	+20.4
Liberal Democrats	Christopher Robinson	285	15.4	+15.4
Conservative	David Tierney	255	13.7	+2.5
Majority		45	2.4	
Turnout		1853		
Labour hold		Swing		

Trinity
Party	Candidate	Votes	%	±%
Labour	Elizabeth Monk	598	41.6	−23.2
BNP	Simon Haworth	491	34.2	+19.5
Liberal Democrats	William Bennett	310	21.6	+7.3
Socialist Alliance	Stephen Worden	38	2.6	−3.6
Majority		107	7.4	
Turnout		1437		
Labour hold		Swing		

Whittlefield with Ightenhill (2)
Party	Candidate	Votes	%	±%
Conservative	Ida Carmichael	726	21.8	
BNP	Barry Birks	654	19.7	
Independent	Jean Steward	577	17.3	
Labour	Ian Townsend	536	16.1	
Conservative	Alan Stewart	436	18.1	
Labour	Hilary Ward	398	12.0	
Majority				
Turnout		3327		
Conservative hold		Swing		
BNP gain from Conservative		Swing		
