= 2006 Burnley Borough Council election =

2006 UK local government election

Results of the 2006 Burnley Borough Council election

Elections to Burnley Borough Council in Lancashire, England were held on 4 May 2006. One third of the council was up for election, with by-elections in the Bank Hall and Brunshaw wards. The by-elections followed the resignations of (Bank Hall) Labour councillor Caroline Kavanagh and (Brunshaw) BNP-turned-independent-with-links-to-Labour councillor Maureen Stowe (both last elected in 2003). No party won overall control of the council.

Long-serving Council and Labour group leader Stuart Caddy and his deputy Peter Kenyon both lost their seats, with Andy Tatchell becoming group leader. Liberal Democrat leader Gordon Birtwistle emerged as the council leader after a coalition formed between the Liberal Democrats and Conservatives.

After the election, the composition of the council was

- Liberal Democrat 16
- Labour 16
- British National Party 7
- Conservative 5
- Others 1

== Election result ==
Burnley local election result 2006
Party	Seats	Gains	Losses	Net gain/loss	Seats %	Votes %	Votes	+/−
Liberal Democrats	8	6	1	5	47.0	36.9	10,238	+7.5
Labour	5	0	5	-5	29.4	31.3	8,689	-1.8
Conservative	2	1	0	1	11.8	16.8	4,664	-3.4
BNP	2	2	1	1	11.8	13.3	3,693	-0.9
Independent	0	0	2	-2	0	1.7	471	-1.2

== Ward results ==
Bank Hall (2)
Party	Candidate	Votes	%	±%
Labour	Gary Frayling	718	27.1	
Liberal Democrats	Justin Birtwistle	607	22.9	
Labour	Imtiaz Hussain	599	22.6	
Liberal Democrats	Allen Harris	524	19.8	
Conservative	Paul Coates	204	7.7	
Majority		111	4.1	
Turnout		2652	37.3	
Labour hold		Swing		
Liberal Democrats gain from Labour		Swing		

Briercliffe
Party	Candidate	Votes	%	±%
Liberal Democrats	Roger Frost	1,058	68.4	+16.5
Conservative	Cosima Towneley	302	19.5	+11.1
Labour	Maureen Martin	186	12.0	+0.1
Majority		756	48.9	+24.9
Turnout		1546	34	
Liberal Democrats hold		Swing		

Brunshaw (2)
Party	Candidate	Votes	%	±%
Labour	Donald Hall	703	21.6	
Liberal Democrats	John Jones	635	19.5	
BNP	Anthony Locke	606	18.6	
Labour	Mike Nelson	526	16.1	
Liberal Democrats	James McNulty	453	13.9	
Conservative	Tony Coulson	335	10.3	
Majority		68	2.1	
Turnout		3258	39	
Labour hold		Swing		
Liberal Democrats gain from Independent		Swing		

Cliviger with Worsthorne
Party	Candidate	Votes	%	±%
Conservative	David Heginbotham	1,128	57.6	+19.8
Liberal Democrats	Derek James	500	25.6	+2.9
Labour	Brenda Lambert	328	16.8	+1.4
Majority		628	32.1	+18.3
Turnout		1956	45.5	
Conservative hold		Swing		

Coalclough with Deerplay
Party	Candidate	Votes	%	±%
Liberal Democrats	Gordon Birtwistle	1,254	83.0	+31.9
Labour Co-op	Marcus Johnstone	256	17.0	+1.4
Majority		1018	67.4	+37.3
Turnout		1510	37.7	
Liberal Democrats hold		Swing		

Daneshouse with Stoneyholme
Party	Candidate	Votes	%	±%
Labour	Zaheer Ahmed	1,079	50.3	+8.7
Liberal Democrats	Tahir Narwaz	1065	49.7	−4.6
Majority		14	0.7	
Turnout		2144	54.8	
Labour hold		Swing		

Gannow
Party	Candidate	Votes	%	±%
BNP	Derek Dawson	559	31.7	+2.6
Liberal Democrats	Mary McCann	469	26.6	+7.7
Labour	Alexander McLachlan	483	27.4	−5.1
Conservative	Arthur Coats	252	14.3	−5.2
Majority		76	4.3	
Turnout		1763	40.2	
BNP gain from Labour		Swing		

Gawthorpe
Party	Candidate	Votes	%	±%
Labour	Frank Cant	507	33.1	−12.0
BNP	Scott Atkinson	480	31.4	+31.4
Conservative	James Shoesmith	279	18.2	−7.0
Liberal Democrats	Denise Embra	265	17.3	+17.3
Majority		27	1.8	−13.6
Turnout		1531	33.8	
Labour hold		Swing		

Hapton with Park
Party	Candidate	Votes	%	±%
BNP	David Thomson	622	34.4	+4.8
Labour	John Harbour	579	32.0	+3.8
Liberal Democrats	Christine Puckett-Gouldin	324	17.9	−10.1
Conservative	Alan Marsden	283	15.7	+1.6
Majority		43	2.4	+1.1
Turnout		1808	39.5	
BNP gain from Liberal Democrats		Swing		

Lanehead
Party	Candidate	Votes	%	±%
Liberal Democrats	Peter McCann	741	41.8	+5.4
Independent	Paula Riley	471	26.6	+3.3
Labour	Laurence Embley	370	20.9	−7.1
Conservative	Joanne Day	191	10.8	−1.4
Majority		270	15.2	+6.8
Turnout		1733	40.3	
Liberal Democrats gain from Independent		Swing		

Queensgate
Party	Candidate	Votes	%	±%
Liberal Democrats	Darren Reynolds	899	53.0	+8.0
Labour	Peter Kenyon	583	34.4	−4.1
Conservative	Barry Robinson	214	12.6	−3.9
Majority		316	18.6	+12.1
Turnout		1696	39.8	
Liberal Democrats gain from Labour		Swing		

Rosegrove with Lowerhouse
Party	Candidate	Votes	%	±%
Liberal Democrats	Bernard Hill	609	33.2	+33.2
BNP	Elaine Kirkby	555	30.3	−6.3
Labour	Stuart Caddy	549	29.9	−13.3
Conservative	Ian Pool	121	6.6	−13.6
Majority		54	2.9	
Turnout		1834	40.5	
Liberal Democrats gain from Labour		Swing		

Rosehill with Burnley Wood
Party	Candidate	Votes	%	±%
Liberal Democrats	Jeff Sumner	812	50.2	+30.1
Labour	Colette Bailey	466	28.8	−1.9
Conservative	David Tierney	339	21.0	+5.3
Majority		346	21.4	
Turnout		1617	36.7	
Liberal Democrats gain from Labour		Swing		

Trinity
Party	Candidate	Votes	%	±%
Labour	John Baker	428	34.0	−33.4
BNP	John Cave	410	32.5	+32.5
Liberal Democrats	Michael Baker	266	21.1	+21.1
Conservative	George Middleton	156	12.4	−20.1
Majority		18	1.4	−33.5
Turnout		1260	32.1	
Labour hold		Swing		

Whittlefield with Ightenhill
Party	Candidate	Votes	%	±%
Conservative	Jonathan Gilbert	860	43.1	−4.1
BNP	David Shapcott	461	23.1	+23.1
Liberal Democrats	Carol Holden	347	17.4	−14.4
Labour	Angela Donovan	329	16.5	−4.4
Majority		399	20.0	+4.6
Turnout		1997	42	
Conservative gain from BNP		Swing		
