= 2010 Burnley Borough Council election =

2010 UK local government election

2010 local election results in Burnley

Elections to Burnley Borough Council in Lancashire, England were held on 6 May 2010. One-third of the council was up for election plus a by-election in the Queensgate ward following the death of Liberal Democrat councillor Bill Bennett (last elected in 2008). The Liberal Democrat party retained overall control of the council.

As the Liberal Democrat group and council leader Gordon Birtwistle was elected as constituency MP, following the election he was replaced in both these roles by Charlie Briggs. Also, a police investigation was launched into voting irregularities in the Daneshouse with Stoneyholme ward.

After the election, the composition of the council was:

- Liberal Democrat 24
- Labour 14
- Conservative 5
- British National Party 2

== Election result ==
Burnley local election result 2010
Party	Seats	Gains	Losses	Net gain/loss	Seats %	Votes %	Votes	+/−
Liberal Democrats	9	2	1	+1	56.3	39.9	17059	+2.6
Labour	6	2	0	+2	37.5	29.2	12493	+1.4
Conservative	1	0	1	-1	6.3	20.2	8626	+1.3
BNP	0	0	2	-2	0.0	10.8	4619	-4.1

== Ward results ==
Bank Hall
Party	Candidate	Votes	%	±%
Labour	Gary Frayling	1,085	45.7	+2.2
Liberal Democrats	Manzur Naweed	858	36.2	−3.8
Conservative	Mathew Isherwood	430	18.1	−1.5
Majority		227	13.8	+10.3
Turnout		2373	54.6	
Labour hold		Swing		

Briercliffe
Party	Candidate	Votes	%	±%
Liberal Democrats	Roger Barstow Frost	1,869	58.9	+3.4
Conservative	Susan Nutter	696	21.9	+8.6
Labour	John Kenyon	608	19.2	+7.9
Majority		1173	37.0	+1.4
Turnout		3173	69.5	
Liberal Democrats hold		Swing		

Brunshaw
Party	Candidate	Votes	%	±%
Labour	Tony Harrison	959	32.7	+6.2
Liberal Democrats	Allen Harris	946	32.2	−4.7
BNP	Carme McDevitt	538	18.3	−4.3
Conservative	Brent Whittham	492	16.8	+3.1
Majority		13	0.4	
Turnout		2935	59.3	
Labour gain from Liberal Democrats		Swing		

Cliviger with Worsthorne
Party	Candidate	Votes	%	±%
Conservative	David Heginbotham	1,577	48.3	+2.7
Liberal Democrats	Margret Brindle	1101	33.7	+9.7
Labour	Samuel McLachlen	586	18.0	+7.4
Majority		476	14.6	−7.0
Turnout		3264	75.3	
Conservative hold		Swing		

Coal Clough with Deerplay
Party	Candidate	Votes	%	±%
Liberal Democrats	Gordon Birtwistle	1,474	55.8	−10.8
Labour	Alexander McLachlan	519	19.7	+4.4
Conservative	Paul Coats	371	14.0	+14.0
BNP	Christopher Vanns	278	10.5	−8.6
Majority		679	36.1	−11.4
Turnout		2642	64.4	
Liberal Democrats hold		Swing		

Daneshouse with Stoneyholme
Party	Candidate	Votes	%	±%
Labour	Shah Hussain	1,554	57.0	+9.4
Liberal Democrats	Tahir Narwaz	1071	39.3	−13.1
Conservative	Philip Nutter	101	3.7	+3.7
Majority		473	17.7	
Turnout		2726	69.9	
Labour hold		Swing		

Gannow
Party	Candidate	Votes	%	±%
Liberal Democrats	Neil Mottershead	891	33.4	−0.3
Labour	Stephen Large	783	29.3	+5.4
BNP	Derek Dawson	546	20.4	−8.9
Conservative	Barry Robinson	450	16.9	+3.8
Majority		108	4.0	−0.4
Turnout		2670	60.8	
Liberal Democrats gain from BNP		Swing		

Gawthorpe
Party	Candidate	Votes	%	±%
Labour	Frank Cant	1,056	38.2	−11.8
BNP	Paul McDevitt	573	20.8	+0.9
Conservative	Philip Clarke	567	20.5	+1.0
Liberal Democrats	Paula Riley	566	20.5	+9.9
Majority		483	17.5	−12.6
Turnout		2762	54.8	
Labour hold		Swing		

Hapton with Park
Party	Candidate	Votes	%	±%
Labour	Jean Cunningham	856	29.2	−4.4
Liberal Democrats	Sandra Byrne	793	27.1	+17.8
BNP	John Cave	708	24.1	−14.5
Conservative	Michelle Lord	574	19.6	+1.1
Majority		63	2.1	
Turnout		2931	62.3	
Labour gain from BNP		Swing		

Lanehead
Party	Candidate	Votes	%	±%
Liberal Democrats	Peter McCann	1,352	46.7	−9.4
Labour	Ann Royle	975	33.7	+10.2
Conservative	Alexander Harrison	567	19.6	−0.8
Majority		377	13.0	−19.6
Turnout		2894	64.5	
Liberal Democrats hold		Swing		

Queensgate (2)
Party	Candidate	Votes	%	±%
Liberal Democrats	Jennifer Knowles	1,176	26.1	
Liberal Democrats	Darren Reynolds	1,039	23.1	
Labour	Marcus Johnstone	787	17.5	
Labour	Marion Smith	629	14.0	
BNP	John Rowe	444	9.8	
Conservative	Arthur Coats	430	9.5	
Majority		137		
Turnout		4,505	37.1	
Liberal Democrats hold		Swing		
Liberal Democrats hold		Swing		

Rosegrove with Lowerhouse
Party	Candidate	Votes	%	±%
Liberal Democrats	Julie Johnson	926	33.4	−6.8
Labour	Joanne Greenwood	869	31.3	+12.8
BNP	Paul Robinson	509	18.4	−12.5
Conservative	John Elliott	469	16.9	+6.6
Majority		57	2.1	−7.1
Turnout		2733	33.6	
Liberal Democrats hold		Swing		

Rosehill with Burnley Wood
Party	Candidate	Votes	%	±%
Liberal Democrats	Jeff Sumner	1,173	43.0	−9.6
Labour	Paul Campbell	755	27.7	+2.7
Conservative	David Tierney	460	16.9	−5.5
BNP	Kyle Winder	338	12.4	+12.4
Majority		418	15.3	−16.1
Turnout		2726	60.9	
Liberal Democrats hold		Swing		

Trinity
Party	Candidate	Votes	%	±%
Labour	Howard Baker	672	34.4	−6.0
Liberal Democrats	Martyn Hurt	671	34.4	+13.6
Conservative	Jack Picton	307	15.7	+3.1
BNP	David Shapcott	301	15.5	−8.7
Majority		1	0.0	−18.2
Turnout		1951	51.3	
Labour hold		Swing		

Whittlefield with Ightenhill
Party	Candidate	Votes	%	±%
Liberal Democrats	Tom Porter	1,153	34.0	+18.5
Conservative	Barrie Bamford	1135	33.5	−20.8
Labour	Tyrell McGowan	716	21.1	+7.1
BNP	Joan Shapcott	384	11.4	−4.9
Majority		18	0.01	
Turnout		3388	70.1	
Liberal Democrats gain from Conservative		Swing		
