= 2012 Burnley Borough Council election =

2012 UK local government election

2012 local election results in Burnley

Elections to Burnley Borough Council in Lancashire, England were held on 3 May 2012. One third of the council was up for election and the Labour Party regained control of the council, with Julie Cooper becoming council leader. Also the last remaining British National Party councillor, Sharon Wilkinson, lost the Hapton with Park seat, a decade since the far-right group were first elected to the council

After the election, the composition of the council was:

- Labour 26
- Liberal Democrat 14
- Conservative 5
- British National Party 0

== Election result ==
Burnley election result 2012
Party	Seats	Gains	Losses	Net gain/loss	Seats %	Votes %	Votes	+/−
Labour	11	8	0	+8	73.33	52.7	11,362	+6.0
Liberal Democrats	2	0	7	-7	13.33	33.5	7,224	+0.9
Conservative	2	0	0	0	13.33	5.6	1,209	-8.6
BNP	0	0	1	-1	0.00	5.3	1,151	-0.6
UKIP	0	0	0	0	0.00	2.9	633	+2.9

== Ward results ==
Bank Hall
Party	Candidate	Votes	%	±%
Labour	Julie Cooper	1,011	80.4	+2.9
Liberal Democrats	Trevor Kirkham	246	19.6	−2.9
Majority		765	60.9	+5.9
Turnout		1257	29.1	
Labour hold		Swing		

Briercliffe
Party	Candidate	Votes	%	±%
Liberal Democrats	Margaret Lishman	768	57.2	+2.2
Labour	Brian Cooper	424	31.6	+3.5
Conservative	Susan Nutter	151	11.2	−5.7
Majority		344	25.6	−1.2
Turnout		1343	29.4	
Liberal Democrats hold		Swing		

Brunshaw
Party	Candidate	Votes	%	±%
Labour	Lian Pate	863	66.4	+4.5
Liberal Democrats	Linda White	436	33.6	+12.3
Majority		427	32.9	−7.6
Turnout		1299	26.6	
Labour gain from Liberal Democrats		Swing		

Cliviger with Worsthorne
Party	Candidate	Votes	%	±%
Conservative	Andrew Newhouse	456	29.2	−17.7
Liberal Democrats	Paula Riley	441	28.3	+1.4
Labour	Brian Tomlinson	365	23.4	−2.8
UKIP	Tom Commis	298	19.1	+19.1
Majority		15	1.0	−19.0
Turnout		1560	36.3	
Conservative hold		Swing		

Coalclough with Deerplay
Party	Candidate	Votes	%	±%
Liberal Democrats	Charles Bullas	718	60.7	+13.4
Labour	Samuel McLachlan	464	39.3	+8.7
Majority		254	21.5	+4.9
Turnout		1182	29.5	
Liberal Democrats hold		Swing		

Daneshouse with Stoneyholme
Party	Candidate	Votes	%	±%
Labour	Saeed Akhtar Chaudhary	1,571	66.1	−9.6
Liberal Democrats	Mohammed Abdul Malik	805	33.9	+9.6
Majority		766	32.2	−19.2
Turnout		2376	61.5	
Labour gain from Liberal Democrats		Swing		

Gannow
Party	Candidate	Votes	%	±%
Labour	Betsy Stringer	710	53.7	+18.3
Liberal Democrats	Justin Birtwistle	474	35.9	−5.6
BNP	Derek Dawson	137	10.4	−1.5
Majority		236	17.9	
Turnout		1321	30.3	
Labour gain from Liberal Democrats		Swing		

Gawthorpe
Party	Candidate	Votes	%	±%
Labour	Andy Tatchell	930	73.0	+13.2
Liberal Democrats	David Carter	152	11.9	−9.3
BNP	John Cave	192	15.1	−3.9
Majority		738	57.9	+19.3
Turnout		1274	26.9	
Labour hold		Swing		

Hapton with Park
Party	Candidate	Votes	%	±%
Labour	Jonathan Barker	724	52.1	−7.1
BNP	Sharon Wilkinson	423	30.4	+9.6
Liberal Democrats	Stuart Leyland	243	17.5	+5.5
Majority		301	21.7	−6.7
Turnout		1390	30.1	
Labour gain from BNP		Swing		

Lanehead
Party	Candidate	Votes	%	±%
Labour	Stephen Large	831	51.9	+8.7
Liberal Democrats	Bill Brindle	463	28.9	−7.8
UKIP	Michael Gerard McHugh	184	11.5	+11.5
Conservative	Philip Nutter	124	7.7	−4.6
Majority		368	23.0	+16.4
Turnout		1602	36.0	
Labour gain from Liberal Democrats		Swing		

Queensgate
Party	Candidate	Votes	%	±%
Labour	Arif Khan	996	59.3	+9.9
Liberal Democrats	Martyn Hurt	685	40.7	−9.9
Majority		311	18.5	
Turnout		1681	39.2	
Labour gain from Liberal Democrats		Swing		

Rosegrove with Lowerhouse
Party	Candidate	Votes	%	±%
Labour	Marcus Johnstone	719	53.9	+12.1
Liberal Democrats	Lynne Briggs	464	34.8	+2.8
BNP	Paul McDevitt	150	11.3	−4.2
Majority		255	19.1	+9.2
Turnout		1333	27.6	
Labour gain from Liberal Democrats		Swing		

Rosehill with Burnley Wood
Party	Candidate	Votes	%	±%
Labour	Paul Campbell	725	49.6	+8.7
Liberal Democrats	Karen Patricia Heseltine	586	40.1	−8.3
UKIP	Craig James Ramplee	151	10.3	+10.3
Majority		139	9.5	
Turnout		1462	32.5	
Labour gain from Liberal Democrats		Swing		

Trinity
Party	Candidate	Votes	%	±%
Labour	Tony Lambert	558	58.0	+1.4
Liberal Democrats	Stephanie Forrest	302	31.4	+10.7
BNP	John Rowe	102	10.6	−0.3
Majority		256	26.6	−9.1
Turnout		962	23.8	
Labour hold		Swing		

Whittlefield with Ightenhill
Party	Candidate	Votes	%	±%
Conservative	Mathew Isherwood	478	31.1	−11.3
Labour	Janice Swainston	471	30.6	+1.3
Liberal Democrats	Kathryn Haworth	441	28.7	+0.4
BNP	Christopher Vanns	147	9.6	+9.6
Majority		7	0.5	−12.6
Turnout		1537	31.9	
Conservative hold		Swing		
