= Miranda Robertson =

Scientific editor (born 1945)

- Born: Miranda Barnett; 1945 (age 80–81); London
- Occupation: Scientific Editor
- Known for: Biology Editor of the journal Nature; editor for the textbook Molecular Biology of the Cell

Miranda Robertson is a scientific editor noted for her role as Biology Editor at Nature from 1983 to 1992, during which time Nature's visibility and influence in the life sciences substantially increased, and for her contributions to the textbook Molecular Biology of the Cell. As editor of BMC's open-access Journal of Biology, she introduced improvements in peer review, enabling authors to opt out of re-review.

== Early life and family ==
Robertson was the daughter of S. Anthony (Tony) Barnett, a zoologist specializing in rat behavior at the Australian National University, author, and broadcaster. Her mother was Marjorie Phillips. Her uncle James Barnett was a yeast biologist.

== Career ==
Robertson joined Nature in 1970 during John Maddox's first term as Editor. As a member of the Biology Team and subsequently Biology Editor, she frequently wrote articles for Nature's News and Views series about recent developments in areas including immunology, development, the molecular mechanisms of disease, and early efforts in artificial intelligence, in vitro fertilisation and gene therapy. In 1973, when Maddox was replaced by David Davies, Nature instituted systematic peer review of submitted manuscripts. Under Davies, and subsequently in Maddox's second term, the selectivity of publication decisions dramatically increased. Theoretical biologist Robert May described Robertson as "exceptionally good and well informed" in explaining his willingness to write an unusually large number of News and Views pieces for Nature. She knew Francis Crick both professionally and through family connections, and wrote about his life and work after his death in 2004.

In 1976, while still at Nature, Robertson began to work with a team of scientists led by Bruce Alberts and James Watson on a new textbook, Molecular Biology of the Cell, which was published by Garland Science in 1983. As the developmental editor, she organized a large and diverse network of undergraduates and teachers to provide feedback on chapter drafts. Reviewers praised the "unobtrusively lucid style" of the book Robertson had edited, which was called "the most influential cell biology textbook of its time".

In 1992 Robertson left Nature and joined Garland Science, where she was involved with new biology textbooks. She worked on the development of Immunobiology by Charles Janeway and Paul Travers, and edited two editions of Introduction to Protein Structure by Carl Branden and John Tooze. In 1996 Garland Science was acquired by Taylor & Francis.

In 1998 Robertson joined New Science Press as managing director, where she initiated a series of modular Primers in Biology intended to make teaching easier. The series included "Protein Structure and Function" by Gregory Petsko and Dagmar Ringe and "The Cell Cycle: Principles of Control" by David Morgan. She also co-authored Immunity: The Immune Response to Infectious and Inflammatory Disease with Anthony DeFranco and Richard Locksley.

In 2008, Robertson moved to New Science Press's sister company, BioMedCentral, the first fully open-access publisher. As editor of Journal of Biology, which later merged with BMC Biology, Robertson in 2009 introduced a number of editorial innovations, including allowing authors to opt out of re-review after responding to reviewers' comments, arguing that "pit-bull reviewing" did not serve the community well. This policy was a response to a situation of a highly delayed second review, reported to Robertson by Peter Walter. Robertson commented that it is "the job of journal editors to promote the dissemination of research results rather than to obstruct it, [and] it is the author who is in the end accountable for the quality and validity of the paper that is published." Robertson also introduced a checklist for documenting that submitted papers meet reporting standards for reproducibility and the ability for researchers to pre-register their planned course of research. Robertson's editorials often focused on open questions and unacknowledged "dirty secrets", using Sydney Brenner's term "Ockham's Broom" to refer to the practice of sweeping inconvenient facts under the rug.

In 2017, Robertson announced her retirement from BMC Biology and was succeeded as editor by Mirna Kvajo.
