= Dennis Bray =

British biologist (born 1939)

- Born: 28 June 1939 (age 87)
- Awards: Microsoft European Science Award (2007)
- Scientific career
- Fields: computational biology, microbiology, neurobiology
- Workplaces: University of Cambridge

Dennis Bray (born 1939) is an active emeritus professor at University of Cambridge. His group is also part of the Oxford Centre for Integrative Systems Biology. After a first career in Neurobiology, working on cell growth and movement, Dennis Bray moved in Cambridge to develop computational models of cell signaling, in particular in relation to bacterial chemotaxis.

On 3 November 2006 he was awarded the Microsoft European Science Award for his work on chemotaxis of E. coli.

== Mention in Popular Science ==
Professor Franklin M. Harold writes "The theme [of a protein's shape and functionality being altered by interaction with its environment] comes with numerous variations, some of which are discussed in a thought-provoking article by Dennis Bray [author references Dr. Bray's 1995 article] that examines proteins as information-processing devices."

== Books ==
- Wetware: A Computer in Every Living Cell (2009) ISBN 0-300-14173-4, ISBN 978-0-300-14173-3
- Essential Cell Biology (2003) (with Bruce Alberts, Karen Hopkin, Alexander Johnson, Julian Lewis, Martin Raff, Keith Roberts, Peter Walter) ISBN 0-8153-3480-X, ISBN 978-0-8153-3480-4
- Cell Movements: From Molecules to Motility (2000) ISBN 0-8153-3282-3, ISBN 978-0-8153-3282-4
- Essential Cell Biology: An Introduction to the Molecular Biology of the Cell (1997) (with Bruce Alberts, Alexander Johnson, Julian Lewis, Martin Raff, Keith Roberts, Peter Walter) ISBN 0-8153-2971-7, ISBN 978-0-8153-2971-8
- Molecular Biology of the Cell (3rd ed, 1994) (with Bruce Alberts, Julian Lewis, Martin Raff, Keith Roberts, James D. Watson) ISBN 0-8153-1927-4, ISBN 978-0-8153-1927-6
- Cell Movements (1992) ISBN 0-8153-0717-9, ISBN 978-0-8153-0717-4
- Molecular Biology of the Cell (2nd ed, 1989) (with Bruce Alberts, Keith Roberts, Julian Lewis, Martin Raff) ISBN 0-8240-3695-6, ISBN 978-0-8240-3695-9
- Molecular Biology of the Cell (1st ed, 1982) (with Bruce Alberts, Keith Roberts, Julian Lewis, Martin Raff, James D Watson) ISBN 0-8240-7283-9, ISBN 978-0-8240-7283-4

== Main scientific publications ==
- Bray D (1970) "Surface movements during growth of single explanted neurons". Proc Natl Acad Sci USA,
- Bray D (1973) "Model for Membrane Movements in the Neural Growth Cone". Nature, 244: 93 - 96
- Bray D & White J G (1988) "Cortical flow in animal cells". Science, 239: 883-888
- Bray D (1990) "Intracellular signalling as a parallel distributed process". Journal of Theoretical Biology, 143: 215-231
- Bray D (1995) "Protein molecules as computational elements in living cells". Nature, 376: 307-312
- Bray D, Levin M D & Morton-Firth C J (1998) "Receptor clustering as a cellular mechanism to control sensitivity". Nature, 393: 85-88
