= Julian Hart =

Julian Hart may refer to:

- Julian Deryl Hart (1894–1980), president of Duke University, North Carolina
- Julian Tudor Hart (1927–2018), British doctor

== See also ==
- Hart (disambiguation)
- Julia Hart (disambiguation)
- Julian Hartt (1911–2010), American Methodist theologian
- Julian (disambiguation)
- Julian Hart Lewis (1946–2022), English developmental biologist
- Julian Hart Robertson (1932–2022), American hedge fund manager
