= Julie Hart =

Julie Hart may refer to:

- Julie Hart Beers (1835–1913), née Hart, American landscape painter
- Julie Hart, first wife of wrestler Bret Hart
- Julie Hart, British Labour politician who participated in the 2019 Eastbourne Borough Council election
- Julie Hart, British Green politician who participated in the 2023 Burnley Borough Council election
- Julie Hart, British Conservative politician who participated in the 2023 Redcar and Cleveland Borough Council election

== See also ==
- Julia Hart (disambiguation)
