= Rebecca Heald =

American cell and developmental biologist

Professor Rebecca Heald
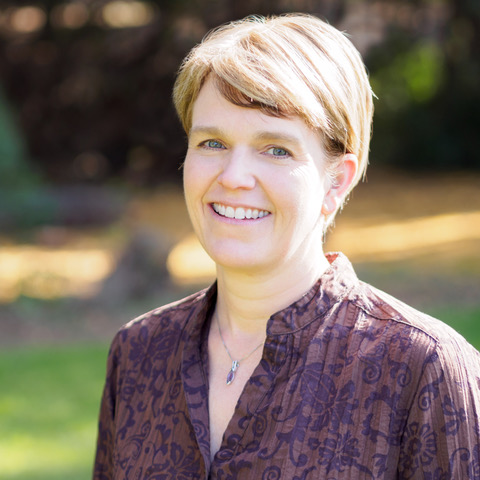
- Dr. Rebecca Heald in 2015
- Education: Hamilton College
- Scientific career
- Fields: Cell and developmental biology
- Workplaces: University of California, Berkeley
- Doctoral advisor: Frank McKeon
- Other academic advisors: Eric Karsenti
- Website: http://mcb.berkeley.edu/labs/heald/

Rebecca W. Heald is an American professor of cell and developmental biology. She is currently a Professor in the Department of Molecular & Cell Biology at the University of California, Berkeley. In May 2019, she was elected to the National Academy of Sciences. She has published over 120 research articles in peer reviewed journals.

== Education and academic appointments ==
Heald grew up in Greenville, Pennsylvania, and graduated from Hamilton College in upstate New York. She said she was inspired by "Biochemistry Professor, Donna Brown. I barely had a clue about what I was doing, but discovered the joy of pipeting colorless liquids from tube to tube." She received her Ph.D. from Harvard Medical School, where she worked in the laboratory of Frank McKeon. She was a postdoctoral researcher with Eric Karsenti at the European Molecular Biology Laboratory in Heidelberg, Germany. She joined the faculty at the University of California, Berkeley in 1997, and has held the Flora Lamson Hewlett Chair of Biochemistry since 2011. In addition to running her research group, from 2018-2021 she served as a regional associate dean for research administration and from 2021-2025 as co-chair of the department of Molecular and Cell Biology.

== Research ==
Heald studies topics in cell biology and developmental biology, including size control in animals, and the regulation of cell division. She uses egg cytoplasmic extracts from the frog Xenopus laevis and the related, smaller frog Xenopus tropicalis to study the behavior and size scaling of the mitotic spindle. She has shown that the volume of the cytoplasm in which a spindle forms is a key factor in regulating the size of the spindle, addressing an important problem in cell biology, that of how cells sense and control the size of their organelles. She identified a biochemical modification of the nuclear transport receptor importin α as a sensor that scales intracellular structures to cell size.

=== Advocacy for collaborative structures in science ===
Heald has written about the challenges of starting a lab as a new Assistant Professor, and the benefits of collaborating with her neighbors Matt Welch and Karsten Weis to create a nurturing scientific and educational environment.

== Awards and honors ==
• 1999: Pew Scholars Award in the Biomedical Sciences.

• 2005: American Society for Cell Biology Women in Cell Biology Junior Award.

• 2006: National Institutes of Health Director's Pioneer Award.

• 2010 and 2016: UC Berkeley Outstanding Postdoc Mentoring Award.

• 2017: Fellow, American Society for Cell Biology.

• 2018-19: Leon Henkin Citation for distinguished service enhancing equity, inclusion and diversity.

• 2019: Member, National Academy of Sciences.

• 2021: American Society for Cell Biology Keith R. Porter Lecture

• 2022: Member, American Academy of Arts and Sciences

• 2022: American Society for Cell Biology Sandra K. Masur Senior Leadership Award

• 2023: Member, American Association for the Advancement of Science

== Academic service ==
Heald has served on the editorial boards of the Journal of Cell Biology and Developmental Cell. She is currently an editor for the Proceedings of the National Academy of Sciences and a co-author of textbooks Molecular Biology of the Cell and Essential Cell Biology.
