= S. Narasinga Rao =

American academic (born 1938)

S. Narasinga Rao (born 1938 in Krishnagiri, Tamil Nadu, India) is an American academic and former dean of Jackson College of Graduate Studies and Research at the University of Central Oklahoma (1996–2006).

== Education ==
Rao completed his higher secondary education in 1954 from Board High School, Krishnagiri. He did his Intermediate at St. Joseph's College in Bangalore. He obtained a Bachelor of Science Degree with physics as major from Madras Christian College attached to the University of Madras in 1958. In 1962, he received a distinction in his Master of Science degree in physics through Madras Christian College from the same university. He then moved to McMaster University in Canada where he received a second Master of Science degree in 1969 followed by a PhD in biophysics in 1973 from the State University of New York at Buffalo, NY, through the Center for Crystallographic Research at Roswell Park Comprehensive Cancer Center (formerly known as Roswell Park Memorial Institute). Rao had the distinction of studying under R.Parthasarathy, Gopinath Kartha and David Harker along with Nobel Laureates, Dr. Herbert Hauptman and Sir John Eccles.

While he was a graduate student under Dr. Parthasarathy at Roswell Park, Rao determined the crystal and molecular structures of several nitrates of amino acids and peptides using X-Ray diffraction techniques. He published the results in Acta Crystallographica. As a post-doctoral fellow at Oklahoma Medical Research Foundation, he isolated, purified, characterized, and crystallized Human Plasma Albumin and published several papers in Bio Physica and Bio Chimica Acta and Journal of Biological Chemistry. He also crystallized Porcine Pepsinogen and published a paper on crystallization.

== Career ==
From 1969 to 1973, Rao worked as a junior research scientist at the Center for Crystallographic Research at Roswell Park, then as a senior research scientist at the Oklahoma Medical Research Foundation from 1973 to 1983, before joining the University of Central Oklahoma as an assistant professor in 1983.

He was assistant dean of the Graduate College and dean of research at the University of Central Oklahoma before taking up the same position at Dr. Joe C. Jackson College of Graduate Studies and Research from 1996 to 2006. Rao chaired the Regents Council on Research for regional universities from 1995 to 2006 and was a member of the governing board of the American Institute of Physics from 1996 to 2005 as well as treasurer, Chief Financial Officer and Chair of the Annual Meeting Organization Committee and the Financial Committee of the American Crystallographic Association from 1990 to date. He was appointed ACA representative for the Science Policy Advisory Committee to foreign embassies at the State Department in Washington DC. He has also been a member of the state arts councils of Oklahoma and the Edmond Humanities and Arts council. He was the principal investigator for Ron McNair, Title III, Student Support Services, Oklahoma Louis Alliance for Minority Participation in Science, Mathematics, Engineering and Technology. Oklahoma Center for the Advancement of Science and Technology internships, NSF STEP and NSF CSEMS grants..

Rao has authored and co-authored several papers published in Acta Crystallographica, Biophysica Biochemica Acta, Journal of Biology and other scientific journals. He is a co-author in a book – Laboratory Physics- published by Prentice Hall. His research interest is the three-dimensional crystal and molecular structure of small and large biological molecules and its relation to the biological activity. He has also published articles on "Physics of the temple" and other articles in religious magazines as Suguna Digest and published a monograph on "Is God Perfect and if so, why this imperfect world?" along with Sri Vishwa Vijata Theertha Swamiji, the ex-junior Swamiji of Pejawar Mutt, Udupi.

Rao initiated programs on Sanskrit, Hindu philosophy and Hindu humanities at the University of Central Oklahoma. He started the Oklahoma Research Day in 1999 by bringing together all regional universities and colleges in the state of Oklahoma and organized the research day for 10 years at the University of Central Oklahoma.

He was founding president of the East West Art Forum and the India Association of Oklahoma, and an executive committee member of the India Cultural Foundation in Oklahoma city as well as member of the Inter-Faith Alliance of Oklahoma.

After retirement in 2008, he and his family moved to Phoenix, Arizona. Rao continued his efforts at globalisation. which he initiated as the graduate dean at UCO, by working with University of Central Oklahoma, Northeastern Oklahoma State University and University of Wisconsin at River Falls in USA with SRM University in Chennai and St. Joseph's College, Seshadripuram Academy for Global Excellence (SAGE), and Jain University in Bangalore. As a dean, he had brought 17 students from St. Joseph's College of Business Administration in Bangalore for summer research internships at UCO. He continues to collaborate with SAGE and Mount Carmel College to bring the students from India for higher studies to University of Central Oklahoma, and South Western Oklahoma State University for MBA.

Rao is now bestowed an honor by his being elected as a FELLOW of American Crystallographic Association. He has been invited to write “Living History”, for American Crystallographic Association's History website, which he has just completed. In 2017, Rao organized a symposium in Hyderabad, India at the International Congress and General Assembly, on William Duax, who was president and then Newsletter editor for International Union Of Crystallography Newsletter, on the eve of his retirement from IUCR. Rao published an article on Bill Duax in “Reflexions” (ACA Newsletter on line) after Bill's retirement as CEO of ACA. Rao was also requested to write the last 25-year history of the Graduate College at the University of Central Oklahoma for the occasion of completion of 125 years of the university. Rao is retiring as CFO of ACA on December 31, 2020, after serving the association as treasurer and CFO for 35 years.

Rao lives in Phoenix, Arizona with his family.
