= Marc Kirschner =

American biologist (born 1945)

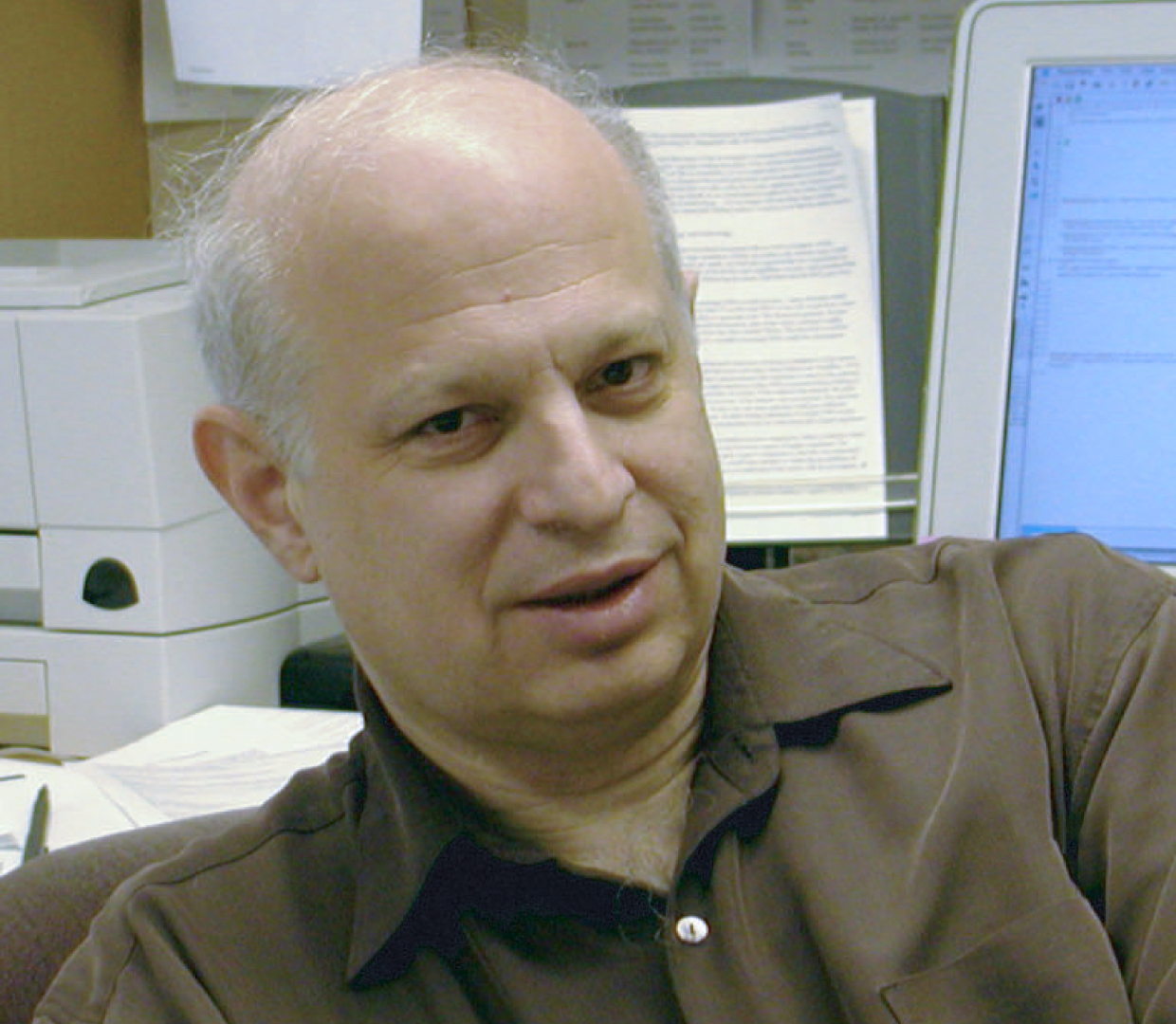
- Born: Marc Wallace Kirschner; February 28, 1945 (age 81); Chicago, Illinois, U.S.
- Education: University of California, Berkeley (PhD); Northwestern University (BA)
- Known for: cell cycle, embryonic development, facilitated evolution
- Scientific career
- Fields: Systems biology
- Workplaces: Harvard Medical School; University of California, San Francisco; Princeton University
- Thesis: Conformational changes in aspartate transcarbamylase (1971)
- Doctoral advisor: Howard Schachman
- Other academic advisors: John Gerhart; John Gurdon
- Doctoral students: Frank McKeon; Tim Mitchison
- Website: kirschner.hms.harvard.edu

Marc Wallace Kirschner (born February 28, 1945) is an American cell biologist and biochemist and the founding chair of the Department of Systems Biology at Harvard Medical School. He is known for major discoveries in cell and developmental biology related to the dynamics and function of the cytoskeleton, the regulation of the cell cycle, and the process of signaling in embryos, as well as the evolution of the vertebrate body plan. He is a leader in applying mathematical approaches to biology. He is the John Franklin Enders University Professor at Harvard University. In 1989 he was elected to the National Academy of Sciences. In 2021 he was elected to the American Philosophical Society.

== Early life and education ==
Kirschner was born in Chicago, Illinois, on February 28, 1945. He graduated from Northwestern University with a B.A. in chemistry in 1966. He participated in the NSF Graduate Research Fellowship Program at the National Science Foundation in 1966, and earned a doctorate in biochemistry from the University of California, Berkeley in 1971.

== Career ==
He held postdoctoral positions at University of California, Berkeley and at the University of Oxford in England. He became assistant professor at Princeton University in 1972. In 1978 he was made professor at the University of California, San Francisco. In 1993, he moved to Harvard Medical School, where he served as the chair of the new Department of Cell Biology for a decade. He became the founding chair of the HMS Department of Systems Biology in 2003. He was named the John Franklin Enders University Professor in 2009. In 2018, he was succeeded as Chair of the Department of Systems Biology by Galit Lahav.

Kirschner studies how cells divide, how they generate their shape, how they control their size, and how embryos develop. In his eclectic lab, developmental work on the frog coexists with biochemical work on mechanism of ubiquitination, cytoskeleton assembly or signal transduction.

At Princeton, his early work on microtubules established their unusual molecular assembly from tubulin proteins and identified the first microtubule-stabilizing protein tau, later shown to be a major component of the neurofibrillary tangles in Alzheimer's disease. In studies at UC San Francisco of the frog embryo as a model system of cell development, Kirschner identified the first inducer of embryonic differentiation, fibroblast growth factor (FGF), an early finding in the field of signal transduction.

Kirschner's lab is also known for uncovering basic mechanisms of the cell cycle in eukaryotic cells. Working in Xenopus (frog) egg extracts, Kirschner and Andrew Murray showed that cyclin synthesis drives the cell cycle and, later, that ubiquitin regulates levels of cyclin by marking the cell-cycle molecule for destruction. His lab discovered and purified many of the components involved in cell cycle progression, including anaphase promoting complex (APC), the complex that ubiquitinates cyclin B.

A second noted finding was his discovery, with Tim Mitchison, of the dynamic instability of microtubules, In mitosis, for example, microtubules form the spindle that separates the chromosomes. The first step in spindle formation is the nucleation of microtubules by microtubule-organizing centers, which then grow in all directions. Microtubules that attach to a chromosome are stabilized and are therefore retained to form part of the spindle. Because of dynamic instability, some individual microtubules that are not stabilized are at risk of collapse (or "catastrophe" as Kirschner named it), allowing re-use of the tubulin monomers. This recognition of self-organization in biological systems has been highly influential, and helped shape the view of the cytoplasm as a collection of dynamic molecular machines.

Kirschner is also interested in the evolutionary origins of the vertebrate body plan. Together with John Gerhart, he was instrumental in developing the acorn worm Saccoglossus kowalevskii into a model system that could be used to study the divergence between hemichordates and chordates, and the evolution of the chordate nervous system.

Kirschner is a pioneer in using mathematical approaches to learn about central biological questions. For example, a model of the Wnt pathway he developed in collaboration with the late Reinhart Heinrich showed that new properties and constraints emerge when the individual biochemical steps are combined into a complete pathway. A talk he gave on mathematics and the future of medicine at a retreat for Department Chairs at Harvard Medical School in 2003 inspired the Dean, Joseph B. Martin, to found a new Department, the Department of Systems Biology, with Kirschner as founding chair. Since then, Kirschner's lab has attracted many students and post-docs from theoretical backgrounds who wish to make the transition into biology. His lab is now a leader in using mathematical tools to analyze signaling pathways, cell size control, and the selectivity of drugs.

In two books co-authored with John Gerhart, Kirschner has described the cellular and developmental underpinnings of the evolution of organisms, and the concept of "evolvability". In the most recent book, Kirschner and Gerhart proposed a new theory of "facilitated variation" that aims to answer the question: How can small, random genetic changes be converted into useful changes in complex body parts?

=== Public service ===
Kirschner has been an advocate for federal biomedical research funding and served as first chair of the Joint Steering Committee for Public Policy, a coalition of scientific societies he helped create in 1993 to educate the U.S. Congress on biomedical research and lobby for public funding of it. In 2014, Kirschner (together with Bruce Alberts, Shirley Tilghman and Harold Varmus) called for a number of changes to the system of US biomedical science, with the intention of reducing "hypercompetition" This publication led to the formation of an organization, Rescuing Biomedical Research, that aims to collect community input and propose changes to the structure of academic science in the USA.

Kirschner helped launch the monthly, peer-reviewed journal PLoS Biology in October 2003 as a member of the editorial board and senior author of a paper in the inaugural issue. The journal was the first publishing venture from the San Francisco-based Public Library of Science (PLoS), which had begun three years previously as a grassroots organization of scientists advocating free and unrestricted access to the scientific literature

=== Books ===
- with John Gerhart, Cells, Embryos, and Evolution: Toward a Cellular and Developmental Understanding of Phenotypic Variation and Evolutionary Adaptability (Blackwell's, 1997) ISBN 0-86542-574-4
- with John Gerhart, The Plausibility of Life: Resolving Darwin's Dilemma (Yale University Press 2005) ISBN 0-300-10865-6

== Awards, Honorary Degrees and Associations ==
- 1989–present: Member, National Academy of Sciences
- 1989–present: Member, American Academy of Arts and Sciences
- 1990–1991: President, American Society for Cell Biology
- 1991: Richard Lounsbery Award
- 1996: Public Service Award, American Society for Cell Biology
- 1999–present: Foreign Member, Royal Society of London
- 1999–present: Foreign Member, Academia Europaea
- 2000: Honorary Degree, Doctor of Sciences, University of Chicago
- 2001: William C. Rose Award, American Society for Biochemistry and Molecular Biology
- 2001: Gairdner Foundation International Award (Canada)
- 2003: Rabbi Shai Shacknai Memorial Prize in Immunology and Cancer Research, Hebrew University-Hadassah Medical School, Jerusalem
- 2003: E.B. Wilson Medal, American Society for Cell Biology (the ASCB's highest honor)
- 2004: Dickson Prize for Science, Carnegie Mellon University
- 2015: Harvey Prize, Technion Institute, Israel
- 2023: Honorary PhD, Rockefeller University
- 2025: Honorary Degree, Doctor of Sciences, Northwestern University
