= Biology Today: An Issues Approach =

Book by Edwin Harris Colbert

- Author: Edwin H. Colbert, Michael Morales, Eli C. Minkoff, Pamela J. Baker
- Language: English
- Subject: Biology Textbook
- Publisher: Garland Science
- Publication date: February 21, 1996
- Pages: 768
- ISBN: 0070426295 (First edition ISBN)
- OCLC: 52295302
- Dewey Decimal: 570 21
- LC Class: QH315 .M63 2004

Biology Today: An Issues Approach is a college-oriented Biology textbook by Eli C. Minkoff and Pamela J. Baker designed to integrate the teaching of biological concepts within the context of current societal issues relating to these topics. It is the original issues-oriented introductory-level general biology textbook. The latest edition is currently published by the textbooks division of Garland Science. It is 768 pages long.

== About the Book ==
Unlike other introductory-level general biology textbooks, Biology Today: An Issues Approach is unique in the sense that it has an issues-oriented approach towards the teaching of biology concepts which emphasizes coherent understanding of the given material. The goal of the book isn't to give any straightforward answers to any of the questions that the text brings up - instead it gives the reader the information necessary to formulate his or her own opinion. Critical thinking is stressed throughout the reading.

== Format ==
The book's format includes opening each chapter with an Issues section that states the underlying questions within the chapter's frameset. Many critical issues are raised throughout each chapter. Some examples of different chapters in the book are HIV and AIDS (16), Drugs and Addiction (14), and The Population Explosion (9). Thought questions at the end of each chapter bring up some of the chapter's initial issues raised on critical questions and allow for class discussion and student participation.

== Reception ==
Reception for the book has been positive. The Quarterly Review of Biology gave a positive review for the text in 1997 and 2005, with the reviewer in 2005 calling it "an excellent textbook" and praising the website associated with the book. BioScience also gave praise for the book, commenting upon its layout and approach.
