= Joseph Zornado =

American professor and author

Joseph L. Zornado (14 December 1964) is an American professor and author. He wrote a book about children's literature, Inventing the Child (Garland Publishing, 2000), as well as a science fiction trilogy, 2050: A Future History.

== Early life ==
Zornado was born in San Diego, California, on December 14, 1964.

== Career ==
His book Inventing the Child (Garland Publishing, 2000) is an account of childhood through fiction. Zornado analyzes several of the dominant notions of childhood which led to this moment, such as those of Calvin, Freud, and Rousseau, and finally, the "consumer childhood" era of Benjamin Spock and television. He argues that the stories told to children, from fairy tales to Disney movies, perpetuate the materialism and conformity of dominant culture. The book has been praised by writers such as Daniel Quinn, who called it "among the two or three most eye-opening, illuminating, and important books I've ever read."

Speculative Fiction Review published the first volume of Zornado's 2050 trilogy, Iron Diesel Press published the second, and Merry Blacksmith Press published the third volume. 2050: A Future History is set two thousand years after the fall of civilization, when a wanderer named Vilb sets out on a journey and discovers that his destiny is controlled by "the gods," remnants of ancient human beings. It is set in a post-apocalyptic Antarctica, which, though habitable, remains extremely dry; the lack of water and food has put the new "Little Earth" on a course for crisis.

Zornado is professor of English and former director of the Faculty Center for Teaching and Learning at Rhode Island College in Providence, Rhode Island.

== Publications ==
=== Nonfiction ===
- Inventing the Child: Culture, Ideology, and the Story of Childhood. New York: Garland Science. 2000. ISBN 9780815335245.
- Disney and the Dialectic of Desire: Fantasy as Social Practice. Palgrave Macmillan. 2017. ISBN 978-3-319-62677-2.
- Professional Writing for Social Work Practice. With Daniel Weisman (Second ed.). New York: Springer Publishing. 2017. ISBN 978-0-8261-7814-5.
- Professional Writing for the Criminal Justice System. With Jill Harrison and Daniel Weisman. New York: Springer Publishing. 2017. ISBN 978-0-8261-9448-0.
- Critical Thinking: Developing the Intellectual Tools for Social Justice. With Jill Harrison and Daniel Weisman. New York: Routledge. 2019. ISBN 978-0-429-43954-4.

=== 2050: A Future History trilogy ===
- Gods of Little Earth. Speculative Fiction Review. 2007. ISBN 9780978523237.
- The Power at the Bottom of the World. Iron Diesel Press. 2012. ISBN 9780983125235.
- When Immortals Reign. Merry Blacksmith Press. 2015. ISBN 9780692471630.
