= Julia Hart =

Julia Hart may refer to:

- Julia Hart (filmmaker) (born 1982), American filmmaker and actress
- Julia Hart (wrestler) (born 2001), American pro-wrestler
- Julia Hart, New Zealand national champion pole vaulter; see List of pole vault national champions (women)
- Julia Hart (19th century), daughter of Isaiah Hart and namesake of the city street in Jacksonville
- Julia Catherine Beckwith Hart (1796–1867), Canadian novelist
- Julia Hart, British Green politician who participated in the 2017 Warwickshire County Council election
- Adelaide Julia Hart (1900–1995), American political activist

== See also ==
- Julia Haart (born 1971), American fashion designer
- Julie Hart (disambiguation)
