= Lillian Hatcher =

American riveter, union organizer

- Born: May 30, 1915; Greenville, Alabama
- Died: 1998 (aged 82–83)
- Occupations: Riveter, union organizer
- Known for: Union organizing

Lillian Hatcher (1915–1998) was an African American riveter and union organizer. She was employed at the Briggs aircraft plant in Detroit when she first became active in union organizing after the company transferred a group of female employees, white and black, all of whom had children, to the midnight shift.

== Life and work ==
Lillian Hatcher was born on May 30, 1915, in Greenville, Alabama. She graduated from Northeastern High School in Detroit and attended workers' extension classes at the University of Michigan in the early 1940s. In 1943 she began work as an aircraft riveter and as one of the first Black women hired at Chrysler's Briggs-Connor Plant. In that same year she joined the United Auto Workers (UAW) union, Local 742 (later Local 212). In 1943, Hatcher organized the local's first women's conference in February of that year.

In 1944 she was elected to the local's executive board and was also appointed the first Black female international representative of the UAW. During World War II, the U.S. economy offered black women “their first meaningful opportunity for upward occupational mobility. Thousands moved from low-paid, nonunion agricultural and service jobs to higher-paying, union-protected manufacturing jobs.”

Hatcher began work as an assistant director to the War Policy Division Women's Bureau. When the Women's Bureau was transferred to the Fair Practices and Anti-Discrimination Department in 1946, Hatcher joined its staff. In 1958 she moved to the Women's Department where she was primarily responsible for organizing and participating in classes and conferences for female union members, and for maintaining close ties with numerous local and national organizations concerned with civil rights.

Hatcher became the coordinator of the Women's Auxiliaries, which moved to the Women's Department in 1971, and she remained on the department staff until she retired from the UAW in June 1980.

Throughout her years as an organizer, Hatcher was actively involved in many city and state activities including the Detroit Human Rights Department (1958–1974); the Michigan Constitutional Convention (1961) and the Michigan Commission on Legislative Apportionment (1971–1972). She also participated at the national level with the NAACP, the National Council of Negro Women and many other organizations pursuing civil rights and those of women.

She also remained heavily involved in the politics of the Democratic Party throughout her life.

== See also ==
- Con-Con Eleven
