= Kazutoshi Mori =

Japanese molecular biologist (born 1958)

- 森 和俊
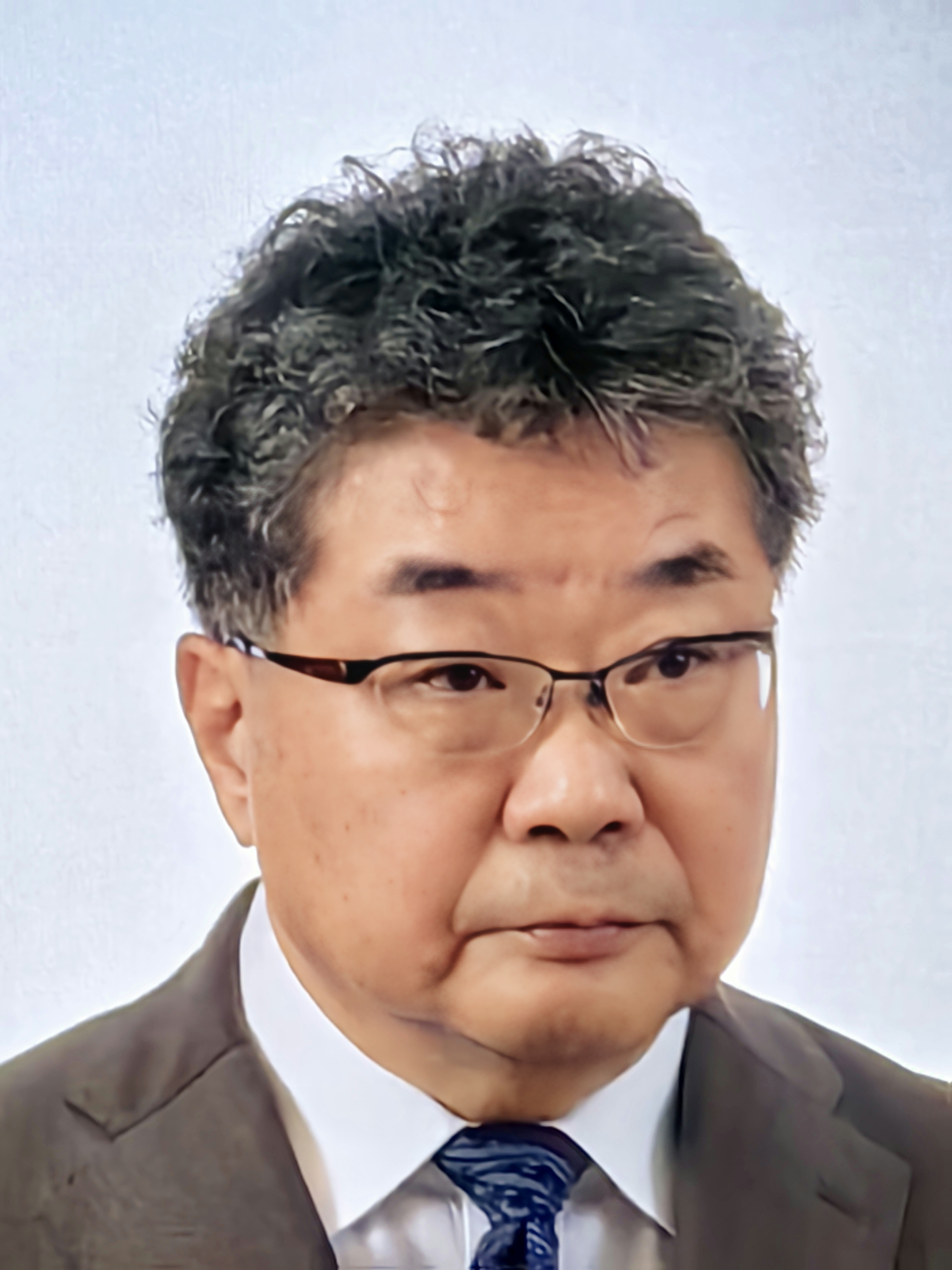
- Kazutoshi Mori
- Born: 7 July 1958 (age 68); Kurashiki, Okayama
- Education: Kyoto University
- Known for: Unfolded protein response
- Awards: Wiley Prize in Biomedical Science (2005); Gairdner Award (2009); Shaw Prize (2014); Lasker Award (2014); Imperial Prize (2016); Breakthrough Prize in Life Sciences (2018); Keio Medical Science Prize (2023)
- Scientific career
- Fields: Molecular biology Cell biology
- Workplaces: Kyoto University

Kazutoshi Mori (森 和俊, Mori Kazutoshi; born 1958) is a Japanese molecular biologist known for research on unfolded protein response. He was a professor of Biophysics at the Graduate School of Science, Kyoto University, and shared the 2014 Albert Lasker Basic Medical Research Award with Peter Walter for discoveries concerning the unfolded protein response — an intracellular quality control system that detects harmful misfolded proteins in the endoplasmic reticulum and signals the nucleus to carry out corrective measures. After retirement, he became a distinguished professor at Institute for Advanced Study, Kyoto University, in 2024. He is a professor at Faculty of Pharmacy, Meijo University since April, 2026.

== Early life and education ==
Mori was born in 1958 in Kurashiki, Okayama. In the elementary school era, he was good at mathematics and arithmetic, and learned from the newspaper about the existence of quarks. In the middle school era, he was influenced by the Nobel Prize in Physics of Hideki Yukawa, and he decided to study physics at the Faculty of Science at Kyoto University (at the time, the golden age of elementary particle physics). However, he was finally admitted to the Department of Synthetic Chemistry of the Faculty of Engineering at Kyoto University.

When Mori was in the first year of college, he did not understand the significant difference between the laws of physics and chemistry, but he learned about the new development of molecular biology from newspaper articles. Soon after, Kyoto University alumnus Susumu Tonegawa made a breakthrough in immunology research (which earned Tonegawa the first Japanese Nobel Prize in Physiology or Medicine about a decade later), Mori read about it in the newspaper and was shocked, then he decided to transfer to the Faculty of Pharmaceutical Sciences and continue to pursue graduate studies. In 1987, he obtained a doctorate degree.

== Career ==
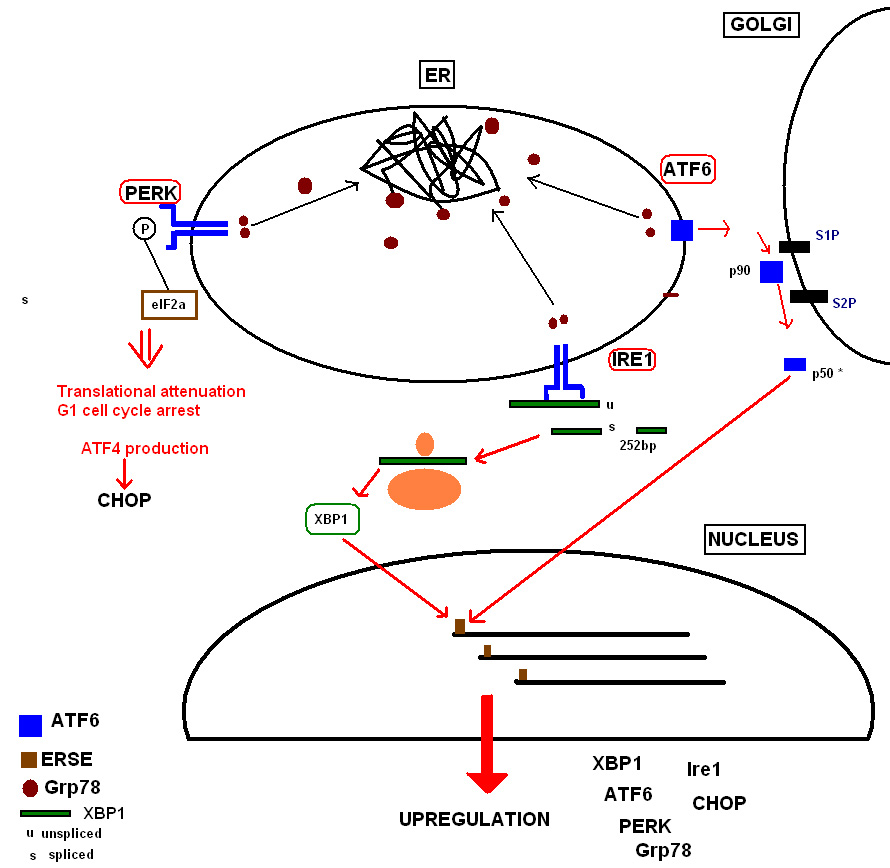
A simplified diagram of the initiation of the UPR by prolonged and overwhelming protein misfolding

Mori was appointed as an assistant professor at Gifu Pharmaceutical University in 1985, before becoming a postdoctoral fellow at the University of Texas Southwestern Medical Center in 1989, and he began research on unfolded protein response (UPR) in the United States. He was a researcher at the HSP (Heat Shock Protein) Research Institute in Kyoto from 1993 to 1999, and has been a member of the faculty of Kyoto University since 1999. Meanwhile, he completed the copying of HAC1, ATF6 and BP1.

The independent works of Mori and Peter Walter during the same period revealed the UPR pathway, which explains the mechanism by which cells generate signals due to stress and regulate. They discovered the inositol-requiring enzyme 1 (Ire1) in 1993, which communicates the state of the endoplasmic reticulum protein production line. These research uncovered to form the basis for understanding and treating a wide range of important diseases such as cancer, metabolic disorders including obesity, diabetes, fatty liver and dyslipidemia, a number of neurodegenerative diseases, and inflammatory diseases.

In 2003, Mori was transferred to the Department of Biophysics (Division of Biological Sciences) of Graduate School of Science at Kyoto University, the academic unit is also the first laboratory for molecular biology in Japan and has a long history.

== Recognition ==
- 2005: Wiley Prize in Biomedical Sciences
- 2009: Canada Gairdner International Award
- 2010: Medal with Purple Ribbon
- 2013: Asahi Prize
- 2014: Shaw Prize in Life Science and Medicine
- 2014: Albert Lasker Basic Medical Research Award
- 2015: Thomson Reuters Citation Laureates
- 2016: Imperial Prize of the Japan Academy
- 2016 and 2019: Asian Scientist 100, Asian Scientist
- 2018: Breakthrough Prize in Life Sciences
- 2018: Person of Cultural Merit
- 2018: Momofuku Ando Prize
- 2023: Keio Medical Science Prize
- 2023: BBVA Foundation Frontiers of Knowledge Award

== Personal life ==
Mori obtained the qualification of the fifth section of Kendo in 1998. He also briefly taught Kendo in elementary school (when his son attended the school at the time).
