= Microsoft Award =

Annual scientific award given by the Royal Society and the Académie des sciences

The Royal Society and Académie des sciences Microsoft Award was an annual award given by the Royal Society and the Académie des sciences to scientists working in Europe who had made a major contribution to the advancement of science through the use of computational methods. It was sponsored by Microsoft Research.

The award was open to any research scientist who had made a significant contribution at the intersection of computing and the sciences covering Biological Sciences, Physical Sciences, Mathematics and Engineering. The prize recognized the importance of interdisciplinary research at the interface of science and computing for advancing scientific boundaries, as well as the importance of investing in European scientists to give Europe a competitive science base. The recipient was selected by a Committee comprising members of the Académie des sciences and Fellows of the Royal Society. The prize consisted of a trophy and monetary amount of €250,000, of which €7,500 is prize money and the rest earmarked for further research.

The first award was made in 2006 and the last in 2009. It has now been replaced by the Royal Society Milner Award.

== List of winners ==
Year	Winner	Affiliation	Awarded for:	Earmarked prize toward:	Ref.
2006	Dennis Bray	University of Cambridge	Computer simulated chemotaxis of E. coli	Set-up of a computational facility to provide computational power for molecular simulations of bacterial chemotaxis.	
2007	Giorgio Parisi	La Sapienza	quantum chromodynamics and spin glasses	A project called IANUS that utilized field programmable gate arrays (FPGAs) as a simulator of complex systems.	
2008	Nicholas Ayache	INRIA	medical image analysis	Statistics of three-dimensional shapes, the combination of several imaging modalities, and the development of computational models combining anatomy and physiology.	
2009	Peer Bork	EMBL	Computational analysis of the human microbiome.		

== Microsoft Award today ==
Today, Microsoft is giving awards for top-performing partners in various countries.

== See also ==
- List of computer-related awards
- List of computer science awards
