= Burnley Borough Council =

English non-metropolitan district council in Lancashire, England, UK

Type
- Type: Non-metropolitan district

History
- Founded: 1 April 1974

Leadership
- Mayor: Saeed Chaudhary, Independent since 21 May 2026
- Leader: Afrasiab Anwar, Independent since 19 May 2021
- Chief Executive: Lukman Patel since July 2023

Structure
- Seats: 45 councillors
- Graph of the party split among 45 seats.
- Political groups: Administration (19) Independent (10) Liberal Democrats (6) Green (3) Other parties (26) Reform (12) Labour (10) Conservative (3) Restore (1)

Elections
- Voting system: First past the post
- Last election: 7 May 2026

Meeting place
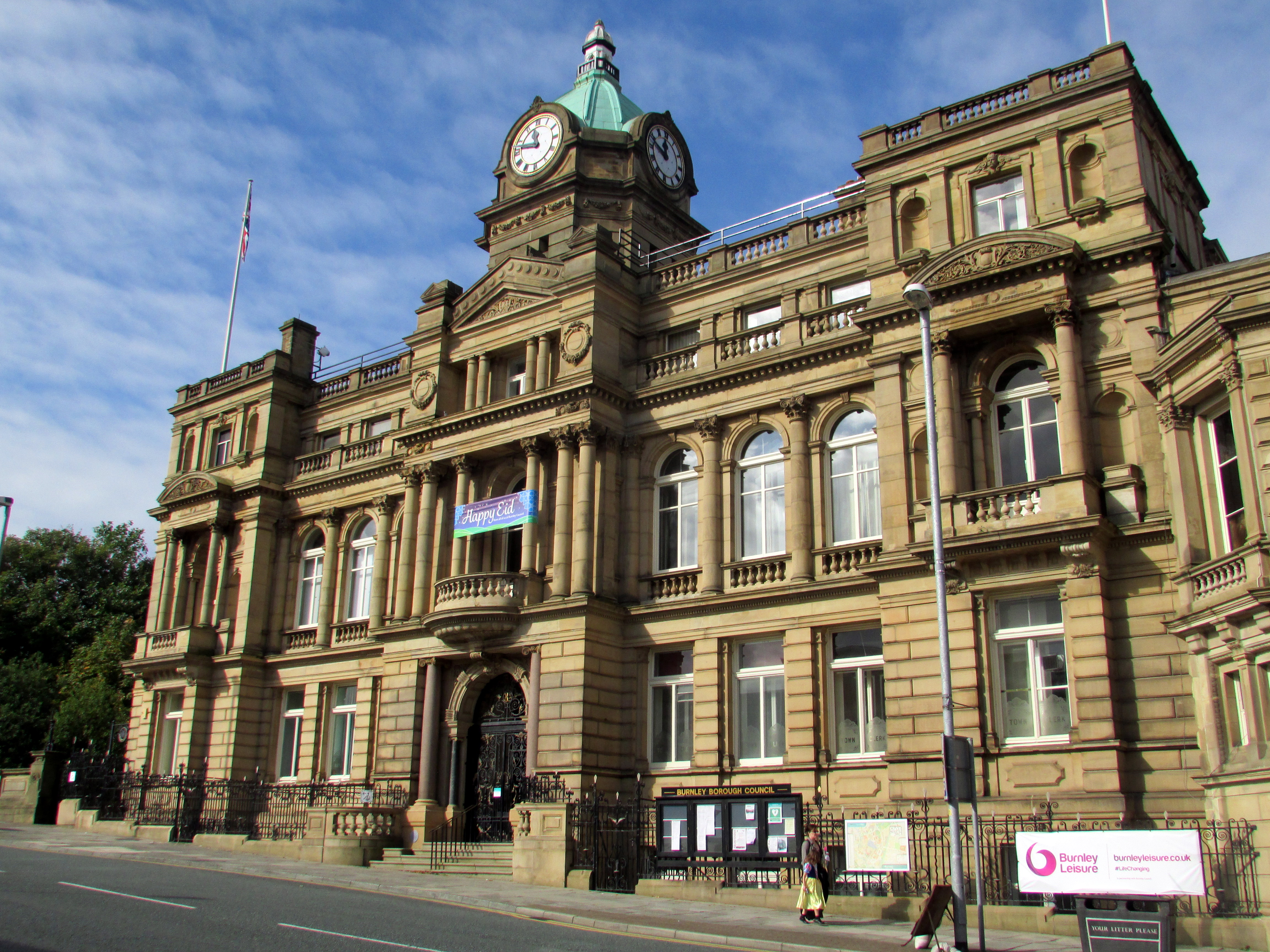
- Town Hall, Manchester Road, Burnley, BB11 9SA

Website
- www.burnley.gov.uk

Burnley Borough Council provides district-level services for the Borough of Burnley, in Lancashire, in North West England. County-level services are provided by Lancashire County Council. Much of the borough is also covered by civil parishes, which form a third tier of local government.

== History ==
The town of Burnley had been incorporated as a municipal borough in 1861. The larger modern borough and its council were created in 1974 under the Local Government Act 1972.

=== Political control ===
The council has been under no overall control since 2019.

Following the 2023 election, Labour ran a minority administration in Burnley council, having 21 seats, leaving them two seats short of an overall majority. On 5 November 2023, council leader Afrasiab Anwar and ten Labour colleagues resigned from the Labour Party in protest at Keir Starmer's refusal to demand a ceasefire in the Gaza war. This group was subsequently known as the Burnley Independent Group. On 17 November, the council was taken over by the new "Co-operative Alliance", which comprised the Burnley Independent Group, Green Party, and Liberal Democrat councillors and had enough seats to hold an overall majority on Burnley Council.

Following the 2024 election, the coalition fell one short of a majority, with only 22 councillors. Despite this, the Alliance members agreed to continue their arrangement and continue running the council, relying on the independent mayor to use his casting vote in their favour in case of a drawn vote with Labour and the Conservatives. The coalition lost further seats at the 2026 election, but continued to be able to form a minority administration.

The first election to the reformed borough council was held in 1973, initially operating as a shadow authority alongside the outgoing authorities before coming into its powers on 1 April 1974. Political control of the council since 1974 has been as follows:

Party	Period
Labour	1974–2000
No overall control	2000–2001
Labour	2001–2004
No overall control	2004–2008
Liberal Democrats	2008–2011
No overall control	2011–2012
Labour	2012–2019
No overall control	2019–present

=== Leadership ===
The role of mayor is largely ceremonial in Burnley. Political leadership is instead provided by the leader of the council. The leaders since 1980 have been:

Councillor	Party	From	To
John Entwistle	Labour		May 1980
Peter Pike	Labour	May 1980	May 1983
Ken McGeorge	Labour	1983	1987
Jesse Bradshaw	Labour	1987	May 1989
Ken McGeorge	Labour	May 1989	May 1994
Kath Reade	Labour	May 1994	May 1998
Stuart Caddy	Labour	May 1998	25 Aug 2004
Stuart Caddy	Labour	29 Sep 2004	May 2006
Gordon Birtwistle	Liberal Democrats	May 2006	2010
Charlie Briggs	Liberal Democrats	2010	2012
Julie Cooper	Labour	2012	2014
Mark Townsend	Labour	2014	15 May 2019
Charlie Briggs	Burnley and Padiham Independent Party	29 May 2019	18 Sep 2020
Mark Townsend	Labour	30 Sep 2020	May 2021
Afrasiab Anwar	Labour	19 May 2021	5 Nov 2023
Afrasiab Anwar	Independent	5 Nov 2023	

=== Composition ===
Following the May 2026 election and a subsequent change of allegiance later in May 2026, composition of the council was:

Party	Seats
Reform	12
Labour	10
Liberal Democrats	6
Conservative	3
Green	3
Restore	1
Independent	10
Total	45

The independent councillors sit together as the 'Burnley Independent Group', which forms part of the council's administration with the Liberal Democrats and Greens. The next elections are due in 2027.

=== Elections ===
Since the last boundary changes in 2002 the council has comprised 45 councillors representing 15 wards, with each ward electing three councillors. Elections are held three years out of every four, with a third of the council (one councillor for each ward) elected each time for a four year term of office. Lancashire County Council elections are held in the fourth year of the cycle when there are no borough council elections.

The wards are:

- Bank Hall
- Briercliffe
- Brunshaw
- Cliviger with Worsthorne
- Coal Clough with Deerplay
- Daneshouse with Stoneyholme
- Gannow
- Gawthorpe
- Hapton with Park
- Lanehead
- Queensgate
- Rosegrove with Lowerhouse
- Rosehill with Burnley Wood
- Trinity
- Whittlefield with Ightenhill

The district is represented on Lancashire County Council in six divisions: Burnley Central East, Burnley Central West, Burnley North East, Burnley South West, Burnley Rural and Padiham & Burnley West.

The boundaries of the Burnley Parliamentary constituency are the same as those of the borough.

=== Premises ===
The council is based at Burnley Town Hall on Manchester Road, which had been completed in 1888 for the old town council. The council has additional offices nearby at the old Burnley Building Society building on Parker Lane.
