= 2024 Burnley Borough Council election =

Local election in Burnley, England

- 2 May 2024

15 out of 45 seats to Burnley Borough Council 23 seats needed for a majority

	Majority party	Minority party	Third party
Leader	Mark Townsend	(Note: Ten of the eleven independents prior to the election sat together as the 'Burnley Independent Group', led by Afrasiab Anwar.)	Alan Hosker
Party	Labour	Independent	Conservative
Leader's seat	Brunshaw		Hapton with Park
Seats before	11	12	8
Seats after	15	10	8
Seat change	▲4	▼2	Steady
	Fourth party	Fifth party
Leader	Howard Baker	Scott Cunliffe
Party	Liberal Democrats	Green
Leader's seat	Coalclough with Deerplay	Cliviger with Worsthorne
Seats before	7	7
Seats after	7	5
Seat change	Steady	▼2
- The winner of each seat in the 2024 Burnley Borough Council Election
Leader before election
Afrasiab Anwar
Independent
No overall control
Leader after election
Afrasiab Anwar
Independent
No overall control

The 2024 Burnley Borough Council election was held on Thursday 2 May 2024, alongside the other local elections in the United Kingdom on the same day. One-third of the 45 members of Burnley Borough Council in Lancashire were elected.

== Summary ==
Prior to the election, the council was under no overall control. Following the previous election in 2023, a minority Labour administration had been running the council. However, in October 2023, eleven councillors left the Labour Party over the party's stance on the Gaza war. They then sat as a group of independent councillors called the 'Burnley Independent Group', which formed a coalition with the Liberal Democrats and Green Party, which together held a majority of the seats on the council.

The 2024 election saw the Labour Party regain some of the seats they had held at the 2023 election. However, they were unable to secure a majority of the seats, and the council remained under no overall control. The coalition of the Burnley Independent Group, Liberal Democrats and Greens continued to form the council's administration after the election, albeit as a minority administration having lost the majority it had held prior to the election.

== Previous council composition ==
After 2023 election		Before 2024 election		After 2024 election	
Party	Seats	Party	Seats	Party	Seats
Labour	21	Labour	11	Labour	15
Independent	0	Independent	12	Independent	10
Conservative	7	Conservative	8	Conservative	8
Liberal Democrats	7	Liberal Democrats	7	Liberal Democrats	7
Green	7	Green	7	Green	5
BAPIP	3	BAPIP	0	BAPIP	Dissolved

=== Changes between the 2023 and 2024 elections ===
- August 2023: BAPIP dissolved - Charlie Briggs, Neil Mottershead and Mark Payne sit as independents
- September 2023: Charlie Briggs (independent) joins Labour; Andy Fewings (Green) resigns - by-election held October 2023
- October 2023: Afrasiab Anwar, Saeed Chaudhary, Shah Hussain, Mohammed Ishtiaq, Nussrat Kazmi, Syeda Kazmi, Arif Khan, Lubna Khan, Sehrish Lone, Asif Raja, and Christine Sollis leave Labour to sit as independents; (Note: Sit as part of the Burnley Independent Group, which is not registered as a political party) Alexander Hall (Green) wins by-election
- February 2024: Neil Mottershead (independent) joins Conservatives

== Results ==
Borough of Burnley Council's composition after the 2024 local elections

2024 Burnley Borough Council election
Party	This election			Full council			This election		
Party	Seats	Net	Seats %	Other	Total	Total %	Votes	Votes %	+/−
Labour	6	▲4	40.0	9	15	33.3	6,345	32.4	-9.8
Conservative	3	Steady	20.0	5	8	17.8	5,159	26.3	+3.8
Independent	3	▼2	20.0	7	10	22.2	4,292	21.9	+16.8
Liberal Democrats	2	Steady	13.3	5	7	15.6	1,804	9.2	-4.3
Green	1	▼2	6.7	4	5	11.1	1,981	10.1	-6.6

== Ward results ==
The Statement of Persons Nominated, which details the candidates standing in each ward, was released by Burnley Borough Council following the close of nominations. The ward electorates and turnout percentages are reported in a compiled summary of the election results. An asterisk denotes an incumbent councillor seeking re-election.

=== Bank Hall ===
Bank Hall
Party	Candidate	Votes	%	±%
Independent	Lubna Khan*	737	55.0	N/A
Labour	Hannah Till	456	34.0	−40.1
Conservative	Susan Nutter	147	11.0	+0.6
Majority		281		
Turnout			32.1	
Registered electors		4,224		
Independent gain from Labour		Swing		

Lubna Khan was elected in 2021 as a Labour councillor.

=== Briercliffe ===
Briercliffe
Party	Candidate	Votes	%	±%
Liberal Democrats	Margaret Lishman*	497	41.1	−8.5
Labour	Pete Coles	468	38.7	+10.0
Conservative	Richard Sagar	182	15.1	−2.6
Green	Julie Hurt	61	5.0	+1.0
Majority		29		
Turnout			28.6	
Registered electors		4,270		
Liberal Democrats hold		Swing		

=== Brunshaw ===
Brunshaw
Party	Candidate	Votes	%	±%
Labour	Shaun Sproule	520	50.6	+5.3
Green	Andrew Newhouse	268	26.1	−14.6
Conservative	Claire Ingham	209	20.4	+6.4
Independent	Mubashar Lone	30	2.9	N/A
Majority		252		
Turnout			23.1	
Registered electors		4,495		
Labour gain from Green		Swing		

=== Cliviger with Worsthorne ===
Cliviger with Worsthorne
Party	Candidate	Votes	%	±%
Conservative	Ivor Emo	955	54.7	+12.7
Green	Scott Cunliffe*	575	32.9	−11.2
Labour	Carol Lukey	161	9.2	+0.9
Liberal Democrats	Gorgyanna Kenzington	55	3.2	−2.4
Majority		380		
Turnout			40.9	
Registered electors		4,298		
Conservative gain from Green		Swing		

=== Coal Clough with Deerplay ===
Coal Clough with Deerplay
Party	Candidate	Votes	%	±%
Liberal Democrats	Jacqueline Inckle*	450	40.4	−6.6
Labour	Jeff Slee	380	34.1	+11.2
Conservative	Tom Watson	210	18.8	−1.7
Green	Anna Hewitt	75	6.7	−2.9
Majority		70		
Turnout			28.8	
Registered electors		3,891		
Liberal Democrats hold		Swing		

=== Daneshouse with Stoneyholme ===
Daneshouse with Stoneyholme
Party	Candidate	Votes	%	±%
Independent	Saeed Chaudhary*	1,143	54.8	N/A
Liberal Democrats	Ikram Rafiq	375	18.0	+1.6
Conservative	Mohammed Saleh	340	16.3	+12.7
Labour	James Harrison	227	10.9	−65.6
Majority		768		
Turnout			43.4	
Registered electors		4,853		
Independent gain from Labour		Swing		

Saeed Chaudhary was elected in 2021 as a Labour councillor.

=== Gannow ===
Gannow
Party	Candidate	Votes	%	±%
Labour	Gemma Haigh	590	59.4	+22.6
Conservative	Rhys Williams	269	27.1	+17.8
Green	Lewis Bridges	71	7.1	+1.5
Liberal Democrats	Kathryn Haworth	47	4.7	N/A
Independent	Khalil Pascall	17	1.7	N/A
Majority		321		
Turnout			22.8	
Registered electors		4,429		
Labour gain from BAPIP		Swing		

=== Gawthorpe ===
Gawthorpe
Party	Candidate	Votes	%	±%
Labour	Barbara Dole	658	60.8	−4.6
Conservative	Karen Ingham*	424	39.2	+11.2
Majority		234		
Turnout			25.3	
Registered electors		4,338		
Labour gain from Conservative		Swing		

=== Hapton with Park ===
Hapton with Park
Party	Candidate	Votes	%	±%
Conservative	Alan Hosker*	765	61.1	+6.0
Labour	Elaine Cotterell	380	30.3	−5.6
Green	Sarah Hall	108	8.6	−0.4
Majority		385		
Turnout			26.2	
Registered electors		4,804		
Conservative hold		Swing		

=== Lanehead ===
Lanehead
Party	Candidate	Votes	%	±%
Labour	Andy Waddington	715	42.4	−8.1
Independent	Asif Raja*	712	42.2	N/A
Conservative	Abdul Shahid	261	15.5	−11.3
Majority		3		
Turnout			37.3	
Registered electors		4,577		
Labour hold		Swing		

Asif Raja was elected in 2021 as a Labour councillor.

=== Queensgate ===
Queensgate
Party	Candidate	Votes	%	±%
Independent	Aurangzeb Ali	1,184	69.2	N/A
Labour	Keith Till	343	20.0	−48.7
Conservative	Bailey Webster	184	10.8	−2.2
Majority		841		
Turnout			40.1	
Registered electors		4,323		
Independent gain from Labour		Swing		

=== Rosegrove with Lowerhouse ===
Rosegrove with Lowerhouse
Party	Candidate	Votes	%	±%
Labour	Ashley Brown	395	37.4	−7.5
Conservative	Abbey Hartley	286	27.1	+12.5
Independent	Bea Foster	283	26.8	N/A
Green	Chris Bridges	91	8.6	+3.4
Majority		109		
Turnout			21.7	
Registered electors		4,854		
Labour hold		Swing		

=== Rosehill with Burnley Wood ===
Rosehill with Burnley Wood
Party	Candidate	Votes	%	±%
Labour	Bill Horrocks*	467	41.2	+2.8
Liberal Democrats	Russell Neal	380	33.5	−3.9
Conservative	Simon Bonney	195	17.2	+3.8
Green	Fi Hornby	92	8.1	+2.7
Majority		87		
Turnout			25.7	
Registered electors		4,453		
Labour gain from Conservative		Swing		

This seat was gained by Labour in a by-election in November 2022.

=== Trinity ===
Trinity
Party	Candidate	Votes	%	±%
Green	Martyn Hurt*	396	52.0	−12.0
Labour	Tony Martin	280	36.8	+9.8
Conservative	Dale Ferrier	85	11.2	+2.2
Majority		116		
Turnout			19.0	
Registered electors		4,025		
Green hold		Swing		

=== Whittlefield with Ightenhill ===
Whittlefield with Ightenhill
Party	Candidate	Votes	%	±%
Conservative	Don Whitaker*	647	46.8	+4.9
Labour	Liam Walsh	305	22.1	+6.0
Green	Duncan Reed	244	17.7	−14.0
Independent	David Roper	139	10.1	N/A
Independent	Mitchell Cryer	47	3.4	−2.6
Majority		342		
Turnout			30.5	
Registered electors		4,554		
Conservative hold		Swing		

== By-elections ==
=== Lanehead ===
Lanehead by-election: 4 November 2025
Party	Candidate	Votes	%	±%
Independent	Shiraz Ahmed	706	44.4	+2.2
Reform	Gavin Theaker	510	32.1	N/A
Labour	Millie Towers	262	16.5	–25.9
Conservative	Dale Ferrier	61	3.8	–11.7
Green	Affan Burki	50	3.1	N/A
Majority		196	12.3	N/A
Turnout		1,594	34.0	
Registered electors		4,687		
Independent gain from Labour				

The Lanehead by-election was triggered by the resignation of councillor Fiona Wild, who stepped down after a Facebook post in which she described the assassination of right-wing commentator Charlie Kirk as "good riddance".

=== Queensgate ===
Queensgate by-election: 4 November 2025
Party	Candidate	Votes	%	±%
Independent	Musharaf Parvez	679	55.7	–13.5
Reform	Victoria Fletcher	240	19.7	N/A
Labour	Dylan Rea	133	10.9	–9.1
Green	Janet Hall	71	5.8	N/A
Independent	Javad Mokhammad	52	4.3	N/A
Conservative	Susan Nutter	43	3.5	–7.3
Majority		439	36.0	N/A
Turnout		1,221	27.2	
Registered electors		4,483		
Independent gain from Labour				

The Queensgate by-election was triggered by the resignation of independent councillor Syeda Kazmi.
