= 2026 Burnley Borough Council election =

2026 English local election

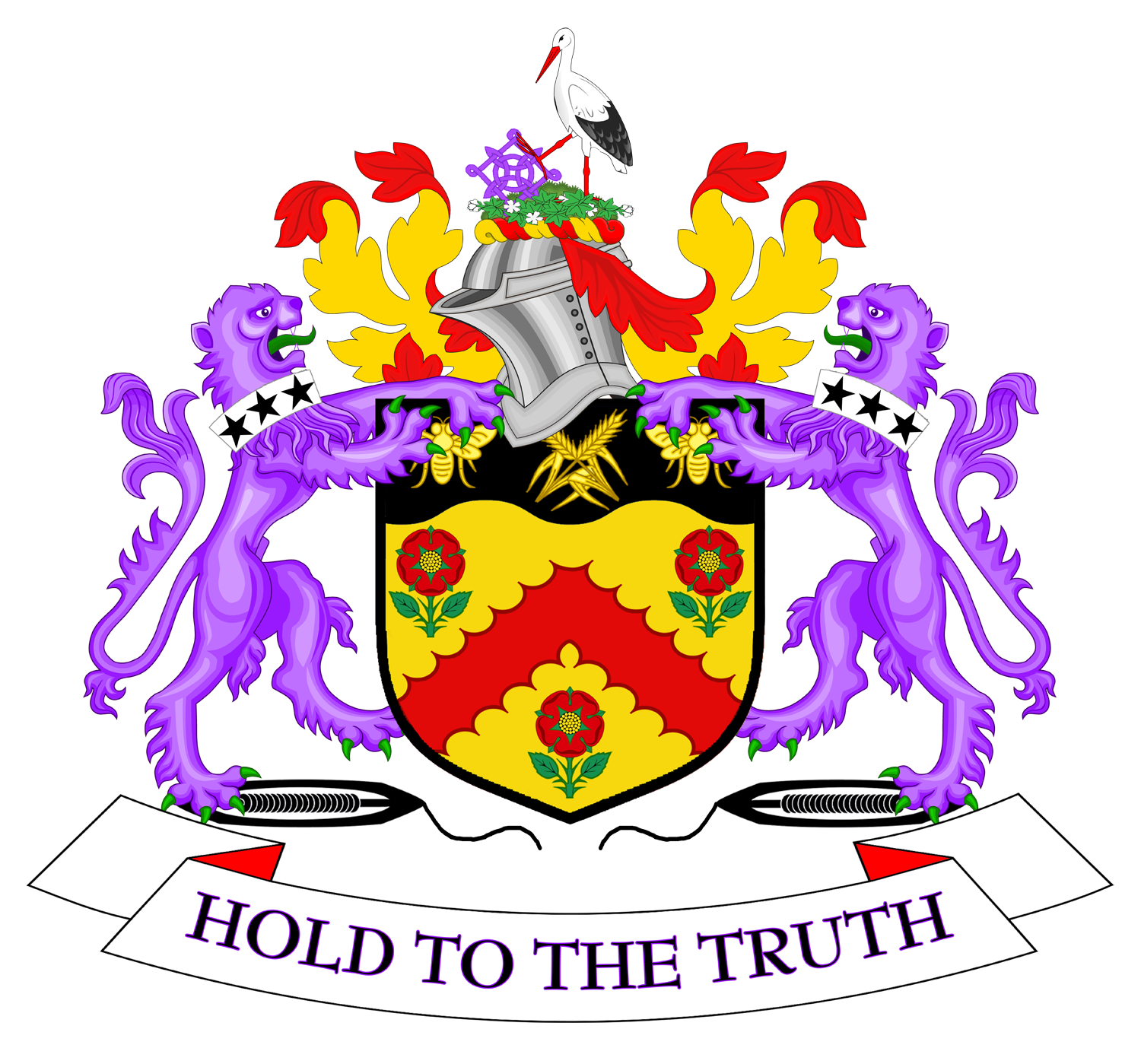
- 7 May 2026

15 out of 45 seats to Burnley Borough Council 23 seats needed for a majority
- Registered: 67,774
- Turnout: 26,491; 39.1%
	First party	Second party	Third party
Leader	Mark Townsend	Afrasiab Anwar	Jamie McGowan
Party	Labour	Independent	Conservative
Last election	15 seats, 32.4%	10 seats, 21.9%	8 seats, 26.3%
Seats before	13	11 (Note: The 11 Independent councillors sat in the Independent Group.)	7
Seats won	0	3	0
Seats after	10	10	4
	Fourth party	Fifth party	Sixth party
Leader	Howard Baker	Jack Launer	Alan Hosker
Party	Liberal Democrats	Green	Reform
Last election	7 seats, 9.2%	5 seats, 10.1%	Did not stand
Seats before	7	5	2
Seats won	1	0	11
Seats after	6	3	12
- Results by ward
Leader before election
Afrasiab Anwar
Independent
No overall control (Note: Independent–Liberal Democrat–Green coalition.)
Leader after election
Afrasiab Anwar
Independent
No overall control (Note: Independent–Liberal Democrat–Green coalition.)

The 2026 Burnley Borough Council election will take place on 7 May 2026 to elect members of Burnley Borough Council in Lancashire, England. This was on the same day as other local elections.

Prior to the election, the council was under no overall control. It was run by a coalition which called itself the "Co-operative Alliance", comprising the independent councillors, Liberal Democrats and Green Party, led by independent councillor Afrasiab Anwar.

The council remained under no overall control at this election. Reform UK won eleven of the fifteen seats being contested and became the largest individual party on the council. The coalition of the independent councillors, Liberal Democrats and Greens continued to run the council after the election, and the incumbent leader of the council, Afrasiab Anwar, was formally reappointed to the role at the subsequent annual council meeting on 20 May 2026.

== Summary ==
=== Council composition ===
After 2024 election		Before 2026 election	
Party	Seats	Party	Seats
Labour	15	Labour	13
Conservative	8	Conservative	7
Liberal Democrats	7	Liberal Democrats	7
Green	5	Green	5
Reform	0	Reform	2
Independent	10	Independent	11

Changes 2024–2026:

- February 2025: Charlie Briggs (Labour, elected as BAPIP) leaves party to sit as an independent
- June 2025: Alan Hosker (Conservative) leaves party to sit as an independent
- August 2025:
  - Fiona Wild (Labour) leaves party to sit as an independent
  - Alan Hosker (Independent) and Jeff Sumner (Liberal Democrats) join Reform
  - Charlie Briggs (Independent) joins Liberal Democrats
- September 2025: Fiona Wild (Independent) and Syeda Kazmi (Independent, elected as Labour) resign – by-elections held November 2025
- November 2025: Shiraz Ahmed (Independent) and Musharaf Parvez (Independent) gain by-elections from Labour

== Incumbents ==
Ward	Incumbent councillor	Party	Re-standing
Bank Hall	Afrasiab Anwar (Note: Originally elected as Labour, but left the party to sit as an independent.)	Independent	Yes
Briercliffe	Gordon Lishman	Liberal Democrats	No
Brunshaw	Christine Sollis	Independent	No
Cliviger with Worsthorne	Jack Launer	Green	Yes (Note: Standing in Brunshaw ward.)
Coalclough with Deerplay	Gordon Birtwistle	Liberal Democrats	Yes
Daneshouse with Stoneyholme	Shah Hussain	Independent	Yes
Gannow	Neil Mottershead (Note: Originally elected as Burnley & Padiham Independent Party (BAPIP); joined the Conservatives when BAPIP dissolved.)	Conservative	Yes
Gawthorpe	Alun Lewis	Labour	Yes
Hapton with Park	Jamie McGowan	Conservative	Yes
Lanehead	Sue Graham	Labour	Yes
Queensgate	Musharaf Parvez (Note: Elected at the 2025 Queensgate by-election.)	Independent	No
Rosegrove with Lowerhouse	Gail Barton	Labour	No
Rosehill with Burnley Wood	Jeff Sumner (Note: Originally elected as a Liberal Democrat, but later defected to Reform.)	Reform	Yes
Trinity	Alex Hall (Note: Elected at the 2023 Trinity by-election.)	Green	No
Whittlefield with Ightenhall	Mike Steel	Conservative	Yes

== Election result ==
Council composition after the 2024 election

Council composition after the 2026 election

2026 Burnley Borough Council election
Party	This election				Full council			This election		
Party	Candidates	Seats	Net	Seats %	Other	Total	Total %	Votes	Votes %	+/−
Reform	{{{candidates}}}	11	▲11	73.33	1	12	26.67	11,440	43.27	
Independent	{{{candidates}}}	3	▲3	20.00	7	10	22.22	3,575	13.52	
Liberal Democrats	{{{candidates}}}	1	▼2	6.67	5	6	13.33	3,126	11.83	
Labour	{{{candidates}}}	0	▼7	0.00	10	10	22.22	3,242	12.26	
Conservative	{{{candidates}}}	0	▼2	0.00	4	4	8.89	2,792	10.56	
Green	{{{candidates}}}	0	▼2	0.00	3	3	6.67	2,264	8.56	
BAPIP	{{{candidates}}}	0	▼1	0.00	0	0	0.00	0	0.00	

== Ward results ==
=== Bank Hall ===
Bank Hall
Party	Candidate	Votes	%	±%
Independent	Afrasiab Anwar*	906	56.2	
Reform	Trevor Williams	500	31.0	
Labour	Mohammed Ali	206	12.8	
Majority		406	25.2	
Rejected ballots		12		
Turnout		1,624	37.6	
Registered electors		4,316		
Independent gain from Labour		Swing		

=== Briercliffe ===
Briercliffe
Party	Candidate	Votes	%	±%
Reform	Mark Poulton	1,003	51.0	
Liberal Democrats	Pippa Lishman	788	40.1	
Labour	Pete Coles	122	6.2	
Conservative	Susan Nutter	54	2.7	
Majority		215	10.9	
Rejected ballots		4		
Turnout		1,971	45.8	
Registered electors		4,305		
Reform gain from Liberal Democrats		Swing		

=== Brunshaw ===
Brunshaw
Party	Candidate	Votes	%	±%
Reform	Josh Graham	901	57.4	
Green	Jack Launer*	306	19.5	
Labour	Millie Towers	257	16.4	
Conservative	Maison McGowan-Doe	107	6.8	
Majority		595	37.9	
Rejected ballots		4		
Turnout		1,575	34.9	
Registered electors		4,513		
Reform gain from Labour		Swing		

=== Cliviger with Worsthorne ===
Cliviger with Worsthorne
Party	Candidate	Votes	%	±%
Reform	Gavin Theaker	1,215	51.6	
Conservative	Simon Bonney	514	21.8	
Green	Affan Burki	263	11.2	
Liberal Democrats	Frank Bartram	187	7.9	
Labour	Gail Barton	176	7.5	
Majority		701	29.8	
Rejected ballots		5		
Turnout		2,361	52.6	
Registered electors		4,486		
Reform gain from Green		Swing		

=== Coalclough with Deerplay ===
Coalclough with Deerplay
Party	Candidate	Votes	%	±%
Liberal Democrats	Gordon Birtwistle*	751	44.6	
Reform	Tom Pickup	669	39.8	
Labour	Jeffrey Slee	161	9.6	
Conservative	Abbey Hartley	101	6.0	
Majority		82	4.8	
Rejected ballots		2		
Turnout		1,684	41.3	
Registered electors		4,082		
Liberal Democrats hold		Swing		

=== Daneshouse with Stoneyholme ===
Daneshouse with Stoneyholme
Party	Candidate	Votes	%	±%
Independent	Shah Hussain*	1,092	57.1	
Liberal Democrats	Muhammad Shahid Mahmood	564	29.5	
Labour	James Harrison	157	8.2	
Reform	Eddie Kutavicius	99	5.2	
Majority		528		
Rejected ballots		9		
Turnout		1,921	38.1	
Registered electors		5,045		
Independent gain from Labour		Swing		

=== Gannow ===
Gannow
Party	Candidate	Votes	%	±%
Reform	Angela Radcliffe	782	50.7	
Conservative	Neil Mottershead*	382	24.8	
Labour	Daniel Armitage	193	12.5	
Green	Alex Hall	186	12.1	
Majority		400	25.9	
Rejected ballots		3		
Turnout		1,546	34.0	
Registered electors		4,541		
Reform gain from BAPIP		Swing		

=== Gawthorpe ===
Gawthorpe
Party	Candidate	Votes	%	±%
Reform	Victoria Taylor	856	54.9	
Labour	Alun Lewis*	422	27.1	
Conservative	Rhys Williams	142	9.1	
Green	Edward Swift	139	8.9	
Majority		434	27.8	
Rejected ballots		3		
Turnout		1,562	35.9	
Registered electors		4,346		
Reform gain from Labour		Swing		

=== Hapton with Park ===
Hapton with Park
Party	Candidate	Votes	%	±%
Reform	Steve Keogh	883	46.0	
Conservative	Jamie McGowan*	659	34.4	
Labour	Elaine Cotterell	195	10.2	
Green	Sue Price	181	9.4	
Majority		224	31.6	
Rejected ballots		14		
Turnout		1,932	39.7	
Registered electors		4,867		
Reform gain from Conservative		Swing		

=== Lanehead ===
Lanehead
Party	Candidate	Votes	%	±%
Reform	James Halstead	681	32.1	
Independent	Raf Ali	513	24.2	
Liberal Democrats	Asif Raja	495	23.4	
Labour	Sue Graham*	285	13.4	
Green	Andrew Newhouse	145	6.8	
Majority		168	7.9	
Rejected ballots		15		
Turnout		2,134	45.1	
Registered electors		4,736		
Reform gain from Labour		Swing		

=== Queensgate ===
Queensgate
Party	Candidate	Votes	%	±%
Independent	Zulkernehn Hayat	936	54.9	
Reform	Felix Nowell	415	24.4	
Labour	Carol Lukey	239	14.0	
Liberal Democrats	Javad Mokhammad	114	6.7	
Majority		521	30.5	
Rejected ballots		11		
Turnout		1,715	37.5	
Registered electors		4,572		
Independent gain from Labour		Swing		

=== Rosegrove with Lowerhouse ===
Rosegrove with Lowerhouse
Party	Candidate	Votes	%	±%
Reform	Liam Thomson	907	56.9	
Labour	Daniel Tierney	302	18.9	
Green	Christopher Bridges	159	10.0	
Conservative	Kate Mottershead	146	9.2	
Liberal Democrats	Arthur Lishman	81	5.1	
Majority		605	38.0	
Rejected ballots		0		
Turnout		1,595	32.5	
Registered electors		4,907		
Reform gain from Labour		Swing		

=== Rosehill with Burnley Wood ===
Rosehill with Burnley Wood
Party	Candidate	Votes	%	±%
Reform	Jeff Sumner*	902	57.0	
Green	Fin Hewitt	242	15.3	
Labour	Laura Coles	189	11.9	
Liberal Democrats	Kathryn Haworth	146	9.2	
Conservative	Dale Ferrier	104	6.6	
Majority		660	41.7	
Rejected ballots		4		
Turnout		1,587	35.3	
Registered electors		4,495		
Reform gain from Liberal Democrats		Swing		

=== Trinity ===
Trinity
Party	Candidate	Votes	%	±%
Reform	Kev Shackell	610	51.3	
Green	Julie Hurt	428	36.0	
Labour	Dylan Rea	152	12.8	
Majority		182	15.3	
Rejected ballots		9		
Turnout		1,199	29.8	
Registered electors		4,028		
Reform gain from Green		Swing		

=== Whittlefield with Ightenhill ===
Whittlefield with Ightenhill
Party	Candidate	Votes	%	±%
Reform	Chris Weekes	1,017	47.8	
Conservative	Mike Steel*	583	27.4	
Green	Janet Hall	215	10.1	
Labour	Charlie Hindle	186	8.7	
Independent	Helen Heap	128	6.0	
Majority		434	20.4	
Rejected ballots		6		
Turnout		2,085	46.0	
Registered electors		4,535		
Reform gain from Conservative		Swing		
