= Molecular Biology of the Cell (book) =

1983 book by Bruce Alberts

- Cover of the first edition
- Authors: Bruce Alberts, Rebecca Heald, Julian Lewis, David Morgan, Martin Raff, Keith Roberts, Peter Walter
- Language: English
- Subject: Cell biology
- Publisher: W. W. Norton & Co.
- Publication date: 1983
- Publication place: United States
- Media type: Print
- Pages: 1464 pp (sixth edition)
- ISBN: 978-0-8153-4432-2 (hardcover), ISBN 978-0-8153-4524-4 (loose-leaf)
- Dewey Decimal: 571.6 22
- LC Class: QH581.2 .M64 2015

Molecular Biology of the Cell is a cellular and molecular biology textbook published by W.W. Norton & Co and currently authored by Bruce Alberts, Rebecca Heald, David Morgan, Martin Raff, Keith Roberts, and Peter Walter. The book was first published in 1983 by Garland Science and is now in its seventh edition. The molecular biologist James Watson and Dennis Bray contributed to the first three editions.

Molecular Biology of the Cell is widely used in introductory courses at the university level, being considered a reference in many libraries and laboratories around the world. It describes the current understanding of cell biology and includes basic biochemistry, experimental methods for investigating cells, the properties common to most eukaryotic cells, the expression and transmission of genetic information, the internal organization of cells, and the behavior of cells in multicellular organisms. Molecular Biology of the Cell has been described as "the most influential cell biology textbook of its time". The sixth edition is dedicated to the memory of co-author Julian Lewis, who died in early 2014.

The book was the first to position cell biology as a central discipline for biology and medicine, and immediately became a landmark textbook. It was written in intense collaborative sessions in which the authors lived together over periods of time, organized by editor Miranda Robertson, then-Biology Editor of Nature.
