= 2023 Burnley Borough Council election =

Election

← 2022	4 May 2023	2024 →

15 out of 45 seats to Burnley Borough Council 23 seats needed for a majority

	First party	Second party	Third party
Leader	Afrasiab Anwar	Alan Hosker	Scott Cunliffe
Party	Labour	Conservative	Green
Last election	18 seats, 38.9%	8 seats, 26.1%	6 seats, 16.6%
Seats before	19	6	6
Seats won	8	2	2
Seats after	21	7	7
Seat change	▲3	▼1	▲1
Popular vote	8,131	4,342	3,229
Percentage	42.2%	22.5%	16.7%
Swing	▲3.3%	▼3.6%	▲0.1%
	Fourth party	Fifth party	Sixth party
Leader	Gordon Birtwistle	Mark Payne
Party	Liberal Democrats	BAPIP	Independent
Last election	8 seats, 12.8%	5 seats, 5.4%	0 seats, 0.2%
Seats before	8	5 (Note: Including one vacant seat in Whittlefield and Ightenhill ward previously held by BAPIP councillor Emma Payne prior to her resignation in January 2023.)	1 (Note: Including one vacant seat in Hapton with Park ward previously held by Peter Gill, who was elected for UKIP in May 2019, changed to the Brexit Party in August 2019, joined the Conservatives in January 2020, left the party to sit as an independent in September 2022 and resigned his seat in April 2023 shortly before the election.)
Seats won	2	1	0
Seats after	7	3	0
Seat change	▼1	▼2	Steady
Popular vote	2,594	824	92
Percentage	13.5%	4.3%	0.5%
Swing	▲0.7%	▼1.1%	▲0.3%
- The winner of each seat in the 2023 Burnley Borough Council Election
Leader before election
Afrasiab Anwar
Labour
No overall control
Leader after election
Afrasiab Anwar
Labour
No overall control

The 2023 Burnley Borough Council election took place on 4 May 2023 to elect members of Burnley Borough Council in Lancashire, England. This was on the same day as other local elections.

== Summary ==
The council was under no overall control prior to the election, being run by a Labour and Liberal Democrat coalition, led by Labour councillor Afrasiab Anwar. The council remained under no overall control after the election; Labour gained seats but remained two seats short of an overall majority. A Labour minority administration formed after the election, with the Liberal Democrats withdrawing from the coalition.

=== Election result ===
2023 Burnley Borough Council election
Party	This election			Full council			This election		
Party	Seats	Net	Seats %	Other	Total	Total %	Votes	Votes %	+/−
Labour	8	▲2	53.3	13	21	46.7	8,131	42.2	+3.3
Conservative	2	▲1	13.3	5	7	15.6	4,342	22.5	–3.6
Green	2	▲1	13.3	5	7	15.6	3,229	16.7	+0.1
Liberal Democrats	2	▼1	13.3	5	7	15.6	2,594	13.5	+0.7
BAPIP	1	▼2	6.7	2	3	6.7	824	4.3	–1.1
Independent	0	Steady	0.0	0	0	0.0	92	0.5	+0.3
Heritage	0	Steady	0.0	0	0	0.0	66	0.3	N/A
UKIP	0	▼1	0.0	0	0	0.0	N/A	N/A	N/A

== Ward results ==
The Statement of Persons Nominated, which details the candidates standing in each ward, was released by Burnley Borough Council following the close of nominations on 5 April 2023. The results for each ward were as follows:

=== Bank Hall ===
Bank Hall
Party	Candidate	Votes	%	±%
Labour	Sehrish Lone*	927	74.1	–1.1
Conservative	Susan Nutter	130	10.4	–4.7
Green	Julie Hart	109	8.7	–1.0
Liberal Democrats	Khalil Pascall	85	6.8	N/A
Majority		797	63.7	+3.6
Turnout		1,251	30.3	–0.9
Registered electors		4,155		
Labour hold		Swing	▲1.8	

=== Briercliffe ===
Briercliffe
Party	Candidate	Votes	%	±%
Liberal Democrats	Anne Kelly*	614	49.6	–0.9
Labour	Pete Coles	356	28.7	+8.4
Conservative	Richard Sagar	219	17.7	–6.4
Green	Oliver Sanderson	50	4.0	–1.1
Majority		258	20.9	–5.5
Turnout		1,239	29.2	+0.5
Registered electors		4,259		
Liberal Democrats hold		Swing	▼4.7	

=== Brunshaw ===
Brunshaw
Party	Candidate	Votes	%	±%
Labour Co-op	Mark Townsend*	573	45.3	+3.4
Green	Alex Hall	514	40.7	+4.3
Conservative	Claire Ingham	177	14.0	–7.7
Majority		59	4.6	–0.9
Turnout		1,264	27.9	+0.9
Registered electors		4,554		
Labour Co-op hold		Swing	▼0.6	

=== Cliviger with Worsthorne ===
Cliviger with Worsthorne
Party	Candidate	Votes	%	±%
Green	Beki Hughes	799	44.1	–3.5
Conservative	Cosima Towneley*	760	42.0	–5.0
Labour	Peter Kenyon	151	8.3	+3.0
Liberal Democrats	John Hill	101	5.6	N/A
Majority		39	2.1	+1.5
Turnout		1,811	42.7	–1.5
Registered electors		4,253		
Green gain from Conservative		Swing	▲0.7	

=== Coal Clough with Deerplay ===
Coal Clough with Deerplay
Party	Candidate	Votes	%	±%
Liberal Democrats	Howard Baker*	563	47.0	–13.0
Labour	Mubashar Lone	274	22.9	+2.7
Conservative	Jackie Clarke	245	20.5	+4.7
Green	Janet Hall	115	9.6	+5.5
Majority		289	24.1	–15.7
Turnout		1,197	31.2	–5.1
Registered electors		3,853		
Liberal Democrats hold		Swing	▼7.9	

=== Daneshouse with Stoneyholme ===
Daneshouse with Stoneyholme
Party	Candidate	Votes	%	±%
Labour	Nussrat Kazmi	1,137	76.5	–10.4
Liberal Democrats	Mohammed Haji-Nazrul	244	16.4	+8.9
Conservative	Linda Whittaker	54	3.6	+0.3
Green	Sarah Hall	51	3.4	+1.0
Majority		893	60.1	–19.3
Turnout		1,486	31.9	–3.4
Registered electors		4,694		
Labour hold		Swing	▼9.7	

=== Gannow ===
Gannow
Party	Candidate	Votes	%	±%
BAPIP	Charlie Briggs*	486	48.3	+3.8
Labour Co-op	Gemma Haigh	371	36.8	+2.9
Conservative	Tom Watson	94	9.3	–3.5
Green	Jai Redman	56	5.6	–3.3
Majority		115	11.5	+0.9
Turnout		1,007	23.1	–3.4
Registered electors		4,356		
BAPIP hold		Swing	▲0.5	

=== Gawthorpe ===
Gawthorpe
Party	Candidate	Votes	%	±%
Labour	John Harbour*	783	65.4	+5.9
Conservative	Adam Brierley	335	28.0	–6.1
Green	Nigel Baldwin	79	6.6	+0.1
Majority		448	37.4	+12.0
Turnout		1,197	27.5	+0.3
Registered electors		4,397		
Labour hold		Swing	▲6.0	

=== Hapton with Park ===
Hapton with Park
Party	Candidate	Votes	%	±%
Conservative	Joanne Broughton	738	55.1	–11.9
Labour	Ashley Brown	481	35.9	+14.8
Green	Anna Hewitt	121	9.0	–2.9
Majority		257	19.2	–26.7
Turnout		1,340	28.2	–2.8
Registered electors		4,769		
Conservative gain from UKIP		Swing	▼13.4	

=== Lanehead ===
Lanehead
Party	Candidate	Votes	%	±%
Labour Co-op	Fiona Wild	655	50.5	–5.4
Conservative	Abdul Shahid	348	26.8	+2.6
Liberal Democrats	Pippa Lishman	217	16.7	+1.6
Green	Barbara Baldwin	77	5.9	+1.1
Majority		307	23.7	–8.0
Turnout		1,297	28.7	–0.1
Registered electors		4,528		
Labour Co-op hold		Swing	▼4.0	

=== Queensgate ===
Queensgate
Party	Candidate	Votes	%	±%
Labour	Mohammed Ishtiaq*	939	68.7	+0.7
Conservative	Bailey Webster	178	13.0	–10.3
Liberal Democrats	Christine Taylor	163	11.9	N/A
Green	Fiona Hornby	87	6.4	–2.4
Majority		761	55.7	+11.0
Turnout		1,367	32.8	+0.1
Registered electors		4,189		
Labour hold		Swing	▲5.5	

=== Rosegrove with Lowerhouse ===
Rosegrove with Lowerhouse
Party	Candidate	Votes	%	±%
Labour	Paul Reynolds	523	44.9	+3.5
BAPIP	Lorraine Mehanna*	338	29.0	+4.0
Conservative	Maison McGowan-Doe	170	14.6	–9.6
Liberal Democrats	Kathryn Haworth	72	6.2	+1.3
Green	Jane Curran	61	5.2	+0.7
Majority		185	15.9	–0.5
Turnout		1,164	23.7	–1.9
Registered electors		4,907		
Labour gain from BAPIP		Swing	▼0.3	

=== Rosehill with Burnley Wood ===
Rosehill with Burnley Wood
Party	Candidate	Votes	%	±%
Labour	Margaret Brindle	480	38.4	+14.8
Liberal Democrats	Russell Neal	468	37.4	–18.8
Conservative	Kev Shackell	168	13.4	–1.7
Green	Carol Fredlund	68	5.4	+0.3
Heritage	Catherine Ramsay	66	5.3	N/A
Majority		12	1.0	N/A
Turnout		1,250	28.3	–2.3
Registered electors		4,438		
Labour gain from Liberal Democrats		Swing	▲16.8	

=== Trinity ===
Trinity
Party	Candidate	Votes	%	±%
Green	Helen Bridges	552	64.0	–2.7
Labour	Shoaib Hashmi	233	27.0	+3.1
Conservative	Dale Ferrier	78	9.0	–0.3
Majority		319	37.0	–5.8
Turnout		863	21.9	–2.0
Registered electors		3,960		
Green hold		Swing	▼2.9	

=== Whittlefield with Ightenhill ===
Whittlefield with Ightenhill
Party	Candidate	Votes	%	±%
Conservative	Lee Ashworth	648	41.9	+3.6
Green	Andrew Newhouse	490	31.7	+3.7
Labour	Shaun Sproule	248	16.1	+1.2
Independent	Mitchell Cryer	92	6.0	+3.9
Liberal Democrats	Frank Bartram	67	4.3	N/A
Majority		158	10.2	–0.1
Turnout		1,545	34.1	–1.7
Registered electors		4,549		
Conservative gain from BAPIP		Swing	▼0.1	

== Changes between 2023–2024 ==
The Burnley and Padiham Independent Party was wound up in August 2023. Of that party's three councillors, Mark Payne and Neil Mottershead then sat as independents, while Charlie Briggs joined Labour.

=== By-elections ===
==== Trinity ====
Trinity: 26 October 2023
Party	Candidate	Votes	%	±%
Green	Alexander Hall	347	59.5	–4.5
Labour	Mubashar Lone	163	28.0	+1.0
Conservative	Susan Nutter	73	12.5	+3.5
Majority		184	31.5	
Turnout		588	15.1	
Registered electors		3,903		
Green hold		Swing	▼2.8	

The Trinity ward and Burnley Central West division by-elections were triggered by the resignation of Green councillor Andy Fewings.
