= Mirna Kvajo =

Croatian scientist and academic journal editor

Mirna Kvajo was a Croatian scientist and the chief editor of the academic journal BMC Biology. She died on May 16, 2023, in New York.

== Education ==
Kvajo has a bachelor's degree from the University of Zagreb and a Ph.D. from the Friedrich Miescher Institute for Biomedical Research and the University of Basel.

== Career ==
After graduating, Kvajo undertook postdoctoral research work at the Columbia University Irving Medical Center.

She was most recently the chief editor of the academic journal BMC Biology. She previously worked at Cell Press as an editor of the journal Cell. In 2019, she initiated a policy change at BMC Biology whereby the journal started sharing peer reviews of rejected articles with other academic journal editors.

=== Selected publications ===
- Kvajo, Mirna, et al. A mutation in mouse Disc1 that models a schizophrenia risk allele leads to specific alterations in neuronal architecture and cognition, Proceedings of the National Academy of Sciences 105.19 (2008): 7076–7081.
- Koike H, Arguello PA, Kvajo M, Karayiorgou M, Gogos JA. Disc1 is mutated in the 129S6/SvEv strain and modulates working memory in mice. Proceedings of the National Academy of Sciences. 2006 Mar 7;103(10):3693-7.
