= Martin Raff =

Canadian/British biologist and researcher

Martin Raff CBE FRS FMedSci MAE
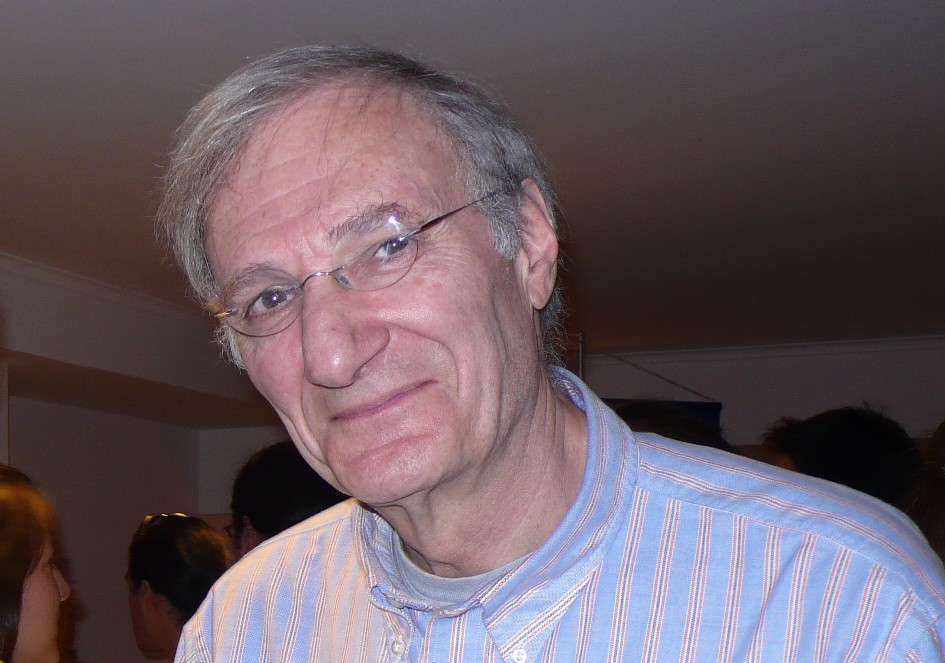
- Born: Martin Charles Raff; 15 January 1938 (age 88); Montreal, Canada
- Education: McGill University (BSc, MDCM)
- Known for: Molecular Biology of the Cell
- Children: Jordan Raff
- Awards: EMBO Member (1974); Member of the National Academy of Sciences (2003)
- Scientific career
- Fields: Immunology; Developmental neurobiology
- Workplaces: University College London
- Doctoral students: Charles ffrench-Constant; Ben Barres
- Website: www.ucl.ac.uk/lmcb/users/martin-raff

Martin Charles Raff CBE FRS FMedSci MAE (born 15 January 1938) is a Canadian/British biologist and researcher who is an Emeritus Professor at the MRC Laboratory for Molecular Cell Biology (LMCB) at University College London (UCL). His research has been in immunology, cell biology, and developmental neurobiology.

== Early life ==
Raff was born and educated in Montreal, where he obtained his Bachelor of Science degree in 1959 and an M.D.C.M. in 1963, both from McGill University.

== Career ==
Raff was an intern and assistant resident in medicine at the Royal Victoria Hospital, Montreal (1963–65) and a resident in neurology at the Massachusetts General Hospital in Boston (1965–68). He did postdoctoral research in immunology with Avrion Mitchison at the National Institute for Medical Research in Mill Hill, London (1968–1971), after which he moved to University College London, where he has been since 1971. He served as president of the British Society of Cell Biology (1991–95). He retired from active science in 2002, but he continued to serve on various scientific advisory boards in Europe and America until 2018. After his first retirement, when his grandson was diagnosed with autism, he became interested in the neurobiological basis of autism. He is co-author of two widely used cell biology textbooks: Molecular Biology of the Cell and Essential Cell Biology.

=== Awards and honours ===
Raff has received the following awards for his research:

- 1974: Nominated a member of the European Molecular Biology Organization (EMBO)
- 1985: Elected a Fellow of the Royal Society (FRS)
- 1988: Member of Academia Europaea (MAE)
- 1989: Feldberg Prize given by Feldberg Foundation
- 1989: Honorary Member of the American Neurological Society
- 1998: Inaugural Fellow of the Academy of Medical Sciences (FMedSci)
- 1999: Foreign Honorary Member of the American Academy of Arts and Sciences
- 2002: Hamdan Award for Medical Research Excellence - Apoptosis in Disease & Health, awarded by Sheikh Hamdan bin Rashid Al Maktoum Award for Medical Sciences, United Arab Emirates
- 2003: International Member of the National Academy of Sciences
- 2005: Honorary Degree, McGill University
- 2006: The Biochemical Society Award
- 2007: Honorary Degree, Vrije Universiteit Brussel
- 2010: DART/NYU Biotechnology Achievement Award in Basic Science

== Personal life ==
Raff's son Jordan Raff is also a scientist.
