= Garland Science =

Defunct American publishing company

- Parent company: Taylor & Francis
- Founded: 1968
- Founder: Gavin G. Borden
- Successor: W. W. Norton & Company
- Country of origin: United States
- Headquarters location: New York City
- Publication types: Textbooks
- Official website: www.garlandscience.com

Garland Science was a publishing group that specialized in developing textbooks in a wide range of life sciences subjects, including cell and molecular biology, immunology, protein chemistry, genetics, and bioinformatics. It was a subsidiary of the Taylor & Francis Group.

== History ==
The firm was founded as Garland Publishing in 1969 by Gavin Borden (1939–1991). Initially it published "18th-century literary criticism". By the late 1970s it was mainly publishing academic reference books along with facsimile and reprint editions for niche markets.

Notable book series published by Garland Publishing included the Garland Reference Library of the Humanities (1975–), the Garland Reference Library of Social Science (1983–), and Garland Medieval Bibliographies (1989–). The Garland Encyclopedia of World Music (10 volumes), originally published by Garland Publishing, is now published by Routledge, another imprint of the Taylor & Francis Group.

In 1984 the firm published a new edition of James Joyce's Ulysses, under the title of Ulysses: A Critical and Synoptic Edition. Edited by Hans Walter Gabler, it was intended to correct "almost 5,000 omissions, transpositions and other errors in the original text" as published in 1922.

In 1983 the firm began publishing scientific textbooks. In 1997 the firm was acquired by Taylor & Francis and published under the name of Garland Science Publishing or Garland Science.

One Garland Science success was the textbook Molecular Biology of the Cell (authors include Bruce Alberts and Peter Walter; James D. Watson was a previous author), which has been lauded as "the most influential cell biology textbook of its time". Other notable textbooks published by Garland Science included The Biology of Cancer (by Robert Weinberg), Immunobiology (authors including Charles Janeway and Kenneth Murphy), Molecular Biology of the Cell: The Problems Book (by John Wilson and Tim Hunt), Essential Cell Biology (Bruce Alberts et al.), The Immune System (Peter Parham), Molecular Driving Forces (Ken A. Dill & Sarina Bromberg), and Physical Biology of the Cell (Rob Phillips, Jane Kondev & Julie Theriot).

As of 2018, the Garland Science website had been shut down and their major textbooks have been sold to W. W. Norton & Company.
