= Frank McKeon =

American biologist

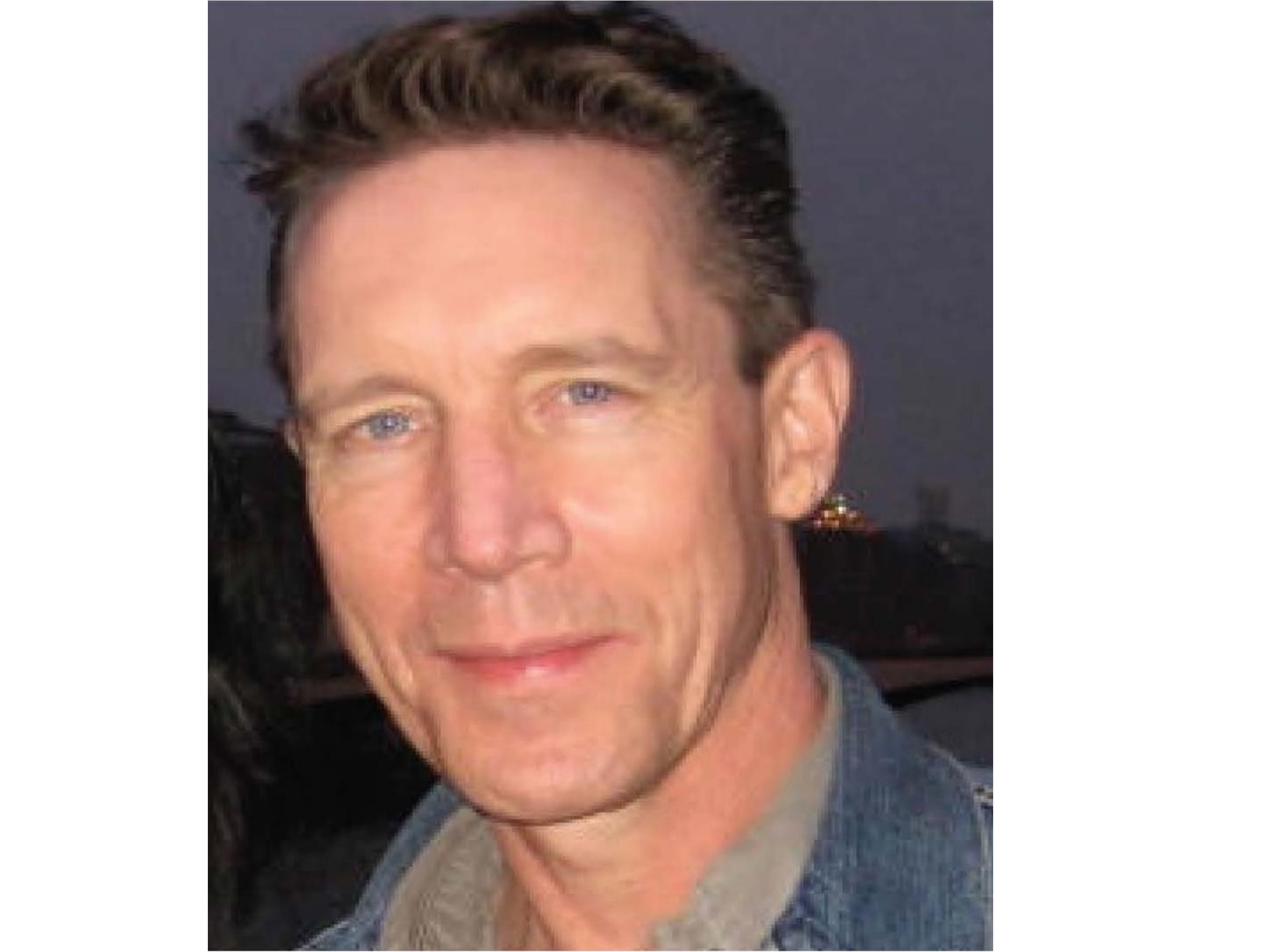
- Born: New Haven, Connecticut
- Education: Pomona College; University of California San Francisco
- Scientific career
- Fields: Stem cell biology
- Institutions: Wake Forest University School of Medicine; University of Houston; Genome Institute of Singapore; Harvard Medical School
- Doctoral advisor: Marc Kirschner

Frank McKeon is an American biologist, stem cell researcher and professor of Cancer Biology at Wake Forest University School of Medicine. He is known for his work on epithelial stem cells, cancer precursors, and regenerative medicine.

== Biography ==
He was born in New Haven, Connecticut. McKeon earned his BA in Biology from Pomona College in 1979 and his PhD in Biochemistry and Biophysics under Marc Kirschner from the University of California, San Francisco in 1984. He conducted postdoctoral training in Biochemistry and Biophysics at UCSF.

== Career ==
He joined Harvard Medical School in 1986 as an assistant professor in the Department of Physiology, later becoming an associate professor in 1991 and professor in the Department of Cell Biology in 1997, where he remained until 2012.

In 2008, he became Senior Group Leader at the Genome Institute of Singapore and Visiting Professor at the University of Strasbourg. From 2012 to 2015, McKeon was a professor at the Jackson Laboratory before moving to the University of Houston, where he directed the Somatic Stem Cell Center and served as a CPRIT Established Investigator. In 2025, he joined Wake Forest University as Professor of Cancer Biology and currently leads research in stem cell biology, cancer precursors, and regenerative medicine, while serving as Chief Scientific Officer at TractBio.

== Research Contributions ==
McKeon is known for his research on stem cells, cancer precursors, and regenerative medicine. His work has focused on understanding the cellular origins of disease and developing models of human stem cell biology.

At Harvard Medical School, McKeon was the first to clone the p63 and p73 genes , homologs of the tumor suppressor p53. Using a knockout mouse model, he demonstrated that p63 functions not as a tumor suppressor but as a master regulator of epithelial stem cells in stratified epithelia. He also developed monoclonal antibodies against p63, which are used in clinical diagnostics and are part of FDA-approved tests for prostate and breast cancer.

During his tenure at the Genome Institute of Singapore, McKeon, developed technology to clone normal and pathogenic epithelial stem cells. This work led to the identification of early markers for metaplasia in Barrett’s esophagus, a precursor to esophageal adenocarcinoma.

At the University of Houston, as director of the Somatic Stem Cell Center, McKeon’s team focused on cancer precursor lesions, including Barrett’s esophagus, esophageal adenocarcinoma (EAC), and intestinal gastric cancer (iGC). Using patient-matched stem cell clones, his research revealed that these cancers originate from identical precursor stem cells. By reconstructing the stepwise progression from precursors to malignancy, McKeon and Xian enabled high-resolution models for drug discovery and preventive therapies, targeting nascent lesions before they develop into advanced cancer.

McKeon has applied his stem cell researches to lung biology and chronic diseases. In collaboration with Wa Xian, he identified three abnormal variant lung stem cell populations that drive the pathology of Chronic Obstructive Pulmonary Disease (COPD), including mucus hypersecretion, fibrosis, and inflammation.
