= Con-Con Eleven =

Group of eleven women delegates to the 1961–1962 Michigan Constitutional Convention

The Con-Con Eleven were a group of eleven women delegates to the 1961-1962 Michigan Constitutional Convention, which produced the current Michigan Constitution. The group of eleven women (5 Democrats and six Republicans) were the first and only women to attend a Michigan Constitutional Convention. The eleven women were Vera Andrus (1896-1976), Ruth Gibson Butler (1891-1981), Anne M. Conklin (1925-1975), Katherine Moore Cushman (1916-1991), Ann Elizabeth Donnelly (1924-1984), Daisy Elizabeth Elliott (1919-2015), Adelaide Julia Hart (1900-1995), Lillian Hatcher (1915-1998), Dorothy Leonard Judd (1898-1989), Ella Demmink Koeze (1905-1986) and Marjorie Frances McGowan (1930-1980).

The eleven were appointed to 11 of the fourteen committees of the Constitutional convention, and three would serve as vice-chairs, though none were chairs. The delegates were from Port Huron, Houghton, Livonia, Dearborn, Highland Park, Detroit and Grand Rapids, Michigan.

== Background ==
Dorothy Leonard Judd was a civic leader and activist, born in 1898 in Grand Rapids, Michigan, where she grew up. Judd graduated from Grand Rapids Central High School and later Vassar College. She subsequently studied political science under James K. Pollock at University of Michigan. After graduating, Judd taught from 1921 to 1924 at the same high school she graduated from; during these years, she was also active politically, and involved in founding the League of Women Voters, the statewide branch of which she would lead in 1928. Four years later, Judd headed the league's Efficiency in Government committee, a role which she would serve in until 1934. From 1935-36, she worked in the Michigan State Civil Service Study Commission, and (28 years later) Judd sat on the Michigan State Civil Service Commission (of which she was a chairwomen for two years). Judd also was a founder of Citizens Action, a political action group that opposed George Welch and Frank McKay, local politicians. The group succeeded in having Welch resign from his position of mayor in 1950. In 1961, she was a delegate to the constitutional convention, working with the civil rights committee. After the convention, she was a chair of the Michigan State Advisory Committee to the United States Commission on Civil Rights for three years. In 1966, Judd finally retired from the League of Women Voters. Dorothy Judd died in February 1989.

Katherine Moore Cushman was born in 1916. She lived in Dearborn, Michigan, her whole life. Cushman graduated from Dearborn Public Schools and later gained an A.B. from University of Michigan in 1938. A longtime member of the League of Women Voters, she was twice a president of the Detroit League, and a president of the Michigan League. As an author, Cushman wrote Dearborn and Its Government, and contributed to several other works. She was a large promoter of the Constitutional convention, giving speeches, writing letters, and urging people to vote for the measure. Upon the calling of the convention, Cushman served on Local Government, and Style and Drafting Committees. She also promoted the ratification of the new constitution upon the drafting. Cushman also advocated against parochiaid. She was a member of Citizens to Advance Public Education and Christ Episcopal Church. Cushman married Edward L. Cushman, and died in 1991.

Vera Andrus was born in Reedsburg, Wisconsin, on August 21, 1896. She resided for much of her life in Port Huron, Michigan. A lifelong Republican, she served as a school teacher, and was later elected to be a delegate to the Michigan state constitutional convention. A Christian Scientist, as well as a member of the League of Women Voters, the American Association of University Women, the National Education Association, Phi Beta Kappa, and the American Historical Association, she died in August 1976.

Ruth Gibson Butler was born on July 11, 1891, in Republic, Michigan, and spent much of her life in Houghton, Michigan, where she graduated from the high school. She was a republican member of the Michigan Republican State Central Committee, from 1961 to 1962. She was a delegate to Michigan state constitutional convention those same years. She ran for the Michigan state house of representatives in 1962. In 1966, Butler was the first woman elected to the Houghton Village Council. She served on the Commission for the Equality of Women and was appointed by William Milliken as a delegate to the White House Conference on Problems of the Aging. She was a member of the League of Women Voters, and in the Order of the Eastern Star. Butler died in March, 1981.
