= BMC Biology =

- Discipline: Biology
- Language: English
- Edited by: Mirna Kvajo

Publication details
- History: 2003–present
- Publisher: BioMed Central (UK)
- Open access: Yes
- License: Creative Commons
- Impact factor: ▲7.431 (2020); ▲6.765 (2019); ▲6.723 (2018); ▼5.770 (2017)

Standard abbreviations
- ISO 4: BMC Biol.

Indexing
- ISSN: 1741-7007

Links
- Journal homepage

BMC Biology is an online open access scientific journal that publishes original, peer-reviewed research in all fields of biology, together with opinion and comment articles. The publication was established in 2003. The journal is part of a series of BMC journals published by the UK-based publisher BioMed Central, owned by Springer Nature. The journal has an international editorial board of researchers and editorial offices in London and New York.

Since 2010 it has incorporated what was previously the separate Journal of Biology.

Video abstracts associated with the BMC Biology articles are collected on the BMC YouTube Channel.

== Abstracting and Indexing ==
BMC Biology is indexed in PubMed, MEDLINE (added in 2005), BIOSIS Previews, Chemical Abstracts Service, EMBASE, Scopus, Zoological Record, CAB International, Institute for Scientific Information and Google Scholar.

The journal has a (2019) impact factor of 7.431.
