= Journal of Biology =

- Discipline: Biology
- Language: English

Publication details
- History: 2002-2010
- Publisher: BioMed Central
- Open access: Hybrid

Standard abbreviations
- ISO 4: J. Biol.

Indexing
- CODEN: JBOIAW
- ISSN: 1478-5854 (print); 1475-4924 (web)
- LCCN: 2002248523
- OCLC no.: 741465271

Links
- Journal homepage

The Journal of Biology was a peer-reviewed scientific journal published by BioMed Central. It was established in 2002 with the aim to provide an alternative to biology journals with high-impact factor such as Nature, Science, and Cell. Because of stringent selection criteria, it published only a few research articles per year, only four in 2007, for example, with the rest being comment and short review articles. The research articles were published as open access and many of these research articles were highly cited.

The journal was never indexed by the Science Citation Index and therefore didn't get an official impact factor. According to an unofficial calculation in 2007, it reached an impact factor of 20.1. The journal was discontinued in April 2010 and merged with the existing journal BMC Biology.
