= Julian Lewis (biologist) =

English developmental biologist

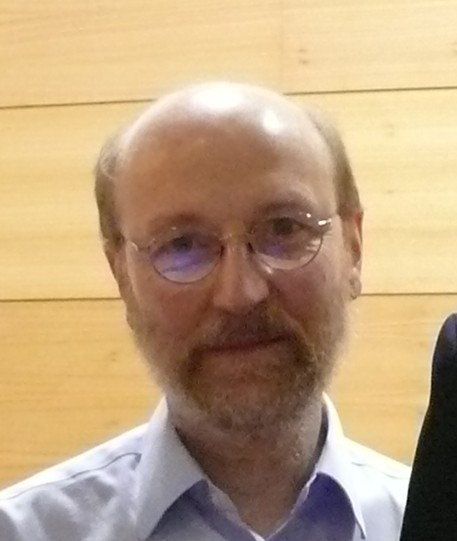
- in 2008
- Born: 12 August 1946
- Died: 30 April 2014 (aged 67)
- Education: Balliol College; University of Oxford
- Known for: Cellular timing research; Notch signalling research; Animal development research
- Scientific career
- Workplaces: Cancer Research UK

Julian Hart Lewis FRS (12 August 1946 – 30 April 2014) was an English developmental biologist and researcher whose work shed light on the nature of cellular timing mechanisms and their role in animal development. He showed that the Notch ligand (a molecule involved in cell-to-cell communication) controls the timing of nerve cell differentiation and the synchronised cycling of neighbouring cell activity. He modelled the cellular oscillatory circuit that determines the segmentation of the developing body, and clarified the importance of delay kinetics in setting the frequency of those oscillations.

He was an undergraduate at Balliol College, Oxford, from 1964. He was elected a member of the European Molecular Biology Organization in 2005. The British Society for Developmental Biology awarded him the Waddington Medal in 2003. He became a Fellow of the Royal Society in 2012.

As well as leading a research team at Cancer Research UK's London Research Institute, he was co-author of Molecular Biology of The Cell, Alberts et al., and Essential Cell Biology, Alberts et al., popular biology textbooks.

He died in April 2014 after living with prostate cancer for a decade.
