= Peter Walter =

German-American molecular biologist and biochemist

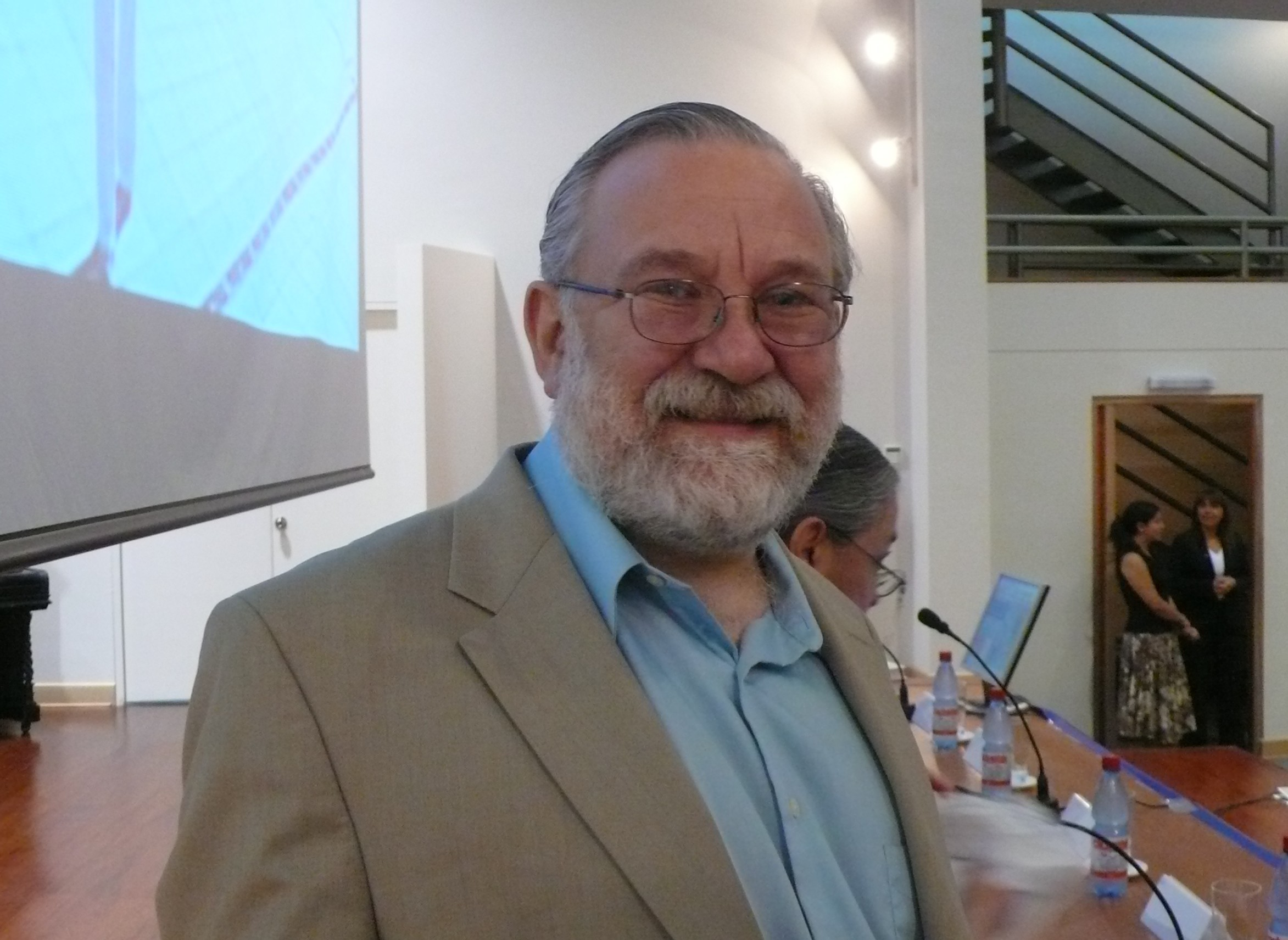
- Walter in 2021
- Born: December 5, 1954 (age 71); West Berlin
- Education: Free University of Berlin (Vordiplom); Vanderbilt University (MS); Rockefeller University (PhD)
- Known for: Signal recognition particle Unfolded protein response
- Awards: Eli Lilly Award in Biological Chemistry; Wiley Prize in Biomedical Science; Gairdner Foundation International Award; E.B. Wilson Medal; Otto Warburg Medal; Paul Ehrlich and Ludwig Darmstaedter Prize; Ernst Jung Prize; Mendel Lectures; Shaw Prize in Life Science and Medicine; Albert Lasker Award for Basic Medical Research; Breakthrough Prize in Life Sciences
- Scientific career
- Fields: Molecular biology Biochemistry
- Workplaces: Buck Institute for Research on Aging; Rockefeller University; University of California, San Francisco; Howard Hughes Medical Institute
- Thesis: Purification and characterization of an 11S protein complex required for the translocation of secretory proteins across the membrane of the endoplasmic reticulum (1981)
- Doctoral advisor: Günter Blobel

Peter Walter (born December 5, 1954) is a German-American molecular biologist and biochemist. He is currently a professor and the director of the Cell Health Initiative at the Buck Institute for Research on Aging and an emeritus professor at the Department of Biochemistry and Biophysics of the University of California, San Francisco (UCSF). He was a Howard Hughes Medical Institute (HHMI) Investigator until 2022.

== Early life and education ==
Walter was born and raised in West Berlin in 1954. His parents owned a pharmacy, and he was drawn to chemistry at a young age. He entered the Free University of Berlin in 1973 to study chemistry, but the rigid way of teaching science did not engage him. Instead, Walter became interested in biochemistry, which studies the chemistry of cells.

In the last year of his Vordiplom (equivalent to a BSc) in 1976, he went on exchange to Vanderbilt University and conducted research under Thomas M. Harris at the Department of Chemistry on the biosynthetic pathway of slaframine, a fungal alkaloid that is toxic to cows. Eventually, Walter completed his M.S. at Vanderbilt in 1977.

At the encouragement of Stanford Moore, a biochemistry professor at Rockefeller University and a trustee of Vanderbilt, Walter applied for the PhD programme at Rockefeller. He was placed on the waiting list, but after an accepted student went to Harvard University instead, was offered his place in 1977. He took his PhD under Günter Blobel, and obtained the degree in 1981.

== Career ==
After receiving his PhD, Walter stayed at Rockefeller University as a postdoctoral fellow for a year, then became an assistant professor at the Laboratory of Cell Biology at Rockefeller.

In 1983, he moved to the Department of Biochemistry and Biophysics of the University of California, San Francisco (UCSF) as an assistant professor. Walter was promoted to associate professor in 1986 and then full professor in five years later. He was chair of the Department of Biochemistry and Biophysics of UCSF between 2001 and 2008.

Walter became a Howard Hughes Medical Institute investigator in 1997, and served as the president of the American Society for Cell Biology in 2016.

In 2021, there were reports that he would be joining Altos Labs, a new biotechnology company which reportedly focuses on anti-aging research. The next year, he retired from UCSF and the Howard Hughes Medical Institute in 2022, and joined Altos Labs as the Director of the Bay Area Institute of Science when the company officially launched.

In 2026, Walter left Altos Labs and joined the Buck Institute for Research on Aging as a professor and director of the Cell Health Initiative. Walter currently sits on the Scientific Advisory Board of the Zentrum für Molekulare Biologie der Universität Heidelberg of Heidelberg University.

Walter is a coauthor of the widely used textbook Molecular Biology of the Cell.

== Research ==
During his PhD at Günter Blobel's group, Walter purified a protein complex required for moving proteins out of the endoplasmic reticulum (ER) and showed the complex selectively recognizes newly synthesized secretory proteins. He later confirmed the complex is in fact a nucleoprotein and identified the RNA component essential for the complex's function. He also named the complex signal recognition particle (SRP).

By the time Walter joined the University of California, San Francisco (UCSF), researchers have established a connection between misfolded proteins in the ER and increased expression of a protein called BiP, which is a chaperone protein that helps other proteins fold correctly. This pathway is termed the unfolded protein response (UPR). However, how cells sense misfolded proteins and relays this information to the cell nucleus to increase the production of UPR-target proteins remains unclear.

In 1993, working on baker's yeast, Walter found a gene, IRE1, which encodes a kinase. The IRE1 protein is located across the ER membrane, so a part of it can detect unfolded proteins inside the ER and the other part can phosphorylate proteins outside of the ER. The same year, Kazutoshi Mori, at the time a postdoctoral fellow at the University of Texas Southwestern Medical Center, independently made the same discovery.

Walter and Mori next independently sought the phosphorylation target of the IRE1 protein. Theoretically, upon phosphorylation, this target will enter the cell nucleus and increase the production of UPR-target proteins. Both of them arrived at the same gene, HAC1, in 1996. This discovery, however, was unexpected as the HAC1 protein is produced only after IRE1 detects unfolded proteins, meaning the protein is not present to be phosphorylated by IRE1.

This difference was mitigated by the finding of Mori and Walter that after IRE1 senses unfolded proteins, it splices the HAC1 precursor mRNA, which is transcribed from the HAC1 gene, resulting in a mature mRNA that is translated into the HAC1 protein. Walter also discovered the phosphorylation target of IRE1, which turned out to be another IRE1 molecule, a process known as trans-autophosphorylation, and also the enzyme stitching the spliced precursor HAC1 mRNA together.

In 2013, Walter's group identified a molecule that inhibits the integrated stress response (ISR). The ISR is the cell's response to stresses such as viral infection, ultraviolet light and the accumulation of unfolded and misfolded proteins. ISR activates the EIF2α protein, reducing most protein synthesis and increasing the production of some regulatory molecules. His group found the inhibitor reversed EIF2α activation, and named it ISRIB for "integrated stress response inhibitor". Remarkably, they found mice injected with ISRIB had improved memory. ISRIB was licensed to Alphabet subsidiary Calico in 2015.

== Awards and honors ==
- 1983 - Searle Scholar
- 1988 - Eli Lilly Award in Biological Chemistry
- 1989 - Sloan Research Fellowship
- 2002 - Member of the American Academy of Arts and Sciences
- 2004 - Member of the National Academy of Sciences
- 2004 - Associate Member of the European Molecular Biology Organization
- 2005 - Wiley Prize in Biomedical Science
- 2006 - Member of the German National Academy of Sciences Leopoldina
- 2009 - Gairdner Foundation International Award
- 2009 - E.B. Wilson Medal
- 2011 - Otto Warburg Medal
- 2012 - Paul Ehrlich and Ludwig Darmstaedter Prize
- 2012 - Ernst Jung Prize
- 2013 - Mendel Lectures
- 2014 - Shaw Prize in Life Science and Medicine
- 2014 - Albert Lasker Award for Basic Medical Research
- 2015 - Vilcek Prize in Biomedical Science
- 2017 - Fellow of the National Academy of Inventors
- 2018 - Member of the National Academy of Medicine
- 2018 - Breakthrough Prize in Life Sciences
- 2023 - BBVA Foundation Frontiers of Knowledge Award

== Personal life ==
Walter is married to Patricia Caldera-Muñoz, whom he met in New York City during his PhD years at Rockefeller University and when Caldera-Muñoz was a chemistry PhD student at New York University. Before retiring, Caldera-Muñoz worked at the University of California, San Francisco (UCSF) Science and Health Education Partnership, where she coordinated outreach to local science teachers.

Walter was diagnosed with neck cancer in 2009.
