= Bruce Alberts =

American biochemist (born 1938)

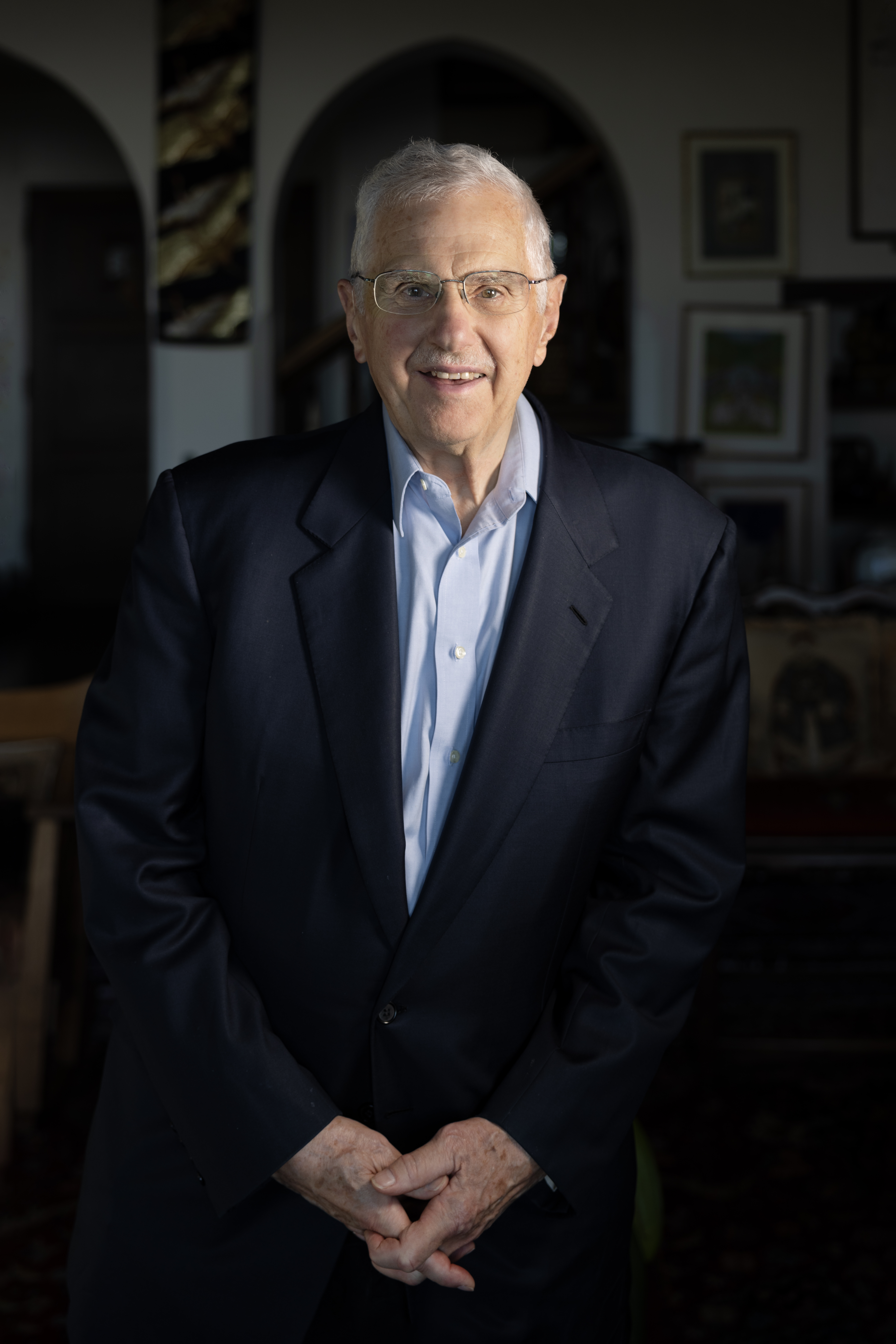
- Bruce Alberts in 2023

20th President of the National Academy of Sciences
- In office 1993–2005
- Preceded by: Frank Press
- Succeeded by: Ralph J. Cicerone

Personal details
- Born: Bruce Michael Alberts; April 14, 1938 (age 88) Chicago, Illinois, U.S
- Spouse: Betty Neary Alberts
- Website: brucealberts.ucsf.edu
- Scientific career
- Education: Harvard College (BSc 1960); Harvard University (PhD 1965)
- Known for: Molecular Biology of the Cell
- Awards: NAS Award in Molecular Biology (1975); Commander of the Order of the British Empire (2005); Vannevar Bush Award (2010); National Medal of Science (2014); Lasker-Koshland Special Achievement Award in Medical Science (2016); Sigma Xi Gold Key Award (2022)
- Fields: Biochemistry; Biophysics; Cell biology
- Workplaces: Princeton University; University of California, San Francisco
- Thesis: Characterization of Naturally Occurring, Cross-Linked Fraction of Deoxyribonucleic Acid (1966)
- Doctoral advisor: Paul Doty

External videos
- Bruce Alberts, "Learning from failure", iBioMagazine
- Bruce Alberts, “DNA Replication”, iBioMagazine
- Bruce Alberts, ”Redefining Science Education”, Distinctive Voices

Bruce Michael Alberts (born April 14, 1938, in Chicago, Illinois) is an American biochemist and the Emeritus Chancellor's Leadership Chair in Biochemistry and Biophysics for Science and Education at the University of California, San Francisco. He has done important work studying the protein complexes which enable chromosome replication when living cells divide. He is known as an original author of the "canonical, influential, and best-selling scientific textbook" Molecular Biology of the Cell, and served as Editor-in-Chief of Science magazine. He was awarded the National Medal of Science for "intellectual leadership and experimental innovation in the field of DNA replication, and for unparalleled dedication to improving science education and promoting science-based public policy" in 2014.

Alberts was the president of the National Academy of Sciences from 1993 to 2005. He is known for his work in forming science public policy, and has served as United States Science Envoy to Pakistan and Indonesia. He has stated that "Science education should be about learning to think and solve problems like a scientist—insisting, for all citizens, that statements be evaluated using evidence and logic the way scientists evaluate statements." He is an Honorary Fellow of St Edmund's College, Cambridge.

== Education ==
After graduating from New Trier High School in Winnetka, Illinois, Alberts attended Harvard College, as a pre-medicine major. Bored by assigned laboratory "cooking classes", he petitioned to skip the physical chemistry laboratory requirement and instead was allowed to work with his tutor Jacques Fresco, in Paul M. Doty's laboratory. The summer's research led to the publication of two successful papers on mismatch errors in the helical structures of DNA and RNA, and Alberts decided to continue on in biophysics. He graduated with his bachelor's degree in biochemical sciences, summa cum laude, in 1960.

Alberts then worked with Paul M. Doty on "enormously ambitious" PhD thesis projects, first attempting to solve the genetic code using nearest neighbor analysis after treatment of DNA with various mutagens, and then trying to test his theoretical model for how DNA polymerase could replicate a double-helical DNA template. After failing his first oral examination in spring 1965, he completed his Ph.D. research in fall 1965. His doctorate in biophysics was finally awarded by Harvard University in 1966. Alberts credits his initial failure with teaching him much more than his successes. "That was a very important learning experience for me. I had decided that experimental strategy was everything in science, and nobody had ever told me anything about this."

== Career ==
After graduating, Alberts went to the Institut de Biologie Moléculaire at the University of Geneva as a postdoctoral fellow, and worked with Richard H. Epstein on genes involved in DNA replication of phage T4. Epstein and his students had shown that there were at least seven different proteins needed for replication of T4 DNA. Alberts decided to do something that no one else was doing, and developed a DNA column for the purification of proteins that bound to DNA. This enabled him to purify the T4 Bacteriophage Gene 32 protein, thus identifying the first single-stranded DNA binding protein – a type of protein now known to be present in all cells.

In 1966, Alberts joined the department of biochemical sciences at Princeton University as an assistant professor. In 1971, he became an associate professor and in 1973 a full professor, holding the Damon Pfeiffer Professorship in life sciences from 1975 to 1976. At Princeton, he continued to work in the area of protein biochemistry, eventually reconstituting a DNA replication system in a test tube from seven purified proteins.

In 1976, Alberts accepted a position as professor and vice-chair of the department of biochemistry and biophysics at the University of California, San Francisco. Also in 1976, he and his students were able to add all seven proteins to double-stranded DNA in an appropriate magnesium concentration to make DNA. More years of research were spent understanding the details of the reactions involved in the 7-protein “machine” that replicated DNA. Another important step in understanding DNA synthesis was the discovery that the leading strand DNA polymerase and lagging strand DNA polymerase were coupled.

Alberts was elected a Fellow of the American Academy of Arts and Sciences in 1978. From 1981 to 1985 Alberts held an American Cancer Society Research Professorship, a title granted for life as of 1980. From 1985 to 1990, he was chair of the department of biochemistry and biophysics at the University of California, San Francisco, and from 1990 to 1993 he again held an American Cancer Society Research Professorship.

=== Science and education ===
Alberts served as the full-time President of the National Academy of Sciences for two terms, moving to Washington, D.C. from 1993 until 2005.

Alberts has long been committed to the improvement of science education, dedicating much of his time to educational projects such as City Science, a program seeking to improve science teaching in San Francisco elementary schools. He has served on the advisory board of the National Science Resources Center, a joint project of the National Academy of Sciences and the Smithsonian Institution working with teachers, scientists, and school systems to improve the teaching of science as well as on the National Academy of Sciences' National Committee on Science Education Standards and Assessment. When he was Academy president, the National Academies published more than a hundred reports on education, including the National Science Education Standards (NSES; NRC, 1996) and Inquiry and the National Science Education Standards (NRC, 2000), both intended to change the way that science is taught K-12. From 2005 to 2024, he served as Board Chair for the Strategic Education Research Partnership (SERP), a non-profit focused on carrying out use-inspired education research, established according to recommendations in the 2003 report from the National Academies.

The Bruce Alberts Award for Excellence in Science Education is given in his name by the American Society for Cell Biology to those who have made outstanding contributions in science education.

He has served in different capacities on a number of advisory and editorial boards, including as chair of the Commission on Life Sciences, National Research Council. Prior to his election as president of the National Academy of Sciences in 1995 he was president-elect of the American Society for Biochemistry and Molecular Biology. From 2007 to 2008 he served as president of the American Society for Cell Biology.

He served as a trustee of the Carnegie Corporation of New York from 2000 to 2009, and as a trustee of the Gordon and Betty Moore Foundation from 2005 to 2021. He and others have critiqued the biomedical research system, pointing out what they consider "systemic flaws" and have created the Rescuing Biomedical Research organization, to "collect and organize input for solutions" to the problems identified by themselves and others.

Alberts was editor-in-chief of the American Association for the Advancement of Science's flagship publication, Science for five years from 2008 to 2013. He is one of the founding editors of the journal Cell Biology Education.

Since 2013, Alberts has been listed on the Advisory Council of the National Center for Science Education.

=== International work ===
From 2000 to 2009, Alberts was the co-chair of the InterAcademy Council, an advisory institution in Amsterdam governed by the presidents of fifteen science academies from around the world. This organization has since been renamed the InterAcademy Panel for Policy, and it is now located in Trieste.

In his June 4, 2009, speech at Cairo University, US President Barack Obama announced a new Science Envoy program as part of a "new beginning between the United States and Muslims around the world." In January 2010, Bruce Alberts, Ahmed Zewail, and Elias Zerhouni became the first US science envoys to Islam, visiting Muslim-majority countries from North Africa to Southeast Asia.

== Publications ==
Alberts has had a productive research career in the field of DNA replication and cell division. His textbook, Molecular Biology of the Cell, now in its seventh edition, is the standard cell biology textbook in most universities; the fourth edition is freely available from National Center for Biotechnology Information Bookshelf. This book and its counterpart for undergraduate students, Essential Cell Biology, have been translated into multiple languages.

== Awards and honours ==
Alberts is a member of the American Academy of Arts and Sciences, the National Academy of Sciences, and the American Philosophical Society. In 2014, Alberts was awarded the National Medal of Science by President Barack Obama.

Alberts has received many awards and honours, including the following:

- 1975, NAS Award in Molecular Biology, "For the isolation of proteins required for DNA replication and genetic recombination and the elucidation of how they interact with DNA."
- 1997, Outstanding Educator Award, from The Exploratorium in San Francisco
- 2005, Commander of the Order of the British Empire
- 2005, Viktor Hamburger Outstanding Educator Prize, Society for Developmental Biology
- 2010, Vannevar Bush Award
- 2010, George Brown Award for International Scientific Cooperation
- 2014, National Medal of Science
- 2014, Centennial Medal, Harvard University
- 2016, Lasker-Koshland Special Achievement Award in Medical Science
- 2022, Sigma Xi Gold Key Award

Professional and academic associations
Preceded by Frank Press	President of the National Academy of Sciences; 1993 – 2005	Succeeded by Ralph J. Cicerone
Preceded by Mary Beckerle	ASCB President; 2007	Succeeded by Robert D. Goldman
Preceded by Donald Kennedy	Editor-in-chief of Science; 2008–2013	Succeeded by Marcia McNutt
