= 1823 Michigan Territorial Council election =

- September 4, 1823

18 candidates, from which 9 members to be chosen by the president of the United States

The 1823 Michigan Territorial Council election was held in the Territory of Michigan to elect the members of the territory's newly-formed legislative council.

== Background ==
Since its creation from part of Indiana Territory in 1805, the government of Michigan Territory had consisted of a governor, a secretary, and three judges; the governor and judges together formed the legislative branch of government. This was the first stage of territorial government outlined in the Northwest Ordinance. An election called by Governor Cass in 1818 to decide whether to move to the second stage of government—an elected legislature—failed largely due to concerns over the cost that would be borne by the territory. Public discontent with the first stage government continued to mount, until in 1822 hundreds of residents petitioned Congress for reform.

An act of Congress on March 3, 1823, created a four-year term for the judges and transferred the powers of the territory to the governor and a legislative council of nine people serving terms of two years. Members of the council were to be appointed by the president of the United States, with the advice and consent of the Senate, from a slate of 18 people chosen in a general election.

== Election ==
The Act of March 3, 1823, specified that the 18 people should be chosen by the qualified electors of the territory at the next election of its delegate to Congress, following the same rules as that election. The date of that election had been set as the first Thursday in September of every odd-numbered year by a May 20, 1819, act of the governor and judges of the territory. The elections were to be held at the "seat of justice" in each county in the territory. The next election following the Act of March 3, 1823, was on September 4, 1823.

Election results (top 18 of 123 vote-earners)
| Rank | Candidate | County of Residence | Votes by County | | | | | | | | Total Votes |
| Rank | Candidate | County of Residence | Brown | Crawford | Mackinac | Macomb | Monroe | Oakland | St. Clair | Wayne | Total Votes |
|---|---|---|---|---|---|---|---|---|---|---|---|
| 1 | Abraham Edwards | Wayne | 80 | 82 | | 103 | 288 | 152 | 76 | 404 | 1185 |
| 2 | Stephen Mack | Oakland | 80 | 82 | | 109 | 285 | 173 | 66 | 372 | 1167 |
| 3 | William H. Puthuff | Mackinac | 75 | 82 | 138 | 70 | 106 | 156 | 78 | 364 | 1069 |
| 4 | Wolcott Lawrence | Monroe | | 82 | | 27 | 282 | 111 | 44 | 410 | 956 |
| 5 | John Stockton | Brown | | 82 | | 63 | 273 | 81 | 59 | 268 | 826 |
| 6 | Roger Sprague | Macomb | | | | 99 | 252 | 138 | 35 | 283 | 807 |
| 7 | Robert Irwin Jr. | Oakland | 31 | 82 | 1 | 103 | 88 | 173 | 71 | 354 | 903 |
| 8 | Zephaniah W. Bunce | St. Clair | 53 | 82 | | 67 | 265 | 50 | 58 | 186 | 741 |
| 9 | Hubert Lacroix | Monroe | 52 | | | 81 | 127 | 80 | 36 | 335 | 711 |
| 10 | Joseph Miller | Macomb | | | | 57 | 87 | 106 | 117 | 328 | 625 |
| 11 | Solomon Sibley | Wayne | 30 | | | 27 | 75 | 156 | 60 | 202 | 610 |
| 12 | William Brown | Wayne | | | | 59 | 190 | 20 | 7 | 311 | 587 |
| 13 | Ebenezer Reed | Wayne | 7 | 82 | | 19 | 188 | 39 | 23 | 215 | 573 |
| 14 | Louis Baufet | Wayne | 45 | | | 56 | 192 | | 33 | 246 | 572 |
| 15 | Francois Navarre | Monroe | 56 | | | 55 | 195 | 1 | 17 | 232 | 556 |
| 17 | Benjamin F. Stickney | Monroe | | | | 28 | 89 | 129 | 39 | 265 | 550 |
| 16 | Laurent Durocher | Monroe | | | | 34 | 202 | 11 | 24 | 278 | 549 |
| 18 | Harry Conant | Monroe | | | | 26 | 85 | 110 | 38 | 244 | 503 |
| | Totals (all 123 vote-earners) | | 1024 | 1476 | 140 | 1934 | 5022 | 3014 | 1391 | 10034 | |

Territorial Governor Lewis Cass submitted the 18 names to John Quincy Adams, then the U.S. secretary of state, on October 30, 1823. Cass also included the vote totals and county of residence, saying, "So far as the President in the selection may think fit to be guided by the wish of the people, as expressed by their votes, or by an apportionment of the representatives among the different parts of the Territory, these data may be important".

In a letter to General Alexander Macomb in November 1823, Cass asked Macomb to meet with the secretary of state to express his desire that the top nine vote-earners be appointed. Cass feared that if that anyone else were appointed, he would be accused of having influenced the decision, a charge which he felt would be "seriously injurious". Macomb had a conversation with Adams about it on November 20 and forwarded Cass's letter to him the following day.

President James Monroe issued a commission on February 4, 1824, appointing the top nine vote-earners to the council, as Cass had suggested. On April 15, Governor Cass issued a proclamation calling for the first Legislative Council of the Territory of Michigan to convene in Detroit on June 1, 1824.
