= 1825 Michigan Territorial Council election =

- May 31, 1825; June 30, 1825

26 nominees, from which 13 members to be chosen by the president of the United States

The 1825 Michigan Territorial Council election was held in the Territory of Michigan to elect the members of the territory's legislative council.

== Background ==
The First Michigan Territorial Council had nine members, selected by the president of the United States from a slate of 18 people chosen in a general election. The council wrote a memorial to Congress complaining that "much inconvenience is experienced from the small number that forms" the council and that "the duties imposed on the present members are extremely arduous". They asked for an increase in size to 13, the same as the legislative council for Florida Territory. Congress expanded the size to 13 in an act of February 5, 1825, to be selected by the president from a slate of 26 people chosen in a general election.

== Election ==
In an act of April 13, 1825, the legislative council divided the territory into six districts and apportioned the 13 seats among them. It also set the date for the election of the next council as the "last Tuesday of May next, ... and thereafter ... biennially". The date for the election in the sixth district, comprising the more remote counties of Brown, Crawford, and Michilimackinac was set as "the last Thursday of June next". The election was thus held on May 31, 1825, for districts one through five, and on June 30, 1825, for the sixth district.

When certifying the results, the canvassers, William Woodbridge, the territory's secretary, and Robert Abbott, its treasurer, expressed uncertainty over how the results should be interpreted. They believed that the Act of Congress of February 5, 1825, gave the right to vote for all 26 positions "to all, and to each of the qualified voters of the Territory" and that the top 26 overall vote-earners, regardless of district, ought to be certified as elected. They felt that the legislative council may have overstepped its power to "regulate the manner of election" by restricting voting to a subset of the 26 positions in each district. Concluding that they were not obligated to resolve the question, they certified two separate sets of results, which they termed the "General Ticket System" and the "District System".

Territorial Governor Lewis Cass submitted the District System results to Secretary of State Henry Clay on December 2, 1825. In a later letter, he recommended to Clay that the tie vote in the fifth district be broken in favor of Zephaniah W. Bunce on the grounds that he was an incumbent member of the council. On March 9, 1826, President John Quincy Adams announced the appointment of Bunce, William A. Burt, Henry Connor, Sidney Dole, Laurent Durocher, Abraham Edwards, Robert A. Forsyth, Robert Irwin Jr., Hubert Lacroix, Wolcott Lawrence, William F. Moseley, John Stockton, and Andrew G. Whitney to the second Michigan Territorial Council.

=== General ticket system results ===
The first set of results certified by the canvassers counted all votes cast for a person throughout the territory, irrespective of district. These results were not submitted to the secretary of state by Governor Cass.

General Ticket System (not submitted)
| Rank | Candidate | Total Votes |
|---|---|---|
| 1 | Abraham Edwards | 428 |
| 2 | Laurent Durocher | 339 |
| 3 | Henry Connor | 290 |
| 4 | Andrew G. Whitney | 288 |
| 5 | Robert A. Forsyth | 282 |
| 6 | John McDonell | 273 |
| 7 | Louis Baufet | 271 |
| 8 | Joseph Spencer | 268 |
| 9 | Wolcott Lawrence | 252 |
| 10 | William Little | 228 |
| 11 | George McDougall | 218 |
| 12 | Philip Lecuyer | 213 |
| 13 | Hubert Lacroix | 208 |
| 14 | Timothy C. Strong | 205 |
| 15 | Joseph Hickox | 204 |
| 16 | Thomas Rowland | 187 |
| 17 | John R. Williams | 174 |
| 18 | Charles J. Lanman | 168 |
| 19 | Robert Abbott | 168 |
| 20 | Sidney Dole | 161 |
| 21 | William F. Moseley | 154 |
| 22 | John Stockton | 141 |
| 23 | Levi Cook | 138 |
| 24 | Ebenezer Reed | 131 |
| 25 | William A. Fletcher | 128 |
| 26 | James Duane Doty | 117 |

=== District system results ===
The second set of results certified by the canvassers included only votes cast within the district where a candidate resided. These are the results Governor Cass submitted to the secretary of state for use by the president when selecting the members of the council.

1st District (Wayne) — 8 nominees
| Rank | Candidate | Total Votes |
|---|---|---|
| 1 | Abraham Edwards | 424 |
| 2 | Henry Connor | 289 |
| 3 | Andrew G. Whitney | 285 |
| 4 | Robert A. Forsyth | 280 |
| 5 | John McDonell | 271 |
| 6 | Louis Baufet | 270 |
| 7 | Joseph Spencer | 267 |
| 8 | William Little | 226 |

2nd District (Monroe) — 6 nominees
| Rank | Candidate | Total Votes |
|---|---|---|
| 1 | Laurent Durocher | 339 |
| 2 | Wolcott Lawrence | 252 |
| 3 | Hubert Lacroix | 207 |
| 4 | Charles J. Lanman | 167 |
| 5 | John B. Cicot | 100 |
| 6 | Gabriel Godfroy | 96 |

3rd District (Oakland) — 4 nominees
| Rank | Candidate | Total Votes |
|---|---|---|
| 1 | Sidney Dole | 160 |
| 2 | William F. Moseley | 154 |
| 3 | Daniel LeRoy | 84 |
| 4 | Daniel Bronson | 83 |

4th District (Macomb) — 4 nominees
| Rank | Candidate | Total Votes |
|---|---|---|
| 1 | John Stockton | 141 |
| 2 | William A. Burt | 91 |
| 3 | Christian Clemens | 78 |
| 4 | John Bennet | 53 |

5th District (St. Clair) — 2 nominees
| Rank | Candidate | Total Votes |
|---|---|---|
| 1 | Zephaniah W. Bunce | 50 |
| 2 | Eber Ward | 50 |

6th District (Brown, Crawford, Michilimackinac) — 2 nominees
| Rank | Candidate | Total Votes |
|---|---|---|
| 1 | James Duane Doty | 117 |
| 2 | Robert Irwin Jr. | 92 |
