= 2nd Michigan Territorial Council =

Legislature in Michigan Territory (1826–1827)

| ← | 1st Michigan Territorial Council | 3rd Michigan Territorial Council | → |

Overview
- Legislative body: Michigan Territorial Council
- Jurisdiction: Michigan Territory, United States
- Meeting place: Detroit
- Term: November 2, 1826 – April 13, 1827
- Election: 1825 Michigan Territorial Council election

Michigan Territorial Council
- Members: 13 members
- President: Abraham Edwards

Sessions
- 1st: November 2, 1826 – December 30, 1826
- 2nd: January 1, 1827 – April 13, 1827

The Second Michigan Territorial Council was a meeting of the legislative body governing Michigan Territory, known formally as the Legislative Council of the Territory of Michigan. The council met in Detroit in two regular sessions between November 2, 1826, and April 13, 1827, during the term of Lewis Cass as territorial governor.

== Leadership and organization ==
Abraham Edwards was president of the council; John P. Sheldon, Edmund A. Brush, and Randall S. Rice clerks; and William Meldrum sergeant-at-arms.

== Members ==
A February 5, 1825, act of the United States Congress expanded the size of the council from 9 to 13 members. Members were appointed by the president of the United States, with the advice and consent of the Senate, from a list of 26 people chosen in a general election. The council apportioned the 26 people, and thus the 13 seats, among the territory's counties in an act on April 13, 1825.

Members
| District | Counties | Name | Party | Notes |
|---|---|---|---|---|
| 1 | Wayne | Henry Connor | | |
| 1 | Wayne | Abraham Edwards | | |
| 1 | Wayne | Robert A. Forsyth | | |
| 1 | Wayne | John McDonell | Democratic | Seated November 16, 1826. |
| 2 | Monroe | Laurent Durocher | Democratic | |
| 2 | Monroe | Hubert Lacroix | | |
| 2 | Monroe | Wolcott Lawrence | | |
| 3 | Oakland | Sidney Dole | | |
| 3 | Oakland | William F. Moseley | | Seated November 6, 1826. |
| 4 | Macomb | William A. Burt | | |
| 4 | Macomb | John Stockton | | |
| 5 | St. Clair | Zephaniah W. Bunce | | Seated November 21, 1826. |
| 6 | Brown Crawford Michilimackinac | Robert Irwin Jr. | | Seated November 10, 1826. |
