= 3rd Michigan Territorial Council =

Legislature in Michigan Territory (1828–1829)

←	2nd Michigan Territorial Council	4th Michigan Territorial Council	→
- Districts of the Third Michigan Territorial Council

Overview
- Legislative body: Michigan Territorial Council
- Jurisdiction: Michigan Territory, United States
- Meeting place: Detroit
- Term: May 5, 1828 – November 5, 1829

Michigan Territorial Council
- Members: 13 members
- President: Abraham Edwards

Sessions
- 1st: May 5, 1828 – July 3, 1828
- 2nd: September 7, 1829 – November 5, 1829

The Third Michigan Territorial Council was a meeting of the legislative body governing Michigan Territory, known formally as the Legislative Council of the Territory of Michigan. The council met in Detroit in two regular sessions between May 5, 1828, and November 5, 1829, during the term of Lewis Cass as territorial governor.

== Leadership and organization ==
Abraham Edwards was president of the council; John P. Sheldon, Samuel Satterlee, and Seneca Allen clerks; and William Meldrum sergeant-at-arms.

== Members ==
A January 1827 act of the United States Congress provided for the direct election of a 13-member legislative council by the people of the territory; the same act gave the council responsibility for determining the apportionment of seats. On April 13, the council passed an act requiring the executive of the territory to determine the apportionment of seats based on a census. Governor Cass issued a proclamation on September 3, 1827, setting out the results:

... the counties of Crawford, Brown, Michilimackinac, and Chippewa form one district, which district is entitled to elect two members ... the counties of St. Clair and Macomb form one district, which district is entitled to elect one member ... the county of Oakland forms one district, which district is entitled to elect two members ... the county of Wayne forms one district, which district is entitled to elect four members ... the county of Washtenaw forms one district, which district is entitled to elect one member ... the counties of Monroe and Lenawe form one district, which district is entitled to elect three members of the legislative council.

Members
District	Name	Party	Notes
Brown Chippewa Crawford Michilimackinac	Robert Irwin Jr.		Seated May 18, 1828.
Brown Chippewa Crawford Michilimackinac	Henry R. Schoolcraft	Democratic	Seated May 18, 1828.
Lenawee Monroe	Laurent Durocher	Democratic	
Lenawee Monroe	Wolcott Lawrence		
Lenawee Monroe	Charles Noble	Whig	
Macomb St. Clair	John Stockton	Democratic	
Oakland	Thomas J. Drake	Whig	
Oakland	Stephen V. R. Trowbridge	Whig	
Washtenaw	Henry Rumsey	Democratic	
Wayne	William Brown		
Wayne	Henry Connor	Democratic	
Wayne	Abraham Edwards	Democratic	
Wayne	John McDonell	Democratic	
