= 1912 United States presidential election in Michigan =

- November 5, 1912

All 15 Michigan votes to the Electoral College
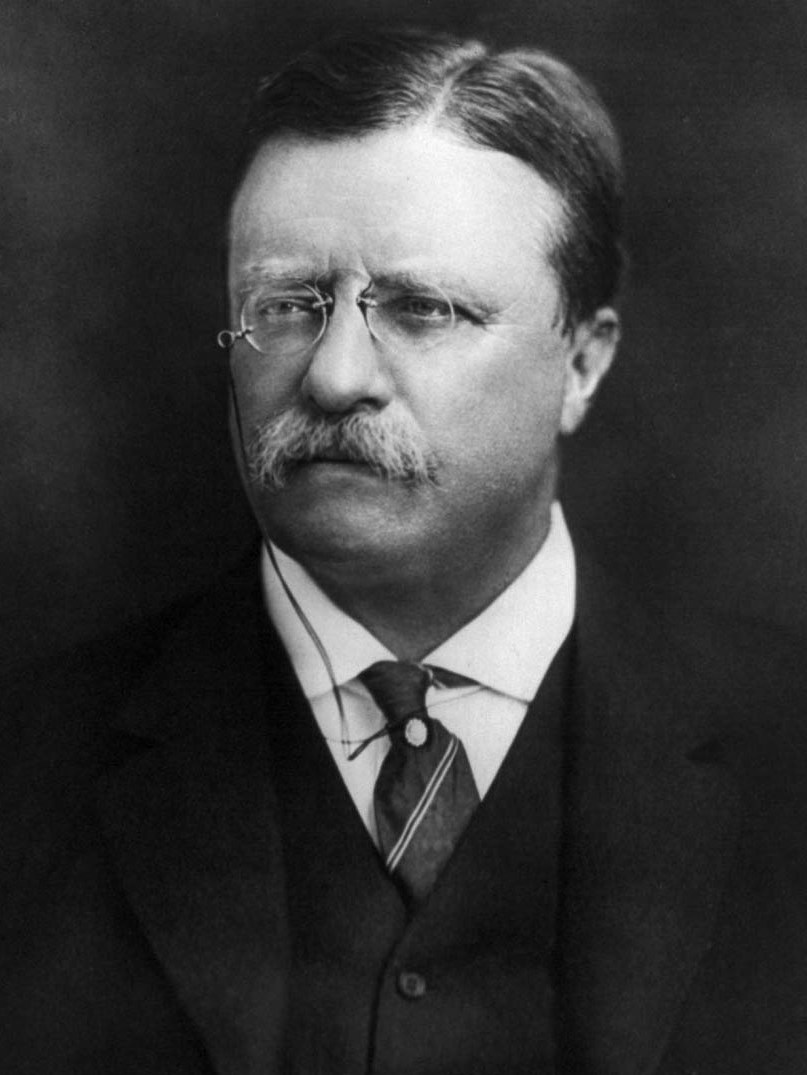

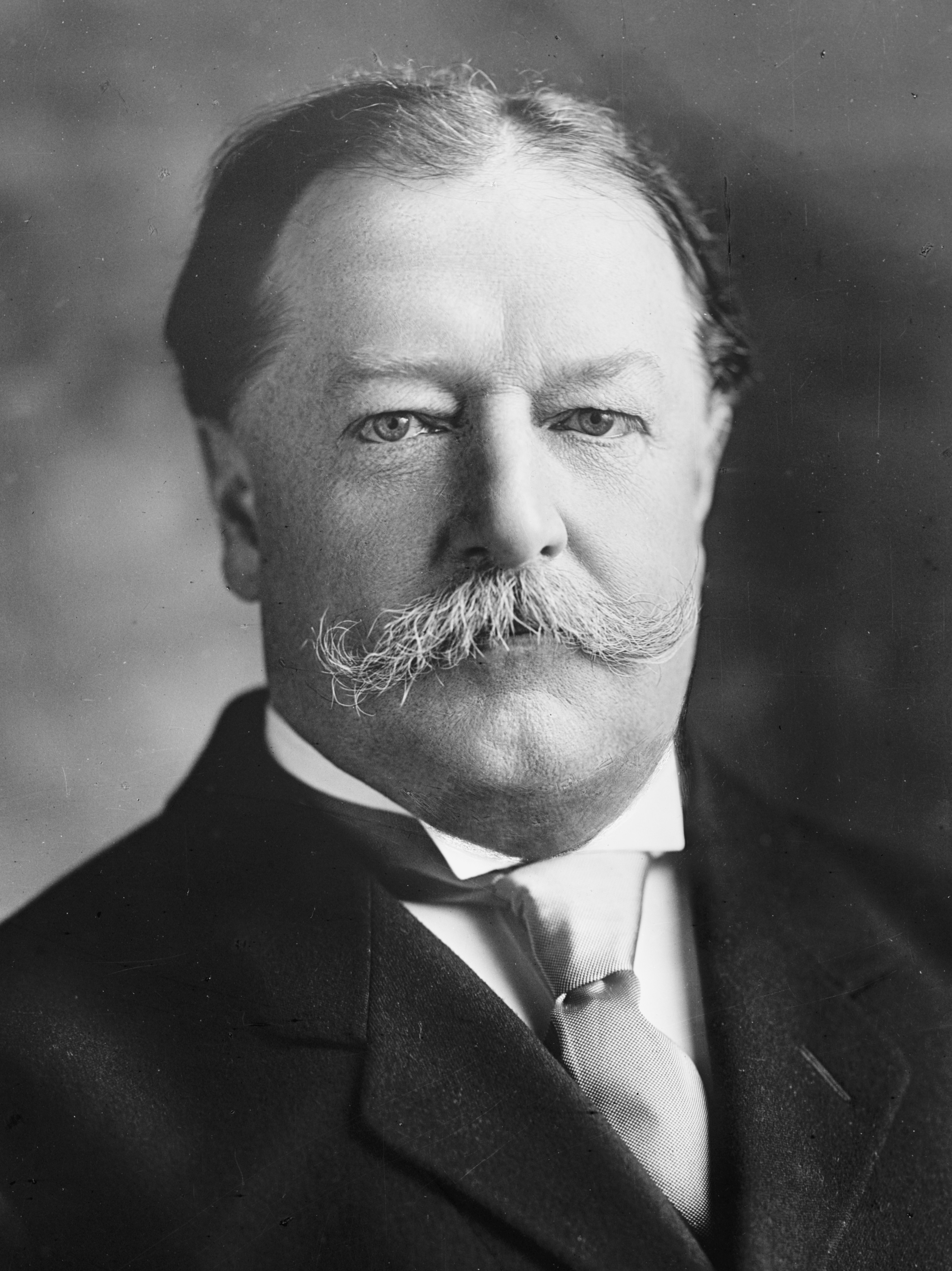

Nominee	Theodore Roosevelt	William Howard Taft	Woodrow Wilson
Party	Progressive	Republican	Democratic
Home state	New York	Ohio	New Jersey
Running mate	Hiram Johnson	Nicholas Murray Butler	Thomas R. Marshall
Electoral vote	15	0	0
Popular vote	214,584	152,244	150,751
Percentage	38.95%	27.63%	27.36%
County results
Roosevelt
30–40%
40–50%
50–60%
Taft
30–40%
40–50%
Wilson
30–40%
40–50%
President before election
William Howard Taft
Republican
Elected President
Woodrow Wilson
Democratic

The 1912 United States presidential election in Michigan took place on November 5, 1912, as part of the 1912 United States presidential election. Voters chose 15 representatives, or electors, to the Electoral College, who voted for president and vice president.

Following the Panic of 1893 and the Populist movement, Michigan would turn from a competitive Republican-leaning state into a rigidly one-party polity dominated by the Republican Party. The dominance of the culture of the Lower Peninsula by anti-slavery Yankees would be augmented by the turn of formerly Democratic-leaning German Catholics away from that party as a result of the remodelled party's agrarian and free silver sympathies, which became rigidly opposed by both the upper class and workers who followed them. The state Democratic Party was further crippled via the Populist movement severing its critical financial ties with business and commerce in Michigan as in other Northern states. A brief turn of the strongly evangelical Cabinet Counties toward the Populist movement in the 1896 presidential election would reverse itself following the return to prosperity under President William McKinley, so that these joined in Republican hegemony until the Great Depression.

In the 1894 elections, the Democratic Party lost all but one seat in the Michigan legislature, and the party would only make minor gains there for the next third of a century. Unlike the other states of the Upper Midwest, the Yankee influence on the culture of the Lower Peninsula was so strong that left-wing third parties did not provide significant opposition to the Republicans, nor was there more than a moderate degree of coordinated factionalism within the hegemonic Michigan Republican Party.

The state was not seriously affected by the split within the nationally dominant Republican Party during the Taft presidency. Only two of its ten Republican Congressmen were amongst the “Insurgents” who aligned with a revived Democratic Party. However, during 1911 state Governor Chase Osborn became one of the first politicians to work for a return of Theodore Roosevelt to the White House, and would soon call for both incumbent President Taft and rival progressive Robert M. La Follette to withdraw for Roosevelt to gain the nomination outright. Roosevelt would also soon gain the support of state party leader Frank Knox, although Taft supporters would dominate the state at actual party conventions. The state's few Democratic delegates backed eventual nominee, Princeton University President Woodrow Wilson of Virginia.

Former president Theodore Roosevelt and his Progressive Party campaigned extensively in the state during October but early polls had Wilson making a close race even in this most Republican of states. Indeed, during October the state was viewed as close between Roosevelt and Wilson, or even seeing Wilson ahead. However, Michigan was actually comfortably won by Roosevelt and running mate governor of California Hiram Johnson, with 38.95 percent of the popular vote, against the incumbent president William Howard Taft (R–Ohio), and running mate Columbia University President Nicholas Murray Butler, with 27.63 percent of the popular vote. Wilson and running mate governor of Indiana Thomas R. Marshall finished third with 27.36 percent.

== Results ==
General Election Results
Party	Pledged to	Elector	Votes
National Progressive	Theodore Roosevelt	Gustavus D. Pope	214,584
National Progressive	Theodore Roosevelt	Walter S. Powers	213,238
National Progressive	Theodore Roosevelt	Edmund S. Black	213,194
National Progressive	Theodore Roosevelt	Fred R. Belknap	213,188
National Progressive	Theodore Roosevelt	Gilbert T. Haan	213,165
National Progressive	Theodore Roosevelt	Owen D. Randall	213,157
National Progressive	Theodore Roosevelt	Sherman D. Eldred	213,151
National Progressive	Theodore Roosevelt	Virgil Hungerford	213,143
National Progressive	Theodore Roosevelt	Frederick M. Churchill	213,140
National Progressive	Theodore Roosevelt	John Vanderlaar	213,091
National Progressive	Theodore Roosevelt	Charles C. DeCamp	213,089
National Progressive	Theodore Roosevelt	Frederick C. Matthews	213,052
National Progressive	Theodore Roosevelt	Luther G. Beckwith	213,051
National Progressive	Theodore Roosevelt	Henry S. Dean	212,599
National Progressive	Theodore Roosevelt	Gates G. Burt	209,782 (Note: Burt's total is notably lower as he lost 2,807 votes in Van Buren County that were counted separately for "Batts G. Burt")
Republican	William Howard Taft	William Livingston	152,244
Republican	William Howard Taft	James R. Johnson	151,485
Republican	William Howard Taft	Henry M. Zimmerman	151,475
Republican	William Howard Taft	Walter R. Taylor	151,412
Republican	William Howard Taft	Thomas M. Koon	151,398
Republican	William Howard Taft	Andrew B. Dougherty	151,389
Republican	William Howard Taft	John N. Bagley	151,385
Republican	William Howard Taft	Thomas R. Welch	151,352
Republican	William Howard Taft	Elliott T. Slocum	151,346
Republican	William Howard Taft	Judd Yelland	151,335
Republican	William Howard Taft	Wilmer T. Culver	151,319
Republican	William Howard Taft	George W. McCormick	151,318
Republican	William Howard Taft	Harry T. Wickes	151,317
Republican	William Howard Taft	Rudolph Dueltgen	151,297
Republican	William Howard Taft	Silas G. Antisdale	151,282
Democratic	Woodrow Wilson	Andrew J. Dovel	150,751
Democratic	Woodrow Wilson	Charles R. Sligh	150,290
Democratic	Woodrow Wilson	John V. Sheehan	150,260
Democratic	Woodrow Wilson	Henry Blackwell	150,254
Democratic	Woodrow Wilson	John Strong	150,221
Democratic	Woodrow Wilson	James W. Henry	150,204
Democratic	Woodrow Wilson	Thomas A. Carton	150,192
Democratic	Woodrow Wilson	Benjamin R. Alward	150,181
Democratic	Woodrow Wilson	Arthur A. Graves	150,157
Democratic	Woodrow Wilson	Frank S. Treat	150,152
Democratic	Woodrow Wilson	John T. Winship	150,148
Democratic	Woodrow Wilson	John D. Cuddihy	150,130
Democratic	Woodrow Wilson	Benjamin H. Halstead	150,126
Democratic	Woodrow Wilson	George W. Crouter	150,094
Democratic	Woodrow Wilson	Daniel W. Goodenough	147,659 (Note: Goodenough's total is notably lower as he lost 2,482 votes in Eaton County that were counted separately for "David W. Goodenough")
Socialist	Eugene V. Debs	Ida Kummerfield	23,211
Socialist	Eugene V. Debs	George H. Sherman	23,067
Socialist	Eugene V. Debs	Joseph W. Blair	23,058
Socialist	Eugene V. Debs	Herman Mack	23,057
Socialist	Eugene V. Debs	William H. Knox	23,052
Socialist	Eugene V. Debs	Orville Gillette	23,051
Socialist	Eugene V. Debs	Alice McAfee	23,051
Socialist	Eugene V. Debs	William Krause	23,041
Socialist	Eugene V. Debs	David W. Walker	23,037
Socialist	Eugene V. Debs	Frank Aaltonen	23,030
Socialist	Eugene V. Debs	Archie Morse	23,030
Socialist	Eugene V. Debs	C. Edward dell	23,021
Socialist	Eugene V. Debs	Edgar M. Curry	22,989
Socialist	Eugene V. Debs	Ira Welch	22,972
Socialist	Eugene V. Debs	Frank Ardern	22,795
Prohibition	Eugene W. Chafin	John Russell	8,934
Prohibition	Eugene W. Chafin	Samuel Dickie	8,841
Prohibition	Eugene W. Chafin	Edward S. Townsend	8,798
Prohibition	Eugene W. Chafin	Milton G. Wylie	8,790
Prohibition	Eugene W. Chafin	William J. Faull	8,784
Prohibition	Eugene W. Chafin	John F. Eesley	8,782
Prohibition	Eugene W. Chafin	William G. Randall	8,782
Prohibition	Eugene W. Chafin	Horace J. Gilbert	8,781
Prohibition	Eugene W. Chafin	Leroy H. White	8,780
Prohibition	Eugene W. Chafin	Charles Bartlett	8,777
Prohibition	Eugene W. Chafin	Isaac N. Shepherd	8,773
Prohibition	Eugene W. Chafin	Oliver B. Walter	8,769
Prohibition	Eugene W. Chafin	Raymond H. Briggs	8,764
Prohibition	Eugene W. Chafin	Edward S. Saymond	8,745
Prohibition	Eugene W. Chafin	Oliver A. Rowland	8,724
Socialist Labor	Arthur Reimer	Hugh B. Reed	1,252
Socialist Labor	Arthur Reimer	Charles Wolberg	1,225
Votes cast (Note: Based on highest elector on each ticket)			550,976

=== Results by county ===
The results below are those for the highest elector on each ticket. The results listed in the 1913-1914 Michigan Manual are a "general average" for each ticket and thus not the "true" results.

County	Theodore Roosevelt Progressive		William Howard Taft Republican		Woodrow Wilson Democratic		Eugene V. Debs Socialist		Eugene W. Chafin Prohibition		Arthur Reimer Socialist Labor		Margin (Note: Roosevelt over Taft unless otherwise noted.)		Total votes cast
County	#	%	#	%	#	%	#	%	#	%	#	%	#	%	Total votes cast
Alcona	465	46.78%	292	29.38%	145	14.59%	82	8.25%	9	0.91%	1	0.10%	173	17.40%	994
Alger	471	42.86%	294	26.75%	264	24.02%	52	4.73%	18	1.64%	0	0.00%	177	16.11%	1,099
Allegan	3,119	40.84%	2,130	27.89%	1,935	25.33%	295	3.86%	133	1.74%	26	0.34%	989	12.95%	7,638
Alpena	1,660	46.46%	710	19.87%	1,112	31.12%	63	1.76%	24	0.67%	4	0.11%	548 (Note: Roosevelt's margin over Wilson)	15.34%	3,573
Antrim	1,234	49.22%	601	23.97%	455	18.15%	181	7.22%	36	1.44%	0	0.00%	633	25.25%	2,507
Arenac	959	48.02%	423	21.18%	453	22.68%	116	5.81%	43	2.15%	3	0.15%	506	25.34%	1,997
Baraga	511	44.71%	297	25.98%	281	24.58%	37	3.24%	17	1.49%	0	0.00%	214	18.72%	1,143
Barry	1,889	34.25%	1,590	28.83%	1,806	32.74%	105	1.90%	121	2.19%	5	0.09%	83	1.50%	5,516
Bay	4,760	42.48%	2,614	23.33%	2,989	26.68%	521	4.65%	238	2.12%	83	0.74%	1,771	15.81%	11,205
Benzie	649	33.78%	565	29.41%	331	17.23%	266	13.85%	102	5.31%	8	0.42%	84	4.37%	1,921
Berrien	4,353	36.37%	2,757	23.04%	4,234	35.38%	445	3.72%	179	1.50%	0	0.00%	119	0.99%	11,968
Branch	1,839	29.63%	1,879	30.27%	2,185	35.20%	170	2.74%	126	2.03%	8	0.13%	-306 (Note: Since Roosevelt finished third in this county, the margin is Wilson over Taft.)	-4.93%	6,207
Calhoun	4,472	34.09%	3,469	26.44%	3,793	28.91%	989	7.54%	229	1.75%	166	1.27%	679	5.18%	13,118
Cass	1,442	26.63%	1,472	27.19%	2,081	38.44%	344	6.35%	75	1.39%	0	0.00%	-609	-11.25%	5,414
Charlevoix	1,203	34.06%	1,300	36.81%	568	16.08%	409	11.58%	46	1.30%	6	0.17%	-97	-2.75%	3,532
Cheboygan	1,178	36.26%	900	27.70%	979	30.13%	146	4.49%	31	0.95%	15	0.46%	199	6.12%	3,249
Chippewa	1,605	41.92%	890	23.24%	883	23.06%	193	5.04%	251	6.56%	7	0.18%	715	18.67%	3,829
Clare	663	36.35%	561	30.76%	437	23.96%	126	6.91%	30	1.64%	7	0.38%	102	5.59%	1,824
Clinton	1,826	33.65%	1,737	32.01%	1,729	31.86%	41	0.76%	91	1.68%	3	0.06%	89	1.64%	5,427
Crawford	250	33.65%	261	35.13%	187	25.17%	35	4.71%	9	1.21%	1	0.13%	-11	-1.48%	743
Delta	1,922	43.80%	1,114	25.39%	1,061	24.18%	246	5.61%	45	1.03%	0	0.00%	808	18.41%	4,388
Dickinson	1,338	39.74%	1,384	41.10%	361	10.72%	234	6.95%	43	1.28%	7	0.21%	-46	-1.37%	3,367
Eaton	2,234	30.59%	2,335	31.97%	2,481	33.97%	123	1.68%	112	1.53%	19	0.26%	-146	-2.00%	7,304
Emmet	1,104	33.05%	835	25.00%	925	27.69%	420	12.57%	56	1.68%	0	0.00%	179	5.36%	3,340
Genesee	5,948	44.52%	3,447	25.80%	3,016	22.57%	659	4.93%	255	1.91%	35	0.26%	2,501	18.72%	13,360
Gladwin	563	33.98%	639	38.56%	336	20.28%	88	5.31%	26	1.57%	5	0.30%	-76	-4.59%	1,657
Gogebic	1,368	44.75%	825	26.99%	572	18.71%	124	4.06%	147	4.81%	21	0.69%	543	17.76%	3,057
Grand Traverse	1,697	43.30%	910	23.22%	943	24.06%	292	7.45%	58	1.48%	19	0.48%	754	19.24%	3,919
Gratiot	2,135	36.11%	1,810	30.62%	1,836	31.06%	45	0.76%	83	1.40%	3	0.05%	299	5.06%	5,912
Hillsdale	3,071	43.91%	1,443	20.63%	2,238	32.00%	60	0.86%	176	2.52%	6	0.09%	833	11.91%	6,994
Houghton	5,472	44.63%	3,575	29.16%	2,385	19.45%	448	3.65%	371	3.03%	10	0.08%	1,897	15.47%	12,261
Huron	3,188	50.05%	1,821	28.59%	1,238	19.44%	69	1.08%	51	0.80%	2	0.03%	1,367	21.46%	6,369
Ingham	4,810	36.43%	3,519	26.65%	3,927	29.74%	573	4.34%	326	2.47%	50	0.38%	883	6.69%	13,205
Ionia	2,599	33.48%	2,045	26.34%	2,766	35.63%	173	2.23%	168	2.16%	12	0.15%	-167 (Note: Wilson's margin over Roosevelt)	-2.15%	7,763
Iosco	814	44.97%	519	28.67%	420	23.20%	30	1.66%	25	1.38%	2	0.11%	295	16.30%	1,810
Iron	883	38.37%	1,037	45.07%	221	9.60%	108	4.69%	25	1.09%	27	1.17%	-154	-6.69%	2,301
Isabella	1,777	36.91%	1,424	29.58%	1,403	29.14%	142	2.95%	64	1.33%	4	0.08%	353	7.33%	4,814
Jackson	5,841	44.21%	2,465	18.66%	4,290	32.47%	378	2.86%	204	1.54%	33	0.25%	1,551	11.74%	13,211
Kalamazoo	4,177	33.64%	2,659	21.42%	3,685	29.68%	1,448	11.66%	407	3.28%	40	0.32%	492	3.96%	12,416
Kalkaska	479	34.14%	449	32.00%	298	21.24%	129	9.19%	44	3.14%	4	0.29%	30	2.14%	1,403
Kent	13,617	42.55%	6,538	20.43%	9,437	29.49%	1,900	5.94%	452	1.41%	60	0.19%	4,180	13.06%	32,004
Keweenaw	505	45.37%	497	44.65%	60	5.39%	33	2.96%	17	1.53%	1	0.09%	8	0.72%	1,113
Lake	480	50.31%	230	24.11%	189	19.81%	46	4.82%	9	0.94%	0	0.00%	250	26.21%	954
Lapeer	2,322	42.90%	1,735	32.06%	1,208	22.32%	39	0.72%	104	1.92%	4	0.07%	587	10.85%	5,412
Leelanau	687	38.75%	624	35.19%	349	19.68%	86	4.85%	23	1.30%	4	0.23%	63	3.55%	1,773
Lenawee	3,512	31.59%	2,999	26.98%	4,247	38.20%	141	1.27%	218	1.96%	0	0.00%	-735	-6.61%	11,117
Livingston	1,457	29.46%	1,407	28.45%	1,963	39.69%	14	0.28%	104	2.10%	1	0.02%	-506	-10.23%	4,946
Luce	271	43.29%	234	37.38%	102	16.29%	11	1.76%	8	1.28%	0	0.00%	37	5.91%	626
Mackinac	396	22.36%	612	34.56%	733	41.39%	0	0.00%	28	1.58%	2	0.11%	-121	-6.83%	1,771
Macomb	1,808	24.73%	2,519	34.45%	2,838	38.81%	31	0.42%	110	1.50%	6	0.08%	-319	-4.36%	7,312
Manistee	1,316	27.76%	1,237	26.10%	1,804	38.06%	290	6.12%	79	1.67%	14	0.30%	-488	-10.30%	4,740
Marquette	3,625	46.09%	2,617	33.27%	1,000	12.71%	492	6.26%	109	1.39%	22	0.28%	1,008	12.82%	7,865
Mason	1,737	44.14%	843	21.42%	1,072	27.24%	176	4.47%	104	2.64%	3	0.08%	665	16.90%	3,935
Mecosta	1,654	41.63%	1,054	26.53%	971	24.44%	203	5.11%	85	2.14%	6	0.15%	600	15.10%	3,973
Menominee	1,825	41.04%	1,192	26.80%	1,199	26.96%	193	4.34%	34	0.76%	4	0.09%	626	14.08%	4,447
Midland	1,443	46.41%	906	29.14%	671	21.58%	45	1.45%	43	1.38%	1	0.03%	537	17.27%	3,109
Missaukee	903	44.11%	672	32.83%	346	16.90%	83	4.05%	35	1.71%	8	0.39%	231	11.28%	2,047
Monroe	1,890	26.10%	2,251	31.08%	2,933	40.50%	70	0.97%	89	1.23%	9	0.12%	-682	-9.42%	7,242
Montcalm	2,853	43.67%	1,876	28.72%	1,381	21.14%	290	4.44%	114	1.74%	19	0.29%	977	14.95%	6,533
Montmorency	239	32.04%	325	43.57%	163	21.85%	16	2.14%	3	0.40%	0	0.00%	-86	-11.53%	746
Muskegon	4,331	52.33%	1,526	18.44%	1,679	20.29%	639	7.72%	73	0.88%	29	0.35%	2,652	32.04%	8,277
Newaygo	1,861	47.32%	961	24.43%	778	19.78%	246	6.25%	78	1.98%	9	0.23%	900	22.88%	3,933
Oakland	3,317	28.71%	4,087	35.38%	3,676	31.82%	217	1.88%	252	2.18%	4	0.03%	-411 (Note: Since Roosevelt finished third in this county, the margin is Taft over Wilson.)	-3.56%	11,553
Oceana	1,847	49.20%	856	22.80%	804	21.42%	121	3.22%	115	3.06%	11	0.29%	991	26.40%	3,754
Ogemaw	731	42.67%	539	31.47%	317	18.51%	78	4.55%	42	2.45%	6	0.35%	192	11.21%	1,713
Ontonagon	513	29.30%	721	41.18%	359	20.50%	137	7.82%	21	1.20%	0	0.00%	-208	-11.88%	1,751
Osceola	1,417	39.79%	1,328	37.29%	612	17.19%	103	2.89%	96	2.70%	5	0.14%	89	2.50%	3,561
Oscoda	159	46.49%	110	32.16%	68	19.88%	3	0.88%	1	0.29%	1	0.29%	49	14.33%	342
Otsego	381	36.22%	449	42.68%	195	18.54%	12	1.14%	15	1.43%	0	0.00%	-68	-6.46%	1,052
Ottawa	4,416	50.38%	1,831	20.89%	2,043	23.31%	335	3.82%	125	1.43%	16	0.18%	2,373	27.07%	8,766
Presque Isle	899	45.73%	732	37.23%	263	13.38%	59	3.00%	12	0.61%	1	0.05%	167	8.49%	1,966
Roscommon	275	45.91%	136	22.70%	150	25.04%	30	5.01%	6	1.00%	2	0.33%	125	20.87%	599
Saginaw	5,679	31.49%	5,040	27.94%	5,850	32.44%	1,292	7.16%	175	0.97%	0	0.00%	-171	-0.95%	18,036
Sanilac	3,227	47.75%	2,170	32.11%	1,172	17.34%	72	1.07%	113	1.67%	4	0.06%	1,057	15.64%	6,758
Schoolcraft	575	36.44%	596	37.77%	341	21.61%	49	3.11%	14	0.89%	3	0.19%	-21	-1.33%	1,578
Shiawassee	2,908	37.72%	2,314	30.02%	1,959	25.41%	250	3.24%	265	3.44%	13	0.17%	594	7.71%	7,709
St. Clair	4,428	41.04%	2,974	27.57%	3,011	27.91%	241	2.23%	112	1.04%	23	0.21%	1,417	13.13%	10,789
St. Joseph	2,399	37.22%	1,224	18.99%	2,396	37.18%	326	5.06%	90	1.40%	10	0.16%	3	0.05%	6,445
Tuscola	3,357	45.37%	2,568	34.71%	1,257	16.99%	58	0.78%	148	2.00%	11	0.15%	789	10.66%	7,399
Van Buren	2,828	38.79%	2,112	28.97%	2,006	27.51%	257	3.52%	88	1.21%	0	0.00%	716	9.82%	7,291
Washtenaw	3,642	34.50%	2,495	23.64%	4,164	39.45%	118	1.12%	121	1.15%	16	0.15%	-522	-4.95%	10,556
Wayne	35,170	39.23%	27,034	30.15%	22,916	25.56%	3,693	4.12%	583	0.65%	265	0.30%	8,136	9.07%	89,661
Wexford	1,716	42.19%	1,076	26.46%	820	20.16%	311	7.65%	127	3.12%	17	0.42%	640	15.74%	4,067
Totals	214,584	38.95%	152,244	27.63%	150,751	27.36%	23,211	4.21%	8,934	1.62%	1,252	0.23%	62,340	11.31%	550,976

==== Counties that flipped from Republican to Progressive ====
- Alcona
- Alger
- Allegan
- Alpena
- Antrim
- Arenac
- Baraga
- Barry
- Bay
- Benzie
- Berrien
- Calhoun
- Cheboygan
- Chippewa
- Clare
- Clinton
- Delta
- Emmet
- Genesee
- Gogebic
- Grand Traverse
- Gratiot
- Hillsdale
- Houghton
- Huron
- Ingham
- Iosco
- Isabella
- Jackson
- Kalamazoo
- Kalkaska
- Kent
- Keweenaw
- Lake
- Lapeer
- Leelanau
- Luce
- Marquette
- Mason
- Mecosta
- Menominee
- Midland
- Missaukee
- Montcalm
- Muskegon
- Newaygo
- Oceana
- Ogemaw
- Osceola
- Oscoda
- Ottawa
- Presque Isle
- Roscommon
- Sanilac
- Shiawassee
- St. Clair
- St. Joseph
- Tuscola
- Van Buren
- Wayne
- Wexford

==== Counties that flipped from Republican to Democratic ====
- Branch
- Cass
- Eaton
- Ionia
- Lenawee
- Livingston
- Mackinac
- Macomb
- Manistee
- Monroe
- Saginaw
- Washtenaw

== Analysis ==
Michigan was one of only two states where Democratic candidate Woodrow Wilson came in third behind former president of the United States Theodore Roosevelt and the current president of the United States William Howard Taft — the only other such state being Vermont where Wilson finished a much more distant third. Since 1912 there has been only one occasion (Bill Clinton in Utah in 1992) where a winning presidential candidate finished third in any non-Confederate state.

As of the 2024 presidential election, this is the last election in which Ottawa County, Sanilac County, and Missaukee County did not support the Republican candidate. This was the first time since 1852 that Michigan voted for a non-Republican presidential candidate, (Note: In 1892, Michigan used the congressional district method, and Democratic nominee Grover Cleveland received 5 electoral votes.) and the only time Michigan ever voted for a third-party presidential candidate.

With 38.95 percent of the popular vote, Michigan would prove to be Roosevelt's third-strongest state in terms of popular vote percentage in the 1912 election after South Dakota (where Taft was not on the ballot) and California (where Taft was a write-in candidate).

== See also ==
- United States presidential elections in Michigan
