= 1932 United States presidential election in Michigan =

- November 8, 1932

All 19 Michigan votes to the Electoral College

Nominee	Franklin D. Roosevelt	Herbert Hoover
Party	Democratic	Republican
Home state	New York	California
Running mate	John Nance Garner	Charles Curtis
Electoral vote	19	0
Popular vote	871,700	739,894
Percentage	52.36%	44.44%
County results
Roosevelt
40–50%
50–60%
60–70%
Hoover
40–50%
50–60%
60–70%
70–80%
President before election
Herbert Hoover
Republican
Elected President
Franklin D. Roosevelt
Democratic

The 1932 United States presidential election in Michigan took place on November 8, 1932, as part of the 1932 United States presidential election. Voters chose 19 representatives, or electors, to the Electoral College, who voted for president and vice president.

Michigan was won by the Democratic candidate Franklin D. Roosevelt, who defeated incumbent Republican Herbert Hoover, receiving 52.36% of the popular vote and the state's 19 electoral votes.

As a result of his victory, Roosevelt became the first Democratic presidential candidate since Grover Cleveland in 1892 to get electoral votes from Michigan as well as the first since Franklin Pierce in 1852 to win the state entirely. This was the first time since the creation of the Republican Party that a Democrat won Michigan, as the state voted straight Republican in all but one election from 1856 to 1928.

This is one of only four occasions where Michigan and Pennsylvania voted for different presidential candidates ever since the Democrats and Republicans became the two major parties in U.S. politics. (Note: The other times were in 1856, 1940, and 1976. Additionally, this was the only one of the four where Michigan backed the Democrat and Pennsylvania backed the Republican.) This was also the only one of the 32 elections between 1872 and 1996 where Houghton County did not vote for the statewide winner.

== Results ==
1932 United States presidential election in Michigan
Party	Candidate	Votes	%
Democratic	Franklin D. Roosevelt	871,700	52.36%
Republican	Herbert Hoover (inc.)	739,894	44.44%
Socialist	Norman Thomas	39,205	2.35%
Communist	William Z. Foster	9,318	0.56%
Prohibition	William D. Upshaw	2,893	0.17%
Socialist Labor	Verne L. Reynolds	1,401	0.08%
Liberty	William Hope Harvey	217	0.01%
Farmer–Labor	Jacob Coxey	137	0.01%
Total votes		1,664,765	100.00%

=== Results by county ===
County	Franklin D. Roosevelt Democratic		Herbert Hoover Republican		Norman Thomas Socialist		William Foster Communist		William D. Upshaw Prohibition		All Others Various		Margin		Total votes cast
County	#	%	#	%	#	%	#	%	#	%	#	%	#	%	Total votes cast
Alcona	884	47.99%	881	47.83%	72	3.91%	5	0.27%	0	0.00%	0	0.00%	3	0.16%	1,842
Alger	2,111	57.21%	1,354	36.69%	76	2.06%	138	3.74%	4	0.11%	7	0.19%	757	20.51%	3,690
Allegan	7,030	43.71%	8,705	54.13%	264	1.64%	22	0.14%	45	0.28%	16	0.10%	-1,675	-10.42%	16,082
Alpena	3,562	50.84%	3,222	45.99%	202	2.88%	4	0.06%	9	0.13%	7	0.10%	340	4.85%	7,006
Antrim	1,686	40.55%	2,308	55.51%	142	3.42%	3	0.07%	12	0.29%	7	0.17%	-622	-14.96%	4,158
Arenac	2,086	56.90%	1,471	40.13%	86	2.35%	13	0.35%	7	0.19%	3	0.08%	615	16.78%	3,666
Baraga	2,016	49.34%	1,917	46.92%	22	0.54%	122	2.99%	2	0.05%	7	0.17%	99	2.42%	4,086
Barry	4,416	47.70%	4,556	49.21%	211	2.28%	1	0.01%	68	0.73%	6	0.06%	-140	-1.51%	9,258
Bay	14,708	58.62%	9,816	39.12%	545	2.17%	3	0.01%	12	0.05%	8	0.03%	4,892	19.50%	25,092
Benzie	1,432	45.09%	1,595	50.22%	103	3.24%	33	1.04%	12	0.38%	1	0.03%	-163	-5.13%	3,176
Berrien	18,447	55.46%	14,123	42.46%	568	1.71%	33	0.10%	69	0.21%	24	0.07%	4,324	13.00%	33,264
Branch	5,685	53.43%	4,663	43.83%	181	1.70%	99	0.93%	7	0.07%	5	0.05%	1,022	9.61%	10,640
Calhoun	16,281	48.51%	16,255	48.43%	894	2.66%	35	0.10%	73	0.22%	25	0.07%	26	0.08%	33,563
Cass	5,349	55.51%	3,994	41.45%	196	2.03%	10	0.10%	67	0.70%	20	0.21%	1,355	14.06%	9,636
Charlevoix	2,344	44.30%	2,623	49.57%	300	5.67%	4	0.08%	8	0.15%	12	0.23%	-279	-5.27%	5,291
Cheboygan	3,431	59.04%	2,309	39.73%	49	0.84%	8	0.14%	9	0.15%	5	0.09%	1,122	19.31%	5,811
Chippewa	4,221	43.67%	5,252	54.34%	67	0.69%	102	1.06%	10	0.10%	13	0.13%	-1,031	-10.67%	9,665
Clare	1,741	52.38%	1,474	44.34%	93	2.80%	3	0.09%	7	0.21%	6	0.18%	267	8.03%	3,324
Clinton	5,098	51.74%	4,647	47.16%	86	0.87%	21	0.21%	1	0.01%	0	0.00%	451	4.58%	9,853
Crawford	755	56.47%	559	41.81%	17	1.27%	3	0.22%	3	0.22%	0	0.00%	196	14.66%	1,337
Delta	7,363	59.93%	4,386	35.70%	473	3.85%	56	0.46%	2	0.02%	5	0.04%	2,977	24.23%	12,285
Dickinson	6,483	53.88%	5,120	42.55%	328	2.73%	64	0.53%	12	0.10%	25	0.21%	1,363	11.33%	12,032
Eaton	6,887	52.29%	5,840	44.34%	356	2.70%	1	0.01%	72	0.55%	16	0.12%	1,047	7.95%	13,172
Emmet	3,110	49.56%	2,890	46.06%	249	3.97%	17	0.27%	7	0.11%	2	0.03%	220	3.51%	6,275
Genesee	36,860	54.80%	28,231	41.97%	1,866	2.77%	141	0.21%	107	0.16%	62	0.09%	8,629	12.83%	67,267
Gladwin	1,661	52.86%	1,378	43.86%	79	2.51%	6	0.19%	14	0.45%	4	0.13%	283	9.01%	3,142
Gogebic	5,531	48.01%	5,379	46.69%	199	1.73%	387	3.36%	15	0.13%	10	0.09%	152	1.32%	11,521
Grand Traverse	3,907	51.88%	3,442	45.70%	151	2.01%	6	0.08%	20	0.27%	5	0.07%	465	6.17%	7,531
Gratiot	6,124	53.08%	5,123	44.40%	187	1.62%	5	0.04%	88	0.76%	11	0.10%	1,001	8.68%	11,538
Hillsdale	5,696	48.00%	5,879	49.54%	182	1.53%	14	0.12%	80	0.67%	16	0.13%	-183	-1.54%	11,867
Houghton	7,838	37.72%	12,308	59.23%	173	0.83%	411	1.98%	16	0.08%	34	0.16%	-4,470	-21.51%	20,780
Huron	5,770	49.36%	5,707	48.82%	189	1.62%	7	0.06%	11	0.09%	6	0.05%	63	0.54%	11,690
Ingham	22,370	50.22%	21,044	47.24%	963	2.16%	30	0.07%	94	0.21%	44	0.10%	1,326	2.98%	44,545
Ionia	8,695	57.58%	6,074	40.23%	268	1.77%	56	0.37%	7	0.05%	0	0.00%	2,621	17.36%	15,100
Iosco	1,500	47.08%	1,581	49.62%	90	2.82%	7	0.22%	4	0.13%	4	0.13%	-81	-2.54%	3,186
Iron	3,416	42.09%	4,347	53.56%	59	0.73%	270	3.33%	4	0.05%	20	0.25%	-931	-11.47%	8,116
Isabella	4,272	49.42%	4,211	48.71%	110	1.27%	5	0.06%	41	0.47%	6	0.07%	61	0.71%	8,645
Jackson	16,584	49.17%	16,150	47.88%	757	2.24%	99	0.29%	81	0.24%	59	0.17%	434	1.29%	33,730
Kalamazoo	13,974	41.36%	18,584	55.01%	873	2.58%	174	0.52%	138	0.41%	42	0.12%	-4,610	-13.65%	33,785
Kalkaska	649	43.70%	705	47.47%	109	7.34%	20	1.35%	2	0.13%	0	0.00%	-56	-3.77%	1,485
Kent	41,601	47.97%	42,186	48.64%	2,359	2.72%	309	0.36%	145	0.17%	123	0.14%	-585	-0.67%	86,723
Keweenaw	527	26.26%	1,454	72.45%	5	0.25%	19	0.95%	1	0.05%	1	0.05%	-927	-46.19%	2,007
Lake	1,241	53.68%	991	42.86%	48	2.08%	32	1.38%	0	0.00%	0	0.00%	250	10.81%	2,312
Lapeer	4,315	45.85%	4,882	51.87%	156	1.66%	6	0.06%	46	0.49%	7	0.07%	-567	-6.02%	9,412
Leelanau	1,746	52.70%	1,527	46.09%	28	0.85%	4	0.12%	6	0.18%	2	0.06%	219	6.61%	3,313
Lenawee	10,420	48.23%	10,912	50.50%	205	0.95%	7	0.03%	51	0.24%	12	0.06%	-492	-2.28%	21,607
Livingston	4,684	50.06%	4,534	48.46%	104	1.11%	3	0.03%	30	0.32%	2	0.02%	150	1.60%	9,357
Luce	928	41.52%	1,259	56.33%	18	0.81%	22	0.98%	5	0.22%	3	0.13%	-331	-14.81%	2,235
Mackinac	2,578	62.74%	1,504	36.60%	22	0.54%	1	0.02%	1	0.02%	3	0.07%	1,074	26.14%	4,109
Macomb	16,539	63.65%	8,649	33.29%	594	2.29%	142	0.55%	36	0.14%	24	0.09%	7,890	30.36%	25,984
Manistee	4,475	55.14%	3,256	40.12%	323	3.98%	26	0.32%	22	0.27%	13	0.16%	1,219	15.02%	8,115
Marquette	7,221	40.96%	9,810	55.65%	258	1.46%	311	1.76%	13	0.07%	16	0.09%	-2,589	-14.69%	17,629
Mason	3,854	52.85%	3,098	42.48%	262	3.59%	50	0.69%	24	0.33%	4	0.05%	756	10.37%	7,292
Mecosta	3,152	47.51%	3,336	50.28%	111	1.67%	6	0.09%	21	0.32%	9	0.14%	-184	-2.77%	6,635
Menominee	5,782	61.04%	3,374	35.62%	281	2.97%	23	0.24%	4	0.04%	9	0.10%	2,408	25.42%	9,473
Midland	3,553	47.44%	3,791	50.62%	121	1.62%	1	0.01%	20	0.27%	3	0.04%	-238	-3.18%	7,489
Missaukee	1,282	45.97%	1,439	51.60%	39	1.40%	4	0.14%	23	0.82%	2	0.07%	-157	-5.63%	2,789
Monroe	12,417	62.05%	7,255	36.26%	270	1.35%	21	0.10%	37	0.18%	10	0.05%	5,162	25.80%	20,010
Montcalm	5,704	50.02%	5,166	45.30%	464	4.07%	1	0.01%	52	0.46%	16	0.14%	538	4.72%	11,403
Montmorency	903	57.74%	595	38.04%	57	3.64%	2	0.13%	5	0.32%	2	0.13%	308	19.69%	1,564
Muskegon	13,497	51.39%	11,971	45.58%	508	1.93%	215	0.82%	50	0.19%	24	0.09%	1,526	5.81%	26,265
Newaygo	3,275	47.10%	3,458	49.73%	183	2.63%	13	0.19%	19	0.27%	5	0.07%	-183	-2.63%	6,953
Oakland	33,135	48.78%	32,462	47.79%	1,967	2.90%	212	0.31%	67	0.10%	85	0.13%	673	0.99%	67,928
Oceana	3,051	53.46%	2,481	43.47%	120	2.10%	7	0.12%	35	0.61%	13	0.23%	570	9.99%	5,707
Ogemaw	1,645	51.34%	1,472	45.94%	71	2.22%	2	0.06%	8	0.25%	6	0.19%	173	5.40%	3,204
Ontonagon	2,337	46.53%	2,287	45.53%	43	0.86%	307	6.11%	6	0.12%	43	0.86%	50	1.00%	5,023
Osceola	2,321	43.13%	2,969	55.18%	60	1.12%	5	0.09%	26	0.48%	0	0.00%	-648	-12.04%	5,381
Oscoda	349	45.03%	410	52.90%	9	1.16%	5	0.65%	2	0.26%	0	0.00%	-61	-7.87%	775
Otsego	1,377	55.23%	1,006	40.35%	108	4.33%	1	0.04%	1	0.04%	0	0.00%	371	14.88%	2,493
Ottawa	7,981	38.56%	12,076	58.34%	567	2.74%	20	0.10%	44	0.21%	12	0.06%	-4,095	-19.78%	20,700
Presque Isle	2,217	57.36%	1,560	40.36%	71	1.84%	6	0.16%	5	0.13%	6	0.16%	657	17.00%	3,865
Roscommon	757	53.69%	601	42.62%	42	2.98%	4	0.28%	3	0.21%	3	0.21%	156	11.06%	1,410
Saginaw	22,643	54.67%	17,794	42.97%	833	2.01%	50	0.12%	60	0.14%	34	0.08%	4,849	11.71%	41,414
Sanilac	4,077	36.39%	6,860	61.22%	228	2.03%	3	0.03%	27	0.24%	10	0.09%	-2,783	-24.84%	11,205
Schoolcraft	1,660	47.28%	1,722	49.05%	113	3.22%	1	0.03%	6	0.17%	9	0.26%	-62	-1.77%	3,511
Shiawassee	8,002	53.58%	6,600	44.19%	251	1.68%	4	0.03%	72	0.48%	7	0.05%	1,402	9.39%	14,936
St. Clair	12,776	45.56%	14,883	53.08%	313	1.12%	8	0.03%	55	0.20%	6	0.02%	-2,107	-7.51%	28,041
St. Joseph	6,917	53.82%	5,626	43.78%	230	1.79%	4	0.03%	69	0.54%	6	0.05%	1,291	10.05%	12,852
Tuscola	5,077	44.66%	6,110	53.75%	142	1.25%	1	0.01%	29	0.26%	8	0.07%	-1,033	-9.09%	11,367
Van Buren	7,223	49.33%	6,954	47.50%	402	2.75%	10	0.07%	41	0.28%	11	0.08%	269	1.84%	14,641
Washtenaw	12,552	43.13%	15,368	52.81%	1,064	3.66%	64	0.22%	34	0.12%	18	0.06%	-2,816	-9.68%	29,100
Wayne	310,686	57.15%	212,678	39.12%	14,226	2.62%	5,168	0.95%	229	0.04%	614	0.11%	98,008	18.03%	543,601
Wexford	3,251	47.78%	3,425	50.34%	94	1.38%	4	0.06%	26	0.38%	4	0.06%	-174	-2.56%	6,804
Totals	871,700	52.36%	739,894	44.44%	39,205	2.35%	9,318	0.56%	2,893	0.17%	1,755	0.11%	131,806	7.92%	1,664,765

==== Counties that flipped from Republican to Democratic ====
- Alcona
- Alpena
- Branch
- Clare
- Clinton
- Gladwin
- Huron
- Isabella
- Leelanau
- Livingston
- Montcalm
- Roscommon
- St. Joseph
- Van Buren
- Memominee
- Arenac
- Baraga
- Berrien
- Calhoun
- Cass
- Cheboygan
- Chippewa
- Crawford
- Eaton
- Emmet
- Grand Traverse
- Gratiot
- Houghton
- Ingham
- Ionia
- Jackson
- Kalamazoo
- Kalkaska
- Kent
- Lake
- Luce
- Mackinac
- Manistee
- Mason
- Monroe
- Montmorency
- Oceana
- Oakland
- Ogemaw
- Otsego
- Oscoda
- Saginaw
- Shiawassee
- Wexford
- Alger
- Bay
- Delta
- Dickinson
- Genesee
- Gogebic
- Iron
- Macomb
- Marquette
- Muskegon
- Wayne

== See also ==
- United States presidential elections in Michigan
