= 1st Michigan Territorial Council =

Legislature in Michigan Territory (1824–1825)

←	Governor and judges of Michigan Territory	2nd Michigan Territorial Council	→

Overview
- Legislative body: Michigan Territorial Council
- Jurisdiction: Michigan Territory, United States
- Meeting place: Detroit
- Term: June 7, 1824 – April 21, 1825
- Election: 1823 Michigan Territorial Council election

Michigan Territorial Council
- Members: 9 members
- President: Abraham Edwards

Sessions
- 1st: June 7, 1824 – August 5, 1824
- 2nd: January 17, 1825 – April 21, 1825

The First Michigan Territorial Council was a meeting of the legislative body governing Michigan Territory, known formally as the Legislative Council of the Territory of Michigan. The council met in Detroit in two regular sessions between June 7, 1824, and April 21, 1825, during the term of Lewis Cass as territorial governor.

== Background ==
Since its creation from part of Indiana Territory in 1805, the government of Michigan Territory had consisted of a governor, a secretary, and three judges; the governor and judges together formed the legislative branch of government. This was the first stage of territorial government outlined in the Northwest Ordinance. An election called by Governor Cass in 1818 to decide whether to move to the second stage of government—an elected legislature—failed largely due to concerns over the cost that would be borne by the territory. Public discontent with the first stage government continued to mount, until in 1822 hundreds of residents petitioned Congress for reform.

An act of Congress on March 3, 1823, created a four-year term for the judges and transferred the powers of the territory to the governor and a legislative council of nine people serving terms of two years. Members of the council were to be appointed by the president of the United States, with the advice and consent of the Senate, from a slate of 18 people chosen in a general election.

== Leadership and organization ==
Abraham Edwards was president of the council; John P. Sheldon, Edmund A. Brush, and George A. O'Keefe clerks; and Morris Jackson sergeant-at-arms.

== Members ==
Per the act of March 3, 1823, the nine members of the council were appointed by President James Monroe, chosen from the top 18 vote-earners in a general election. In addition to the appointed members listed below, the slate of names sent to the president included Louis Baufet, William Brown, Harry Conant, Laurent Durocher, Francois Navarre, Ebenezer Reed, Solomon Sibley, and Benjamin F. Stickney.

Members
County	Name	Party	Notes
Brown	Robert Irwin Jr.		
Macomb	Joseph Miller		Nominated December 16, 1824, to replace William Puthuff (deceased); confirmed by Senate December 21.
Macomb	John Stockton		
Michilimackinac	William H. Puthuff		Died July 17, 1824.
Monroe	Hubert Lacroix		
Monroe	Wolcott Lawrence		
Oakland	Stephen Mack		
Oakland	Roger Sprague		
St. Clair	Zephaniah W. Bunce		
Wayne	Abraham Edwards		
