= 1896 United States presidential election in Michigan =

- November 3, 1896

Nominee	William McKinley	William Jennings Bryan
Party	Republican	Populist
Alliance	-	Democratic
Home state	Ohio	Nebraska
Running mate	Garret Hobart	Thomas E. Watson
Electoral vote	14	0
Popular vote	293,582	237,268
Percentage	53.85%	43.52%
County results
McKinley
40–50%
50–60%
60–70%
70–80%
80–90%
Bryan
40–50%
50–60%
60–70%
Tie
40–50%
President before election
Grover Cleveland
Democratic
Elected President
William McKinley
Republican

The 1896 United States presidential election in Michigan took place on November 3, 1896. All contemporary 45 states were part of the 1896 United States presidential election. Voters chose 14 electors to the Electoral College, which selected the president and vice president.

Ever since the formation of the Republican party, Michigan had been a Republican-leaning state due to the Lower Peninsula’s strong history of settlement by anti-slavery Yankees, who after the end of Reconstruction continued to see the need for solid Republican voting to oppose the solidly Democratic Confederate and Border States. During the Third Party System, heavily Catholic and immigrant-settled Southeast Michigan would lean towards the Democratic Party, which was opposed to the moralistic pietism of Yankee Republicans.

In the 1892 election, aided by favorable demographic changes and a legislative change allocating electors by congressional district, the Democratic Party managed to carry five of Michigan's fourteen electoral votes, and also elect a Governor and a majority to the state legislature. However, the Panic of 1893 turned expectations or hopes of Michigan becoming a swing state rudely on its head, especially when incumbent President Cleveland stood firm, sending in troops to break the Pullman Strike. In the 1894 elections, only one Democrat maintained a seat in the state legislature, a loss of seventy seats compared to the 1890 elections.

In the wake of this decline, Cleveland decided not to run for a third term, and endorsed the National Democratic Party ticket of John M. Palmer. The Populist Party seized control of the Democratic Party and nominated former Nebraska Representative William Jennings Bryan. During his campaign, Bryan traveled through Michigan in the latter stages of his October Midwestern tour. Polls late in that month, covering all but three of Michigan's counties, showed Republican candidate William McKinley ahead of Bryan by almost three-to-one, which was an increase upon his margin in earlier polls. Another poll a little later was also certain Michigan would vote for McKinley.

Michigan ultimately voted for McKinley by a margin of 10.3 points, a much smaller margin than earlier polls, although a reduction was expected as some unpolled rural areas of the state had been believed to favor Bryan's free silver policy. His margin was an increase of five points upon what Benjamin Harrison had achieved over the state as a whole in 1892, though there were large variations. In the traditionally Democratic German Catholic areas, there was a large shift to McKinley due to Archbishop Ireland's opposition to free silver, In the heavily Methodist cabinet counties of Michiana, by contrast, Bryan gained substantially and was the first Democratic presidential candidate to carry Branch County, Calhoun County, Eaton County and Isabella County since Franklin Pierce in 1852.

Bryan would lose Michigan to McKinley again four years later and would later lose the state again in 1908 to William Howard Taft.

== Results ==
General Election Results
Party	Pledged to	Elector	Votes
Republican Party	William McKinley	Josiah C. Gray	293,582
Republican Party	William McKinley	Frank W. Gilchrist	293,526
Republican Party	William McKinley	Thomas B. Woodworth	293,337
Republican Party	William McKinley	Henry C. Potter	293,327
Republican Party	William McKinley	Rasmus Hansen	293,317
Republican Party	William McKinley	G. Willis Bement	293,306
Republican Party	William McKinley	Albert C. Hubbell	293,303
Republican Party	William McKinley	Sumner O. Bush	293,295
Republican Party	William McKinley	William O. Webster	293,260
Republican Party	William McKinley	John Atkinson	293,243
Republican Party	William McKinley	Harsen D. Smith	292,607
Republican Party	William McKinley	Digby B. Butler	292,524
Republican Party	William McKinley	Oscar J. R. Hanna	292,490
Republican Party	William McKinley	Lorenzo A. Barker	291,895
D.P.U.S. (Note: Democratic, People's, & Union Silver)	William Jennings Bryan	Robins B. Taylor	237,268
D.P.U.S.	William Jennings Bryan	John W. Ewing	237,256
D.P.U.S.	William Jennings Bryan	Joseph Houseman	237,254
D.P.U.S.	William Jennings Bryan	Henry Chamberlain	237,251
D.P.U.S.	William Jennings Bryan	Frank W. Hubbard	237,242
D.P.U.S.	William Jennings Bryan	Alva W. Nichols	237,241
D.P.U.S.	William Jennings Bryan	John Semer	237,206
D.P.U.S.	William Jennings Bryan	Henry N. Brevoort	237,205
D.P.U.S.	William Jennings Bryan	Spencer O. Fisher	237,203
D.P.U.S.	William Jennings Bryan	Amos O. White	237,039
D.P.U.S.	William Jennings Bryan	Henry R. Lovell	236,714
D.P.U.S.	William Jennings Bryan	James H. Pound	236,707
D.P.U.S.	William Jennings Bryan	Marcus T. Woodruff	236,273
D.P.U.S.	William Jennings Bryan	George H. House	236,052
National Democratic Party	John M. Palmer	Rufus W. Gillette	6,968
National Democratic Party	John M. Palmer	John W. Champlin	6,937
National Democratic Party	John M. Palmer	Samuel T. Douglas	6,930
National Democratic Party	John M. Palmer	John Strong	6,930
National Democratic Party	John M. Palmer	John E. Barnes	6,921
National Democratic Party	John M. Palmer	William T. Mitchell	6,921
National Democratic Party	John M. Palmer	Alexander V. Mann	6,920
National Democratic Party	John M. Palmer	Charles J. Pailthorp	6,916
National Democratic Party	John M. Palmer	Joseph Temple Titus	6,915
National Democratic Party	John M. Palmer	Alvah L. Sawyer	6,913
National Democratic Party	John M. Palmer	Edward W. Hudnutt	6,879
National Democratic Party	John M. Palmer	John Moore	6,863
National Democratic Party	John M. Palmer	Herbert H. Hamilton	6,831
National Democratic Party	John M. Palmer	John S. Farr	6,820
Prohibition Party	Joshua Levering	Samuel Dickie	5,025
Prohibition Party	Joshua Levering	John Russell	5,022
Prohibition Party	Joshua Levering	J. Lorenzo Beal	4,987
Prohibition Party	Joshua Levering	William C. Clemo	4,981
Prohibition Party	Joshua Levering	Charles Woodruff	4,973
Prohibition Party	Joshua Levering	David M. Woods	4,970
Prohibition Party	Joshua Levering	Jacob Vonzolenberg	4,969
Prohibition Party	Joshua Levering	William H. Hannaford	4,968
Prohibition Party	Joshua Levering	George W. Hall	4,967
Prohibition Party	Joshua Levering	Charles E. Yerge	4,962
Prohibition Party	Joshua Levering	William A. Taylor	4,950
Prohibition Party	Joshua Levering	Alexander S. Fair	4,939
Prohibition Party	Joshua Levering	Charles R. Evans	4,877
Prohibition Party	Joshua Levering	Sylvester H. Fields	4,551
National Prohibition	Charles E. Bentley	Wesley C. Richards	1,995
National Prohibition	Charles E. Bentley	Daniel J. Smith	1,821
National Prohibition	Charles E. Bentley	John Sagendorph	1,812
National Prohibition	Charles E. Bentley	Paul Butler	1,809
National Prohibition	Charles E. Bentley	Edward R. Clark	1,809
National Prohibition	Charles E. Bentley	William W. Hubbell	1,806
National Prohibition	Charles E. Bentley	John N. Conrad	1,805
National Prohibition	Charles E. Bentley	Edward A. Richards	1,805
National Prohibition	Charles E. Bentley	Abram Urmy	1,805
National Prohibition	Charles E. Bentley	Charles S. Bartlett	1,804
National Prohibition	Charles E. Bentley	William E. Clough	1,804
National Prohibition	Charles E. Bentley	Joseph A. Graley	1,800
National Prohibition	Charles E. Bentley	William G. Brown	1,786
National Prohibition	Charles E. Bentley	Trowbridge Johns	1,743
Socialist Labor Party	Charles H. Matchett	Henry Kleindienst	297
Socialist Labor Party	Charles H. Matchett	John Meyer	294
Socialist Labor Party	Charles H. Matchett	Bernhard Beyerchen	293
Socialist Labor Party	Charles H. Matchett	George M. Fringee	293
Socialist Labor Party	Charles H. Matchett	Albert Fritch	293
Socialist Labor Party	Charles H. Matchett	Charles Peterson	293
Socialist Labor Party	Charles H. Matchett	John D. Wolf	293
Socialist Labor Party	Charles H. Matchett	Alexander Black	292
Socialist Labor Party	Charles H. Matchett	Sheppard B. Cole	292
Socialist Labor Party	Charles H. Matchett	Conrad Hansen	292
Socialist Labor Party	Charles H. Matchett	Henry Lohse	292
Socialist Labor Party	Charles H. Matchett	Henry Markwardt	292
Socialist Labor Party	Charles H. Matchett	William Rheinhold	291
Socialist Labor Party	Charles H. Matchett	Henry Tailor	291
Write-in		Scattering	3
Votes cast (Note: Based on highest elector on each ticket)			545,138

=== Results by county ===
The results below are those for the highest elector on each ticket. The results listed in the 1897-1898 Michigan Manual are a "general average" for each ticket and thus not the "true" results. In particular, the average method results in McKinley and Bryan tying in Crawford County; however, using the actual results gives McKinley the victory by two votes because the highest Bryan elector (Taylor) received 348 votes there, not 350. (Note: Although every other elector besides Taylor on the D.P.U.S. ticket did receive 350 votes in Crawford County. All 14 Republican electors received 350 votes there as well.)

County	William McKinley Republican		William Jennings Bryan D.P.U.S.		John M. Palmer National Democratic		Joshua Levering Prohibition		Charles E. Bentley National		Margin		Total votes cast
County	#	%	#	%	#	%	#	%	#	%	#	%	Total votes cast
Alcona	742	70.87%	275	26.27%	22	2.10%	6	0.57%	2	0.19%	467	44.60%	1,047
Alger	801	58.42%	539	39.31%	26	1.90%	5	0.36%	0	0.00%	262	19.11%	1,371
Allegan	5,816	57.86%	3,937	39.17%	149	1.48%	94	0.94%	55	0.55%	1,879	18.69%	10,051
Alpena	1,775	51.01%	1,665	47.84%	26	0.75%	13	0.37%	1	0.03%	110	3.16%	3,480
Antrim	1,886	58.00%	1,228	37.76%	59	1.81%	39	1.20%	40	1.23%	658	20.23%	3,252
Arenac	616	37.58%	996	60.77%	18	1.10%	0	0.00%	9	0.55%	-380	-23.18%	1,639
Baraga	613	55.93%	459	41.88%	10	0.91%	12	1.09%	2	0.18%	154	14.05%	1,096
Barry	3,295	49.59%	3,158	47.53%	89	1.34%	52	0.78%	50	0.75%	137	2.06%	6,644
Bay	6,015	48.02%	6,289	50.21%	151	1.21%	63	0.50%	7	0.06%	-274	-2.19%	12,525
Benzie	1,370	60.35%	803	35.37%	30	1.32%	55	2.42%	12	0.53%	567	24.98%	2,270
Berrien	6,673	56.07%	4,794	40.28%	272	2.29%	117	0.98%	45	0.38%	1,879	15.79%	11,901
Branch	3,598	46.54%	3,977	51.44%	74	0.96%	40	0.52%	42	0.54%	-379	-4.90%	7,731
Calhoun	5,885	47.05%	6,202	49.58%	211	1.69%	180	1.44%	30	0.24%	-317	-2.53%	12,508
Cass	3,035	49.07%	3,012	48.70%	59	0.95%	64	1.03%	15	0.24%	23	0.37%	6,185
Charlevoix	1,652	61.03%	978	36.13%	24	0.89%	38	1.40%	15	0.55%	674	24.90%	2,707
Cheboygan	1,574	48.78%	1,616	50.08%	16	0.50%	12	0.37%	9	0.28%	-42	-1.30%	3,227
Chippewa	2,104	65.46%	1,002	31.18%	47	1.46%	58	1.80%	3	0.09%	1,102	34.29%	3,214
Clare	884	52.78%	723	43.16%	29	1.73%	12	0.72%	27	1.61%	161	9.61%	1,675
Clinton	3,478	48.91%	3,467	48.76%	65	0.91%	63	0.89%	38	0.53%	11	0.15%	7,111
Crawford (Note: Using the highest elector on each ticket results in McKinley carrying this county by two votes rather than a tie.)	350	49.79%	348	49.50%	3	0.43%	2	0.28%	0	0.00%	2	0.28%	703
Delta	2,774	67.79%	1,238	30.25%	65	1.59%	11	0.27%	4	0.10%	1,536	37.54%	4,092
Dickinson	2,609	80.62%	527	16.29%	56	1.73%	41	1.27%	3	0.09%	2,082	64.34%	3,236
Eaton	4,271	46.95%	4,633	50.93%	108	1.19%	66	0.73%	18	0.20%	-362	-3.98%	9,096
Emmet	1,727	53.48%	1,337	41.41%	48	1.49%	69	2.14%	48	1.49%	390	12.08%	3,229
Genesee	5,640	52.00%	4,915	45.32%	102	0.94%	127	1.17%	62	0.57%	725	6.68%	10,846
Gladwin	748	67.09%	323	28.97%	28	2.51%	13	1.17%	3	0.27%	425	38.12%	1,115
Gogebic	1,983	68.36%	838	28.89%	48	1.65%	26	0.90%	6	0.21%	1,145	39.47%	2,901
Grand Traverse	2,533	57.19%	1,745	39.40%	71	1.60%	72	1.63%	8	0.18%	788	17.79%	4,429
Gratiot	3,380	44.95%	3,972	52.82%	72	0.96%	60	0.80%	36	0.48%	-592	-7.87%	7,520
Hillsdale	4,566	52.03%	3,988	45.44%	91	1.04%	78	0.89%	53	0.60%	578	6.59%	8,776
Houghton	6,139	71.84%	1,996	23.36%	178	2.08%	225	2.63%	7	0.08%	4,143	48.48%	8,545
Huron	3,396	53.64%	2,808	44.35%	88	1.39%	30	0.47%	9	0.14%	588	9.29%	6,331
Ingham	4,966	45.46%	5,691	52.10%	82	0.75%	111	1.02%	74	0.68%	-725	-6.64%	10,924
Ionia	4,589	48.30%	4,757	50.07%	65	0.68%	59	0.62%	31	0.33%	-168	-1.77%	9,501
Iosco	1,468	60.24%	912	37.42%	37	1.52%	17	0.70%	3	0.12%	556	22.81%	2,437
Iron	1,051	79.68%	237	17.97%	24	1.82%	0	0.00%	7	0.53%	814	61.71%	1,319
Isabella	2,425	46.72%	2,677	51.58%	24	0.46%	40	0.77%	24	0.46%	-252	-4.86%	5,190
Jackson	6,209	47.42%	6,515	49.76%	127	0.97%	149	1.14%	94	0.72%	-306	-2.34%	13,094
Kalamazoo	5,892	51.11%	5,435	47.15%	83	0.72%	83	0.72%	34	0.29%	457	3.96%	11,527
Kalkaska	940	66.34%	422	29.78%	27	1.91%	18	1.27%	10	0.71%	518	36.56%	1,417
Kent	17,053	54.32%	13,583	43.27%	318	1.01%	397	1.26%	40	0.13%	3,470	11.05%	31,391
Keweenaw	411	88.96%	45	9.74%	5	1.08%	1	0.22%	0	0.00%	366	79.22%	462
Lake	888	60.57%	548	37.38%	20	1.36%	8	0.55%	2	0.14%	340	23.19%	1,466
Lapeer	3,810	53.59%	3,067	43.14%	105	1.48%	101	1.42%	26	0.37%	743	10.45%	7,109
Leelanau	1,403	64.24%	691	31.64%	53	2.43%	33	1.51%	4	0.18%	712	32.60%	2,184
Lenawee	6,861	50.86%	6,301	46.71%	143	1.06%	148	1.10%	37	0.27%	560	4.15%	13,490
Livingston	2,894	47.66%	2,994	49.31%	76	1.25%	73	1.20%	35	0.58%	-100	-1.65%	6,072
Luce	358	57.01%	236	37.58%	16	2.55%	17	2.71%	1	0.16%	122	19.43%	628
Mackinac	806	48.64%	805	48.58%	36	2.17%	9	0.54%	1	0.06%	1	0.06%	1,657
Macomb	4,153	53.19%	3,401	43.56%	157	2.01%	72	0.92%	25	0.32%	752	9.63%	7,808
Manistee	2,697	50.64%	2,487	46.70%	94	1.76%	35	0.66%	13	0.24%	210	3.94%	5,326
Marquette	5,110	70.09%	1,981	27.17%	79	1.08%	100	1.37%	21	0.29%	3,129	42.92%	7,291
Mason	2,176	56.23%	1,580	40.83%	67	1.73%	32	0.83%	15	0.39%	596	15.40%	3,870
Mecosta	2,887	57.79%	1,975	39.53%	73	1.46%	49	0.98%	12	0.24%	912	18.25%	4,996
Menominee	3,105	66.35%	1,500	32.05%	48	1.03%	22	0.47%	5	0.11%	1,605	34.29%	4,680
Midland	1,524	48.81%	1,507	48.27%	48	1.54%	34	1.09%	9	0.29%	17	0.54%	3,122
Missaukee	899	55.09%	687	42.10%	14	0.86%	27	1.65%	5	0.31%	212	12.99%	1,632
Monroe	4,053	48.10%	4,212	49.98%	74	0.88%	51	0.61%	37	0.44%	-159	-1.89%	8,427
Montcalm	4,523	54.24%	3,650	43.77%	88	1.06%	60	0.72%	18	0.22%	873	10.47%	8,339
Montmorency	479	58.56%	330	40.34%	2	0.24%	6	0.73%	1	0.12%	149	18.22%	818
Muskegon	4,682	58.80%	3,109	39.05%	82	1.03%	71	0.89%	18	0.23%	1,573	19.76%	7,962
Newaygo	2,649	56.52%	1,943	41.46%	30	0.64%	44	0.94%	21	0.45%	706	15.06%	4,687
Oakland (Note: The 1897-1898 Michigan Manual (and later sources that cite it) lists 1,070 Scattering votes in this county. These votes were, in fact, recorded for "M. T. Woodruff" and thus intended for Marcus T. Woodruff, an elector on the D.P.U.S. ticket. Therefore, there were not actually any additional votes in Oakland County.)	5,840	49.86%	5,348	45.66%	180	1.54%	129	1.10%	215	1.84%	492	4.20%	11,712
Oceana	2,534	58.09%	1,636	37.51%	61	1.40%	113	2.59%	18	0.41%	898	20.59%	4,362
Ogemaw	793	56.64%	560	40.00%	24	1.71%	18	1.29%	5	0.36%	233	16.64%	1,400
Ontonagon	758	62.80%	416	34.47%	25	2.07%	7	0.58%	1	0.08%	342	28.33%	1,207
Osceola	2,270	62.88%	1,178	32.63%	69	1.91%	52	1.44%	41	1.14%	1,092	30.25%	3,610
Oscoda	308	80.84%	63	16.54%	9	2.36%	1	0.26%	0	0.00%	245	64.30%	381
Otsego	859	59.41%	560	38.73%	14	0.97%	10	0.69%	3	0.21%	299	20.68%	1,446
Ottawa	5,202	58.10%	3,549	39.64%	114	1.27%	67	0.75%	22	0.25%	1,653	18.46%	8,954
Presque Isle	764	66.15%	371	32.12%	10	0.87%	8	0.69%	2	0.17%	393	34.03%	1,155
Roscommon	282	65.43%	141	32.71%	3	0.70%	4	0.93%	1	0.23%	141	32.71%	431
Saginaw	8,362	47.92%	8,791	50.38%	182	1.04%	75	0.43%	39	0.22%	-429	-2.46%	17,449
Sanilac	3,631	51.69%	3,156	44.93%	90	1.28%	93	1.32%	54	0.77%	475	6.76%	7,024
Schoolcraft	975	62.86%	549	35.40%	13	0.84%	13	0.84%	1	0.06%	426	27.47%	1,551
Shiawassee	4,655	50.47%	4,303	46.65%	139	1.51%	87	0.94%	40	0.43%	352	3.82%	9,224
St. Clair	7,164	56.87%	5,128	40.70%	162	1.29%	98	0.78%	46	0.37%	2,036	16.16%	12,598
St. Joseph	3,185	43.78%	3,967	54.53%	51	0.70%	59	0.81%	13	0.18%	-782	-10.75%	7,275
Tuscola	4,275	53.01%	3,565	44.21%	87	1.08%	88	1.09%	49	0.61%	710	8.80%	8,064
Van Buren	4,506	51.89%	3,981	45.85%	93	1.07%	73	0.84%	30	0.35%	525	6.05%	8,683
Washtenaw	5,677	49.75%	5,349	46.88%	214	1.88%	110	0.96%	60	0.53%	328	2.87%	11,410
Wayne	36,617	56.83%	26,233	40.72%	960	1.49%	261	0.41%	59	0.09%	10,384	16.12%	64,430 (Note: Includes 297 votes for Matchett and 3 Scattering votes. All Socialist Labor votes were cast in Wayne County.)
Wexford	2,036	58.29%	1,358	38.88%	36	1.03%	49	1.40%	14	0.40%	678	19.41%	3,493
Totals	293,582	53.85%	237,268	43.52%	6,968	1.28%	5,025	0.92%	1,995	0.37%	56,314	10.33%	545,138

==== Counties that flipped from Democratic to Republican ====
- Alpena
- Barry
- Clare
- Crawford
- Emmet
- Huron
- Mackinac
- Macomb
- Manistee
- Montmorency
- Oakland
- Ontonagon
- Otsego
- Presque Isle
- Roscommon
- Schoolcraft
- Washtenaw
- Wayne

==== Counties that flipped from Republican to Democratic ====
- Arenac
- Branch
- Calhoun
- Eaton
- Gratiot
- Ingham
- Ionia
- Isabella
- Jackson
- Livingston
- St. Joseph

== See also ==
- United States presidential elections in Michigan
