= 1852 United States presidential election in Michigan =

- November 2, 1852

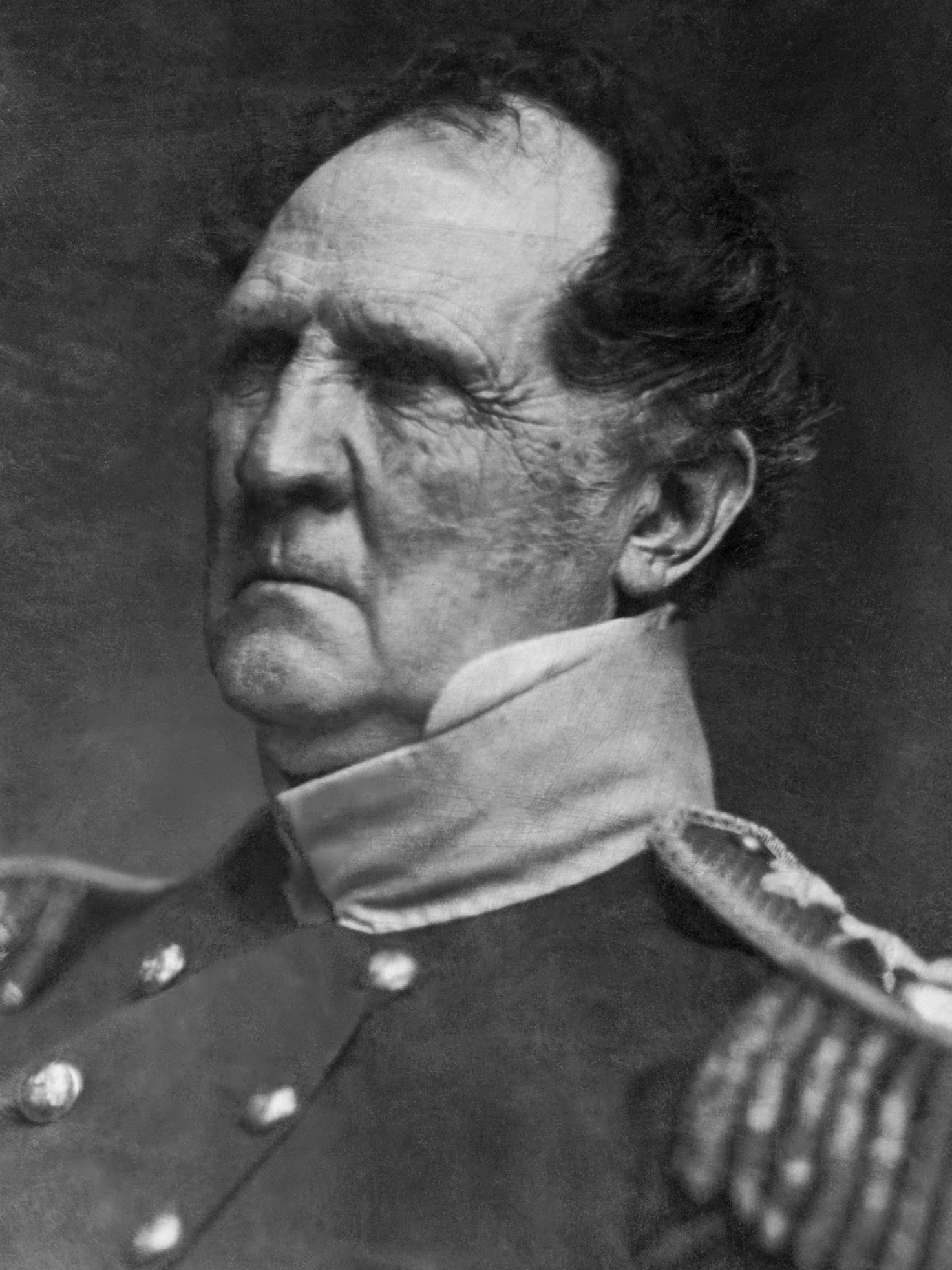

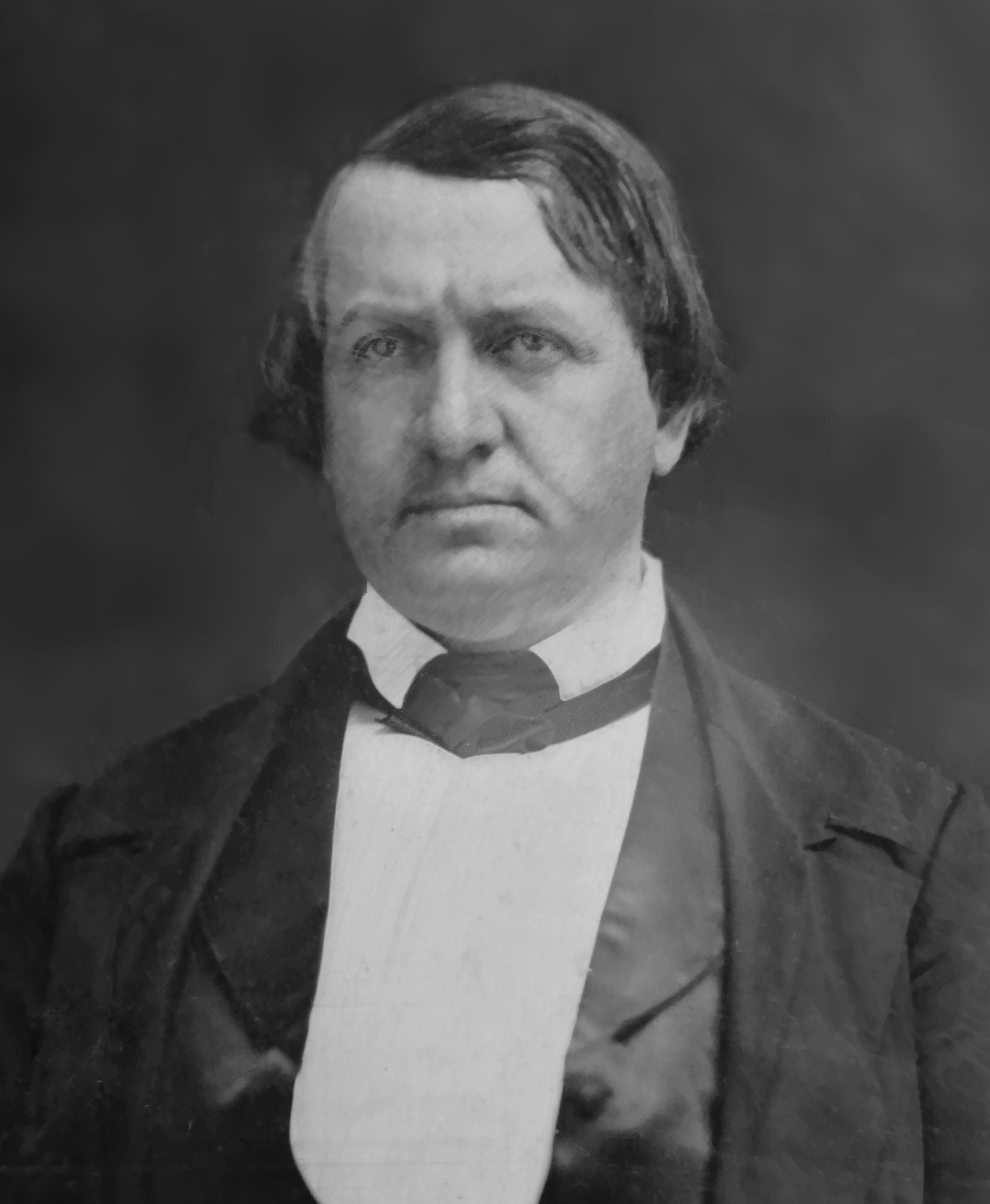
Nominee	Franklin Pierce	Winfield Scott	John P. Hale
Party	Democratic	Whig	Free Soil
Home state	New Hampshire	New Jersey	New Hampshire
Running mate	William R. King	William Alexander Graham	George W. Julian
Electoral vote	6	0	0
Popular vote	41,842	33,860	7,237
Percentage	50.42%	40.80%	8.72%
County results
Pierce
40–50%
50–60%
60–70%
70–80%
80–90%
Scott
40–50%
President before election
Millard Fillmore
Whig
Elected President
Franklin Pierce
Democratic

The 1852 United States presidential election in Michigan took place on November 2, 1852, as part of the 1852 United States presidential election. Voters chose six representatives, or electors to the Electoral College, who voted for President and Vice President.

Michigan voted for the Democratic candidate, Franklin Pierce, over Whig candidate Winfield Scott and Free Soil candidate John P. Hale. Pierce won Michigan by a margin of 9.62%.

As of the 2024 presidential election, this is the last and only time Sanilac County voted for a Democratic presidential candidate. It would also be the last time until 1964 that Allegan County, Hillsdale County and Lapeer County would support a Democratic presidential candidate. This was also the last time Michigan sent a full slate (or even a majority) of Democratic electors to the Electoral College until Franklin D. Roosevelt in 1932, although it did send five Grover Cleveland electors in 1892.

== Results ==
General Election Results
Party	Pledged to	Elector	Votes
Democratic Party	Franklin Pierce	John S. Barry	41,842
Democratic Party	Franklin Pierce	Abraham Edwards	41,841
Democratic Party	Franklin Pierce	William McCauley	41,839
Democratic Party	Franklin Pierce	Daniel J. Campau	41,835
Democratic Party	Franklin Pierce	John Stockton	41,800
Democratic Party	Franklin Pierce	Salmon Sharp	41,284
Whig Party	Winfield Scott	Alexander H. Morrison	33,860
Whig Party	Winfield Scott	John Owen	33,859
Whig Party	Winfield Scott	George A. Coe	33,858
Whig Party	Winfield Scott	Townsend E. Gidley	33,849
Whig Party	Winfield Scott	Daniel S. Bacon	33,791
Whig Party	Winfield Scott	William M. Thompson	33,677
Free Soil Party	John P. Hale	Chester Gurney	7,237
Free Soil Party	John P. Hale	Horace Hallock	7,094
Free Soil Party	John P. Hale	Lyman B. Treadwell	6,866
Free Soil Party	John P. Hale	Dewitt C. Leach	6,830
Free Soil Party	John P. Hale	Nathan M. Thomas	6,795
Free Soil Party	John P. Hale	Robert R. Beecher	5,911
Write-in		Scattering	42
Votes cast (Note: Based on highest elector on each ticket)			82,981

=== Results by county ===
County	Franklin Pierce Democratic		Winfield Scott Whig		John P. Hale Free Soil		Margin		Total votes cast
County	#	%	#	%	#	%	#	%	Total votes cast
Allegan	582	48.46%	547	45.55%	66	5.50%	35	2.91%	1,201 (Note: Includes 6 Scattering votes)
Barry	652	52.71%	478	38.64%	107	8.65%	174	14.07%	1,237
Berrien	1,234	53.89%	1,015	44.32%	41	1.79%	219	9.56%	2,290
Branch	1,380	51.90%	1,077	40.50%	202	7.60%	303	11.40%	2,659
Calhoun	1,824	45.06%	1,784	44.07%	440	10.87%	40	0.99%	4,048
Cass	984	47.61%	988	47.80%	95	4.60%	-4	-0.19%	2,067
Clinton	437	41.54%	469	44.58%	146	13.88%	-32	-3.04%	1,052
Eaton	786	46.84%	637	37.96%	225	13.41%	149	8.88%	1,678 (Note: Includes 30 Scattering votes)
Genesee	1,145	42.93%	1,221	45.78%	301	11.29%	-76	-2.85%	2,667
Hillsdale	1,596	46.89%	1,417	41.63%	391	11.49%	179	5.26%	3,404
Ingham	929	50.35%	786	42.60%	128	6.94%	143	7.75%	1,845 (Note: Includes 2 Scattering votes)
Ionia	864	47.34%	659	36.11%	302	16.55%	205	11.23%	1,825
Jackson	1,840	45.43%	1,726	42.62%	484	11.95%	114	2.81%	4,050
Kalamazoo	1,257	41.32%	1,374	45.17%	411	13.51%	-117	-3.85%	3,042
Kent	1,519	52.18%	1,226	42.12%	166	5.70%	293	10.07%	2,911
Lapeer	819	51.87%	618	39.14%	142	8.99%	201	12.73%	1,579
Lenawee	2,857	48.29%	2,418	40.87%	640	10.82%	439	7.42%	5,916 (Note: Includes 1 Scattering vote)
Livingston	1,419	57.15%	931	37.49%	133	5.36%	488	19.65%	2,483
Mackinac	292	88.48%	38	11.52%	0	0.00%	254	76.97%	330
Macomb	1,634	51.01%	1,060	33.09%	509	15.89%	574	17.92%	3,203
Monroe	1,582	55.26%	1,112	38.84%	169	5.90%	470	16.42%	2,863
Montcalm	156	55.32%	120	42.55%	6	2.13%	36	12.77%	282
Newaygo	104	72.22%	40	27.78%	0	0.00%	64	44.44%	144
Oakland	3,178	52.05%	2,376	38.91%	552	9.04%	802	13.13%	6,106
Ottawa	756	64.18%	363	30.81%	59	5.01%	393	33.36%	1,178
Saginaw	694	61.20%	367	32.36%	73	6.44%	327	28.84%	1,134
Sanilac	252	69.81%	109	30.19%	0	0.00%	143	39.61%	361
Shiawassee	584	50.56%	519	44.94%	52	4.50%	65	5.63%	1,155
St. Clair	1,110	55.09%	852	42.28%	53	2.63%	258	12.80%	2,015
St. Joseph	1,259	47.07%	1,164	43.51%	252	9.42%	95	3.55%	2,675
Tuscola	62	35.23%	80	45.45%	34	19.32%	-18	-10.23%	176
Van Buren	771	52.31%	613	41.59%	87	5.90%	158	10.72%	1,474 (Note: Includes 3 Scattering votes)
Washtenaw	2,604	47.51%	2,274	41.49%	603	11.00%	330	6.02%	5,481
Wayne	4,680	55.38%	3,402	40.26%	368	4.36%	1,278	15.12%	8,450
Total	41,842	50.42%	33,860	40.80%	7,237	8.72%	7,982	9.62%	82,981

==== Counties that flipped from Democratic to Whig ====
- Cass
- Clinton

== See also ==
- United States presidential elections in Michigan
