= Joseph Miller (Michigan politician) =

American politician

Joseph Miller was an American pioneer and politician who served on the Michigan Territorial Council in 1825.

Miller was one of the first settlers of Shelby Township in Macomb County, Michigan.

When the government of the Territory of Michigan was restructured to include a new legislative council, Miller was one of the top 18 vote-earners in a general election. Those names were sent to President James Monroe, but Miller was not among the nine chosen to form the First Michigan Territorial Council. Following the death of council member William H. Puthuff during the council's session in 1824, Miller was proposed as a replacement, since he had received the highest vote total of the remaining nine men. He was nominated by Monroe on December 16, 1824, and confirmed by the Senate on December 21. He was seated on January 31, 1825.
