= Roger Sprague =

American businessman and politician

Personal details
- Born: 1769 Lebanon, Connecticut, U.S.
- Died: 1848 (aged 78–79)

Roger Sprague (1769 – July 1848) was an American businessman and politician in New York and the Territory of Michigan. He served in the New York State Assembly and on the Michigan Territorial Council.

== Biography ==
Roger Sprague was born in Lebanon, Connecticut, in 1769. He was the son of Abigail Hill and Silas Sprague, who had seven other children together in addition to seven children from Silas Sprague's first marriage. Silas Sprague moved his family to Great Barrington, Massachusetts, in 1772, and attained the rank of captain in the Continental Army.

At the age of 22, Roger Sprague walked to western New York state and settled in the town of East Bloomfield, where he, his father, and three brothers were among the first settlers. He served as sheriff of Ontario County, New York, for seven years; the county encompassed most of western New York at the time. The auction for the Holland Purchase was held at his house, with Aaron Burr in attendance. He also served as a judge in the Ontario County courts and was a member of the state assembly in 1816.

In 1820, Sprague visited Michigan and purchased property in Avon Township; he moved his family there in 1821.

When the government of the Territory of Michigan was restructured to include a new legislative council, Sprague was one of the top 18 vote-earners in a general election. Those names were sent to President James Monroe, who selected nine, including Sprague, to form the First Michigan Territorial Council in 1824. He served two years, then was elected again to a term in 1832 representing Washtenaw County on the fifth council.

Sprague died in July 1848.

=== Family ===
Sprague married Althea Baughton (or Boughton) of West Stockbridge, Massachusetts, and they had eight children, among them Walter, Frederick, Roger Jr, George Washington, Asahel, Thomas, and Althea.
