= 1892 United States presidential election in Michigan =

- November 8, 1892
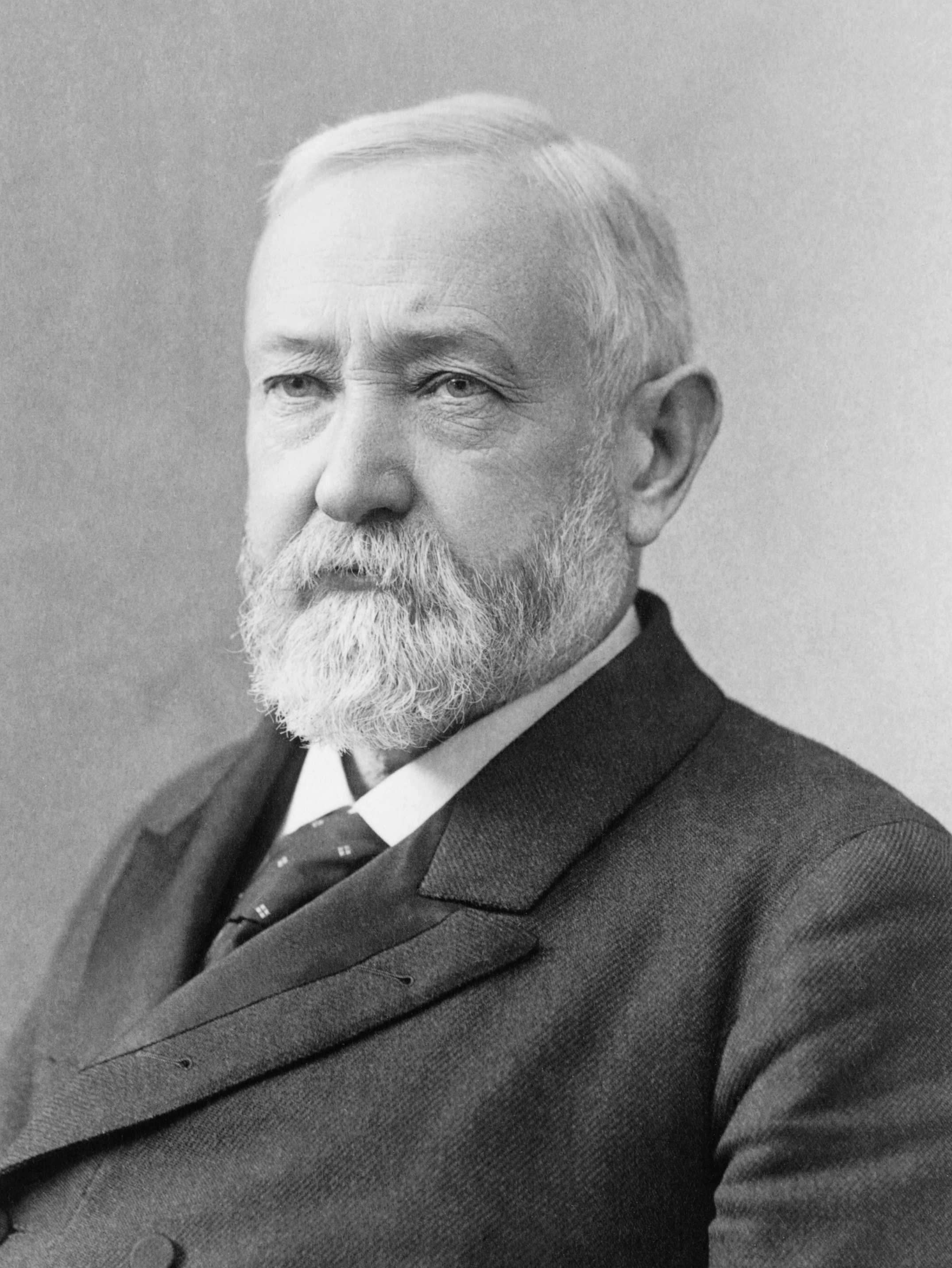

Nominee	Benjamin Harrison	Grover Cleveland
Party	Republican	Democratic
Home state	Indiana	New York
Running mate	Whitelaw Reid	Adlai Stevenson I
Electoral vote	9	5
Popular vote	222,708	202,296
Percentage	47.72%	43.34%

Harrison
40–50%
50–60%
60–70%
Cleveland
40–50%
50–60%
60–70%
Weaver
30–40%
President before election
Benjamin Harrison
Republican
Elected President
Grover Cleveland
Democratic

The 1892 United States presidential election in Michigan took place on November 8, 1892. All contemporary 44 states were part of the 1892 United States presidential election. Voters chose 14 electors to the Electoral College, which selected the president and vice president.

Uniquely, this remains the only presidential election where Michigan used the congressional district method of distributing electoral votes rather than the traditional election of each elector by the state as a whole. The switch was made by the newly elected 1890 Democratic legislature, which had gained control of the state for the first time since before the Civil War. The change was an attempt at boosting Democratic candidate Grover Cleveland's chances of winning a second, nonconsecutive term, who had run in the previous election and won the popular vote, but lost in the electoral college. Controversial among Republicans, the party fought all the way to the Supreme Court in efforts to prevent it, the Court ruling in McPherson v. Blacker that allocating electoral votes this way was constitutional. The split ultimately had no effect in Cleveland's victory, and the system was quickly repealed when Republicans regained control after the election. This is the only instance of Michigan splitting its electoral votes among multiple candidates. A law later passed in 1954 that prohibits faithless electors prevents a similar occurrence, barring a return to the district method.

Michigan was won by the Republican nominees: incumbent President Benjamin Harrison of Indiana and his running mate Whitelaw Reid of New York. The pair received nine of the state's electoral votes, while the Democratic ticket earned five.

Cleveland became the first Democratic presidential candidate since Franklin Pierce in 1852 to get electoral votes from Michigan, although the state wouldn't send a full slate of Democratic electors to the Electoral College until Franklin D. Roosevelt won it in 1932.

== Statewide results ==
Michigan was divided into two at large districts that chose one elector each. Cleveland won the eastern district and Harrison won the western district. Both districts also separately elected alternate presidential electors.

=== At Large districts ===
1892 United States presidential election in Michigan - Eastern District
Party	Candidate	Votes	%
Democratic	George H. Durand	108,956	46.90%
Republican	William McPherson Jr.	107,418	46.24%
Prohibition	Henry A. Reynolds	8,633	3.72%
Populist	William R. Alger	7,169	3.09%
Independent	Scattering	61 (Note: 54 votes for Archibald McDonell and 7 votes for Charles W. Deland (misspelling of Charles V. De Land). McDonell and De Land were the respective Republican and Democratic candidates for alternate elector in this district.)	0.03%
Independent	Blank	73	0.03%
Total votes		232,310	100.00%
Plurality		1,538	0.66%

1892 United States presidential election in Michigan - Western District
Party	Candidate	Votes	%
Republican	Jay A. Hubbell	115,290	49.18%
Democratic	John Power	93,340	39.82%
Populist	Oscar F. Bean	12,762	5.44%
Prohibition	Samuel Dickie	12,224	5.21%
Independent	Scattering	791 (Note: 743 votes for William R. Alger, 29 votes for Trowbridge Johns, and 19 votes for Alsor F. Bean (apparent misspelling of Oscar F. Bean). Alger was the Populist nominee in the Eastern District and Johns was the Prohibition nominee in the 12th congressional district.)	0.34%
Total votes		234,407	100.00%
Plurality		21,950	9.36%

The statewide results for the presidential candidates themselves are the combined results for their respective electors in the eastern and western districts. Note, however, that the full statewide results had no effect on the outcome; all electors were chosen individually. Each voter chose only two of the state's 14 electors: one for their respective at large district and one for their respective congressional district (see below).

1892 United States presidential election in Michigan
Party	Candidate	Votes	%
Republican	Benjamin Harrison (incumbent)	222,708	47.72%
Democratic	Grover Cleveland	202,296	43.34%
Prohibition	John Bidwell	20,857	4.47%
Populist	James B. Weaver	19,931	4.27%
Independent	Scattering	852	0.18%
Independent	Blank	73	0.02%
Total votes		466,717	100.00%
Plurality		20,412	4.37%

=== Results by county ===
County	Benjamin Harrison Republican		Grover Cleveland Democratic		John Bidwell Prohibition		James B. Weaver Populist		Margin		Total votes cast
County	#	%	#	%	#	%	#	%	#	%	Total votes cast
Alcona	556	57.32%	380	39.18%	29	2.99%	5	0.52%	176	18.14%	970
Alger	160	50.31%	156	49.06%	2	0.63%	0	0.00%	4	1.26%	318
Allegan	4,283	50.96%	3,207	38.16%	544	6.47%	371	4.41%	1,076	12.80%	8,405
Alpena	1,526	49.11%	1,536	49.44%	26	0.84%	19	0.61%	-10	-0.32%	3,107
Antrim	1,140	52.17%	814	37.25%	164	7.51%	67	3.07%	326	14.92%	2,185
Arenac	322	27.81%	373	32.21%	26	2.25%	437	37.74%	-64 (Note: In this county where Weaver ran ahead of Harrison and also Cleveland, margin given is Cleveland vote minus Weaver vote and percentage margin Cleveland percentage minus Weaver percentage.)	-5.53%	1,158
Baraga	375	36.76%	630	61.76%	12	1.18%	3	0.29%	-255	-25.00%	1,020
Barry	2,854	49.20%	1,800	31.03%	297	5.12%	850	14.65%	1,054	18.17%	5,801
Bay	4,587	42.96%	5,714	53.51%	187	1.75%	190	1.78%	-1,127	-10.55%	10,678
Benzie	774	52.47%	498	33.76%	101	6.85%	102	6.92%	276	18.71%	1,475
Berrien	4,979	48.55%	4,716	45.98%	426	4.15%	135	1.32%	263	2.56%	10,256
Branch	3,271	49.68%	2,161	32.82%	426	6.47%	726	11.03%	1,110	16.86%	6,584
Calhoun	5,077	48.10%	4,150	39.31%	710	6.73%	619	5.86%	927	8.78%	10,556
Cass	2,731	47.71%	2,424	42.35%	180	3.14%	389	6.80%	307	5.36%	5,724
Charlevoix	1,101	53.14%	688	33.20%	141	6.81%	142	6.85%	413	19.93%	2,072
Cheboygan	1,094	44.27%	1,224	49.53%	74	2.99%	79	3.20%	-130	-5.26%	2,471
Chippewa	1,247	52.33%	1,083	45.45%	35	1.47%	18	0.76%	164	6.88%	2,383
Clare	719	41.90%	811	47.26%	167	9.73%	0	0.00%	-92	-5.36%	1,716 (Note: Includes 19 Scattering votes.)
Clinton	3,133	48.42%	2,756	42.60%	258	3.99%	323	4.99%	377	5.83%	6,470
Crawford	300	48.62%	306	49.59%	3	0.49%	8	1.30%	-6	-0.97%	617
Delta	1,769	54.30%	1,412	43.34%	40	1.23%	37	1.14%	357	10.96%	3,258
Dickinson	1,606	51.05%	1,255	39.89%	255	8.11%	30	0.95%	351	11.16%	3,146
Eaton	3,788	48.24%	2,837	36.13%	498	6.34%	730	9.30%	951	12.11%	7,853
Emmet	1,015	46.28%	1,059	48.29%	102	4.65%	17	0.78%	-44	-2.01%	2,193
Genesee	4,785	50.14%	3,712	38.90%	590	6.18%	456	4.78%	1,073	11.24%	9,543
Gladwin	531	60.82%	325	37.23%	13	1.49%	4	0.46%	206	23.60%	873
Gogebic	2,344	57.25%	1,615	39.45%	116	2.83%	19	0.46%	729	17.81%	4,094
Grand Traverse	1,734	54.70%	924	29.15%	185	5.84%	327	10.32%	810	25.55%	3,170
Gratiot	3,037	48.83%	1,661	26.70%	256	4.12%	1,266	20.35%	1,376	22.12%	6,220
Hillsdale	4,119	53.65%	2,613	34.03%	486	6.33%	460	5.99%	1,506	19.61%	7,678
Houghton	3,316	45.84%	2,607	36.04%	568	7.85%	0	0.00%	709	9.80%	7,234 (Note: Includes 743 Scattering votes.)
Huron	1,692	35.35%	2,222	46.42%	175	3.66%	698	14.58%	-530	-11.07%	4,787
Ingham	4,341	44.08%	4,061	41.23%	499	5.07%	948	9.63%	280	2.84%	9,849
Ionia	4,288	49.45%	3,779	43.58%	379	4.37%	225	2.59%	509	5.87%	8,671
Iosco	1,393	49.57%	1,336	47.54%	58	2.06%	23	0.82%	57	2.03%	2,810
Iron	918	59.26%	587	37.90%	0	0.00%	15	0.97%	331	21.37%	1,549 (Note: Includes 29 Scattering votes.)
Isabella	1,859	45.42%	1,762	43.05%	153	3.74%	319	7.79%	97	2.37%	4,093
Jackson	5,130	45.02%	5,005	43.92%	571	5.01%	690	6.05%	125	1.10%	11,396
Kalamazoo	4,968	50.56%	4,018	40.90%	449	4.57%	390	3.97%	950	9.67%	9,825
Kalkaska	717	59.45%	389	32.26%	60	4.98%	40	3.32%	328	27.20%	1,206
Kent	12,388	46.31%	11,533	43.11%	1,411	5.27%	1,418	5.30%	855	3.20%	26,750
Keweenaw	400	65.36%	202	33.01%	5	0.82%	5	0.82%	198	32.35%	612
Lake	648	47.79%	610	44.99%	63	4.65%	35	2.58%	38	2.80%	1,356
Lapeer	3,126	49.11%	2,698	42.39%	313	4.92%	228	3.58%	428	6.72%	6,365
Leelanau	769	53.63%	492	34.31%	44	3.07%	129	9.00%	277	19.32%	1,434
Lenawee	5,833	46.86%	5,592	44.92%	910	7.31%	114	0.92%	241	1.94%	12,449
Livingston	2,447	43.76%	2,385	42.65%	365	6.53%	395	7.06%	62	1.11%	5,592
Luce	234	55.45%	160	37.91%	25	5.92%	3	0.71%	74	17.54%	422
Mackinac	478	35.41%	855	63.33%	9	0.67%	8	0.59%	-377	-27.93%	1,350
Macomb	2,788	41.50%	3,584	53.35%	290	4.32%	56	0.83%	-796	-11.85%	6,718
Manistee	1,481	35.42%	2,310	55.25%	231	5.52%	159	3.80%	-829	-19.83%	4,181
Manitou	5	3.36%	144	96.64%	0	0.00%	0	0.00%	-139	-93.29%	149
Marquette	3,874	53.03%	2,850	39.01%	536	7.34%	45	0.62%	1,024	14.02%	7,305
Mason	1,426	45.85%	1,383	44.47%	258	8.30%	43	1.38%	43	1.38%	3,110
Mecosta	1,970	51.76%	1,484	38.99%	220	5.78%	132	3.47%	486	12.77%	3,806
Menominee	1,853	48.43%	1,801	47.07%	134	3.50%	38	0.99%	52	1.36%	3,826
Midland	1,069	46.16%	815	35.19%	118	5.09%	314	13.56%	254	10.97%	2,316
Missaukee	665	48.61%	622	45.47%	61	4.46%	20	1.46%	43	3.14%	1,368
Monroe	2,914	41.50%	3,769	53.68%	224	3.19%	114	1.62%	-855	-12.18%	7,021
Montcalm	3,623	53.31%	2,205	32.45%	265	3.90%	703	10.34%	1,418	20.87%	6,796
Montmorency	246	47.67%	255	49.42%	10	1.94%	5	0.97%	-9	-1.74%	516
Muskegon	3,830	49.76%	3,301	42.89%	322	4.18%	244	3.17%	529	6.87%	7,697
Newaygo	2,106	51.02%	1,531	37.09%	286	6.93%	205	4.97%	575	13.93%	4,128
Oakland	4,763	44.98%	4,925	46.51%	728	6.87%	174	1.64%	-162	-1.53%	10,590
Oceana	1,635	47.38%	1,416	41.03%	312	9.04%	88	2.55%	219	6.35%	3,451
Ogemaw	594	50.64%	514	43.82%	26	2.22%	39	3.32%	80	6.82%	1,173
Ontonagon	678	38.68%	1,041	59.38%	19	1.08%	15	0.86%	-363	-20.71%	1,753
Osceola	1,601	51.13%	1,092	34.88%	310	9.90%	128	4.09%	509	16.26%	3,131
Oscoda	273	59.09%	180	38.96%	5	1.08%	4	0.87%	93	20.13%	462
Otsego	525	47.60%	531	48.14%	32	2.90%	15	1.36%	-6	-0.54%	1,103
Ottawa	3,643	50.82%	2,996	41.79%	180	2.51%	350	4.88%	647	9.02%	7,169
Presque Isle	290	34.77%	471	56.47%	7	0.84%	5	0.60%	-181	-21.70%	834 (Note: Includes 61 Scattering votes.)
Roscommon	239	44.26%	286	52.96%	9	1.67%	6	1.11%	-47	-8.70%	540
Saginaw	6,737	44.37%	7,601	50.07%	254	1.67%	590	3.89%	-864	-5.69%	15,182
Sanilac	2,494	54.34%	1,730	37.69%	288	6.27%	78	1.70%	764	16.64%	4,590
Schoolcraft	570	41.79%	650	47.65%	101	7.40%	43	3.15%	-80	-5.87%	1,364
Shiawassee	3,619	47.79%	2,994	39.54%	677	8.94%	283 (Note: The 1893-1894 Michigan Manual contains a typo for Alger in this county. The correct figure is 283, not 383.)	3.74%	625	8.25%	7,573
St. Clair	5,371	48.82%	5,248	47.70%	228	2.07%	81	0.74%	123	1.12%	11,001 (Note: Includes 73 Blank votes.)
St. Joseph	2,824	43.93%	2,441	37.97%	185	2.88%	978	15.21%	383	5.96%	6,428
Tuscola	3,201	49.42%	2,667	41.18%	397	6.13%	212	3.27%	534	8.24%	6,477
Van Buren	3,788	54.05%	2,182	31.14%	403	5.75%	635	9.06%	1,606	22.92%	7,008
Washtenaw	4,362	41.99%	5,508	53.02%	448	4.31%	70	0.67%	-1,146	-11.03%	10,388
Wayne	26,361	47.81%	27,580	50.02%	702	1.27%	495	0.90%	-1,219	-2.21%	55,138
Wexford	1,388	49.91%	1,156	41.57%	185	6.65%	52	1.87%	232	8.34%	2,781
Totals	222,708	47.72%	202,296 (Note: The county figures add up to 202,396; the error is in the eastern district with Durand's county results adding up to 109,056 rather than the stated 108,956.)	43.34%	20,857	4.47%	19,931	4.27%	20,412	4.37%	466,717

==== Counties that flipped from Democratic to Republican ====
- Ingham
- Iosco
- Livingston
- Oscoda

==== Counties that flipped from Republican to Democratic ====
- Otsego
- Roscommon
- Schoolcraft

== District results ==
The remaining 12 electors were chosen by congressional district. Michigan gained one seat in the United States House of Representatives as a result of the 1890 United States census and the state legislature redistricted prior to the 1892 elections. Each of the state's 12 congressional districts voted for a single presidential elector. Harrison won 8 of the 12 congressional districts. As with the at large districts, a full slate of alternate electors were also on the ballot.

=== Summary ===
District	Benjamin Harrison Republican		Grover Cleveland Democratic		John Bidwell Prohibition		James B. Weaver Populist		Margin		Total votes cast
District	#	%	#	%	#	%	#	%	#	%	Total votes cast
1st district	18,332	47.06%	19,990	51.32%	340	0.87%	291	0.75%	-1,658	-4.26%	38,953
2nd district	20,947	44.71%	22,427	47.87%	2,401	5.13%	1,072	2.29%	-1,480	-3.16%	46,847
3rd district	21,233	49.97%	15,756	37.08%	2,562	6.03%	2,938	6.91%	5,477	12.89%	42,489
4th district	21,402	49.19%	20,084	46.16%	2,024	4.65%	0	0.00%	1,318	3.03%	43,510
5th district	20,187	47.72%	18,173	42.96%	1,967	4.65%	1,980	4.68%	2,014	4.76%	42,307
6th district	21,324	47.10%	19,590	43.27%	2,286	5.05%	2,070	4.57%	1,734	3.83%	45,270
7th district	15,723	45.05%	15,984	45.80%	1,283	3.68%	1,842	5.28%	-261	-0.75%	34,902 (Note: Includes 70 Blank votes.)
8th district	16,672	47.27%	15,298	43.37%	1,218	3.45%	1,149	3.26%	1,374	3.90%	35,271 (Note: Includes 934 Scattering votes.)
9th district	14,036	47.25%	12,853	43.27%	1,754	5.90%	1,062	3.58%	1,183	3.98%	29,705
10th district	14,370	45.89%	14,972	47.82%	741	2.37%	1,167	3.73%	-602	-1.92%	31,311
11th district	18,379	50.75%	12,734	35.16%	1,961	5.41%	3,143	8.68%	5,645	15.59%	36,217
12th district	19,811	50.06%	16,888	42.68%	1,851	4.68%	1,023	2.59%	2,923	7.39%	39,573
Totals	222,416	47.69%	204,749	43.90%	20,388	4.37%	17,737	3.80%	17,667	3.79%	466,355

=== District 1 ===
The 1st district was located entirely in Wayne County, covering the 1st through 11th and 13th and 15th wards of the city of Detroit. This was Cleveland's strongest district.

1892 United States presidential election in Michigan - 1st district
Party	Candidate	Votes	%
Democratic	Rufus W. Gillett	19,990	51.32%
Republican	J. Henry Carstens	18,332	47.06%
Prohibition	Leicester B. Dodge	340	0.87%
Populist	Arthur B. Hartford	291	0.75%
Total votes		38,953	100.00%
Majority		1,658	4.26%

=== District 2 ===
The 2nd district consisted of Jackson County, Lenawee County, Monroe County, Washtenaw County, and part of Wayne County. (Note: Specifically, the townships of Brownstown, Canton, Ecorse, Huron, Monguagon, Plymouth, Romulus, Sumpter, Taylor, and Van Buren, and the city of Wyandotte.)

1892 United States presidential election in Michigan - 2nd district
Party	Candidate	Votes	%
Democratic	Edwin R. Smith	22,427	47.87%
Republican	Charles E. Hiscock	20,947	44.71%
Prohibition	Joseph B. Steere	2,401	5.13%
Populist	Martin G. Loenneker	1,072	2.29%
Total votes		46,847	100.00%
Plurality		1,480	3.16%

=== District 3 ===
The 3rd district consisted of Branch County, Calhoun County, Eaton County, Hillsdale County, and Kalamazoo County. This was Bidwell's strongest district.

1892 United States presidential election in Michigan - 3rd district
Party	Candidate	Votes	%
Republican	Otto Ihling	21,233	49.97%
Democratic	James S. Upton	15,756	37.08%
Populist	Henry I. Allen	2,938	6.91%
Prohibition	John H. Ferguson	2,562	6.03%
Total votes		42,489	100.00%
Plurality		5,477	12.89%

=== District 4 ===
The 4th district consisted of Allegan County, Barry County, Berrien County, Cass County, St. Joseph County, and Van Buren County. The Populists nominated the Democratic district elector for their ticket; thus there no votes for Weaver in this district.

1892 United States presidential election in Michigan - 4th district
Party	Candidate	Votes	%
Republican	Philip T. Colgrove	21,402	49.19%
Democratic	Edward Hutchins	20,084	46.16%
Prohibition	Hamilton S. McMaster	2,024	4.65%
Total votes		43,510	100.00%
Plurality		1,318	3.03%

=== District 5 ===
The 5th district consisted of Ionia County, Kent County, and Ottawa County.

1892 United States presidential election in Michigan - 5th district
Party	Candidate	Votes	%
Republican	Conrad G. Swenberg	20,187	47.72%
Democratic	Thomas Hefferan	18,173	42.96%
Populist	Nathan B. Hayes	1,980	4.68%
Prohibition	William Frye	1,967	4.65%
Total votes		42,307	100.00%
Plurality		2,014	4.76%

=== District 6 ===
The 6th district consisted of Genesee County, Ingham County, Livingston County, Oakland County, and part of Wayne County. (Note: Specifically, the townships of Dearborn, Greenfield, Livonia, Nankin, Redford, and Springwells, and the 12th, 14th, and 16th wards of the city of Detroit.)

1892 United States presidential election in Michigan - 6th district
Party	Candidate	Votes	%
Republican	Henry A. Haigh	21,324	47.10%
Democratic	Orlando F. Barnes	19,590	43.27%
Prohibition	Lucius H. Ives	2,286	5.05%
Populist	George Northrop	2,070	4.57%
Total votes		45,270	100.00%
Plurality		1,734	3.83%

=== District 7 ===
The 7th district consisted of Huron County, Lapeer County, Macomb County, Sanilac County, St. Clair County, and part of Wayne County. (Note: Specifically, the townships of Grosse Pointe and Hamtramck.) This was the closest of the district races, with Cleveland's elector winning by only 261 votes.

1892 United States presidential election in Michigan - 7th district
Party	Candidate	Votes	%
Democratic	Frank W. Hubbard	15,984	45.80%
Republican	James H. White	15,723	45.05%
Populist	Jedediah Spalding	1,842	5.28%
Prohibition	George W. Smith	1,283 (Note: Includes 506 votes for "George Washington Smith" that were counted separately.)	3.68%
Independent	Blank	70	0.20%
Total votes		34,902	100.00%
Plurality		261	0.75%

=== District 8 ===
The 8th district consisted of Clinton County, Saginaw County, Shiawassee County, and Tuscola County.

1892 United States presidential election in Michigan - 8th district
Party	Candidate	Votes	%
Republican	Frank Slocum	16,672	47.27%
Democratic	William A. Woodard	15,298	43.37%
Prohibition	William A. Heartt	1,218	3.45%
Populist	Philo P. Miner	1,149	3.26%
Independent	James M. Goodell	934	2.65%
Total votes		35,271	100.00%
Plurality		1,374	3.90%

=== District 9 ===
The 9th district consisted of Benzie County, Lake County, Leelanau County, Manistee County, Manitou County, Mason County, Muskegon County, Newaygo County, Oceana County, and Wexford County.

1892 United States presidential election in Michigan - 9th district
Party	Candidate	Votes	%
Republican	James S. Stearns	14,036	47.25%
Democratic	Martin Waalkes	12,853	43.27%
Prohibition	Oscar A. Rowland	1,754 (Note: Includes 61 votes in Oceana County for "Oscar Rowland" that were listed separately.)	5.90%
Populist	George R. Kinsman	1,062	3.58%
Total votes		29,705	100.00%
Plurality		1,183	3.98%

=== District 10 ===
The 10th district consisted of Alcona County, Alpena County, Arenac County, Bay County, Cheboygan County, Crawford County, Emmet County, Gladwin County, Iosco County, Midland County, Montmorency County, Ogemaw County, Oscoda County, Otsego County, and Presque Isle County. Cleveland and Harrison tied in Alpena County (Cleveland won Alpena County by 10 votes in the Eastern district) and Weaver won Arenac County (which he also did in the Eastern district).

1892 United States presidential election in Michigan - 10th district
Party	Candidate	Votes	%
Democratic	Worthy L. Churchill	14,972	47.82%
Republican	John Millen	14,370	45.89%
Populist	Mendel J. Bailey	1,167	3.73%
Prohibition	Clarence M. Church	741	2.37%
Independent	Scattering	61 (Note: 54 for Milo Eastman and 7 for Rasmus Hanson, who were the Democratic and Republican alternate elector candidates, respectively.)	0.19%
Total votes		31,311	100.00%
Plurality		602	1.92%

=== District 11 ===
The 11th district consisted of Antrim County, Charlevoix County, Clare County, Grand Traverse County, Gratiot County, Isabella County, Kalkaska County, Mecosta County, Missaukee County, Montcalm County, Osceola County, and Roscommon County. This was the strongest district for both Harrison and Weaver.

1892 United States presidential election in Michigan - 11th district
Party	Candidate	Votes	%
Republican	Julius T. Hannah	18,379	50.75%
Democratic	Lyman H. Pratt	12,734	35.16%
Populist	Dewitt Vought	3,143	8.68%
Prohibition	George W. Hall	1,961	5.41%
Total votes		36,217	100.00%
Majority		5,645	15.59%

=== District 12 ===
The 12th district consisted of Alger County, Baraga County, Chippewa County, Delta County, Dickinson County, Gogebic County, Houghton County, Iron County, Keweenaw County, Luce County, Mackinac County, Marquette County, Menominee County, Ontonagon County, and Schoolcraft County.

1892 United States presidential election in Michigan - 12th district
Party	Candidate	Votes	%
Republican	John H. Comstock	19,811	50.06%
Democratic	Frederick Braastad	16,888	42.68%
Prohibition	Trowbridge Johns	1,851	4.68%
Populist	Oscar M. Drake	1,023	2.59%
Total votes		39,573	100.00%
Majority		2,923	7.39%

== See also ==
- United States presidential elections in Michigan
