= Zephaniah W. Bunce =

American politician (1787–1889)

Zephaniah Webster Bunce (November 14, 1787 – October 8, 1889) was an early Anglo-American settler in St. Clair County, Michigan and a member of the Michigan Territorial Council.

Born in Hartford, Connecticut, Bunce first came to St. Clair, County, Michigan Territory in 1817. He settled near a mill operated by Duperon Baby at a place that would eventually become Bunceville, Michigan. This is the present-day site of the Marysville Power Plant. The Ojibwe were still in the area and early on Bunce was involved with trading with them. He was later involved in the lumber industry and served as a probate judge. He was elected to the First Michigan Territorial Council in 1824. Bunce served as a colonel in the Third Michigan Militia. Bunce died in St. Clair County, Michigan.
