= Hubert Lacroix (American politician) =

American soldier and politician

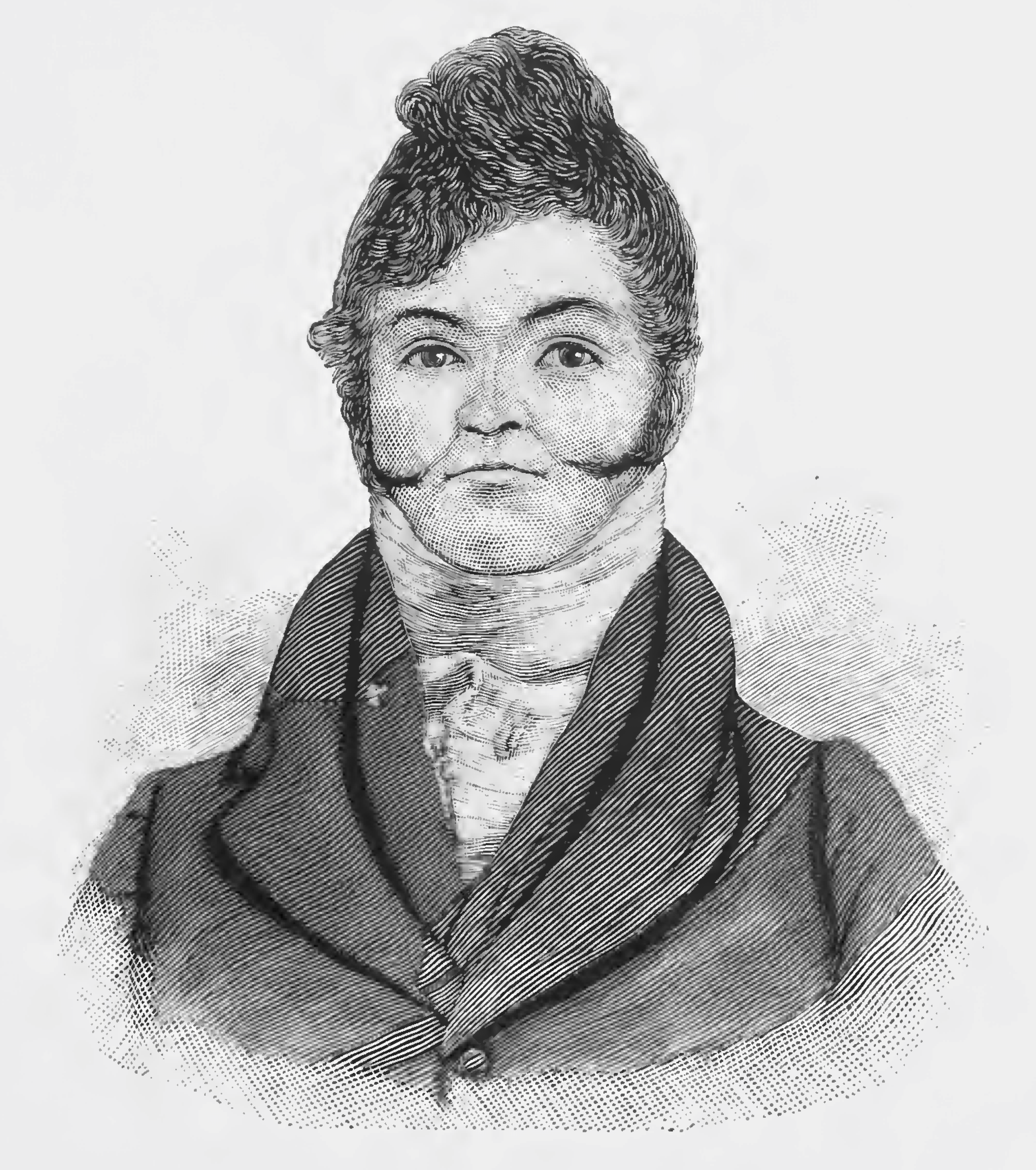

Personal details
- Born: 1778 or 1779 Montreal, Quebec, Canada
- Died: September 14, 1827 (aged 48) Monroe, Michigan, U.S.

Hubert Lacroix or Le Croix (1778 or 1779 — September 14, 1827) was an American soldier, trader, and politician who fought in the War of 1812. He was captured by the British following the surrender of Detroit and saved from charges of treason by his friend, the Shawnee chief Tecumseh. Lacroix later served two terms as a member of the Michigan Territorial Council.

== Biography ==
Hubert Lacroix was a native of Montreal, born in either 1778 or 1779. He settled along the River Raisin in Michigan Territory in 1800, became an American citizen, and engaged in trade as an employee of the North West Fur Company.

When Colonel John Anderson organized a local militia, Lacroix was the first man to enlist. He was unanimously chosen as captain of his company in April 1812, just prior to the outbreak of the War of 1812, and since he lived quite a ways upriver, Territorial Governor William Hull asked him to move closer to the mouth of the river. While his company built Hull's Trace to Fort Detroit he began construction of a new house along the river within the boundaries of present-day Monroe, Michigan that spring. The house, still under construction, was burned on January 23, 1813, the final day of the Battle of the River Raisin.

Following Hull's surrender of Detroit in August 1812, Lacroix was taken prisoner by the British. Though his fellow militiamen had been paroled, since Lacroix had been born in Montreal, he was to face charges of treason there. Lacroix had earlier established a friendship with the Shawnee chief Tecumseh, who was allied with the British. To avoid upsetting their ally, the British took Lacroix out of Detroit secretly by boat and held him on a prison ship near Fort Malden, Ontario, to await transport back to Quebec. Lacroix's daughter informed Tecumseh of her father's arrest, and Tecumseh went to ask British General Henry Procter about it. Though Procter was inclined to deny it, Tecumseh ordered him to tell the truth, saying, "If I ever detect you in a falsehood, I, along with my Indians, will immediately abandon you". Procter admitted to holding Lacroix prisoner and when Tecumseh demanded he be released, Procter complied.

When Monroe County was organized in 1817, Lacroix was named a colonel in the militia as well as the county sheriff. He built a new brick house on his destroyed property between 1817 and 1818, which may have been the first brick structure in the county; the house, near the site of the modern River Raisin National Battlefield Park, was destroyed in 1912.

When the government of the Territory of Michigan was restructured to include a new legislative council, Lacroix was one of the top 18 vote-earners in a general election. Those names were sent to President James Monroe, who selected nine, including Lacroix, to form the First Michigan Territorial Council. Lacroix also served on the second council.

Following the end of the second council's session in April 1827, Lacroix walked home from Detroit to Monroe, and became ill due to exposure. After several months of illness, he died in Monroe on September 14, 1827.
