= Wolcott Lawrence =

American lawyer and politician

Personal details
- Born: November 1, 1786 near Pittsfield, Massachusetts, U.S.
- Died: April 29, 1843 (aged 56); Monroe, Michigan, U.S.

Wolcott Lawrence (November 1, 1786 — April 29, 1843) was an American jurist, businessman, and politician who served multiple terms on the Michigan Territorial Council.

== Biography ==
Wolcott Lawrence was born November 1, 1786, in a town near Pittsfield, Massachusetts. He received a rural education and did not attend college, but studied law in the office of a prominent Pittsfield lawyer and eventually practiced law himself. In 1817, shortly after their wedding, Lawrence and his wife moved to Monroe, Michigan, and established a home on the River Raisin. His law practice was slow at first due to the sparse population of the area, but grew as the population grew. He gradually shifted his attention away from law towards the lumber and mercantile businesses as well as management of his real estate investments.

When the government of the Territory of Michigan was restructured to include a new legislative council, Lawrence was one of the top 18 vote-earners in a general election. Those names were sent to President James Monroe, who selected nine, including Lawrence, to form the First Michigan Territorial Council in 1824. He continued to serve on the council until 1831, and was chairman of the judiciary committee for the entire time. Following Michigan's statehood, in 1836 he was appointed an associate justice of the Monroe County circuit court, and served until 1839. Lawrence died in Monroe on April 29, 1843.

=== Family ===
Lawrence married Caroline Stebbins, of Springfield, Massachusetts, on November 28, 1816. Their eldest child, Lucretia Williams, was born in Monroe in December 1817, and was the first child born to American parents in the otherwise largely French community. Lucretia later married Alpheus Felch, a future governor of Michigan and United States senator.
