= Abraham Edwards (Michigan politician) =

American physician and politician

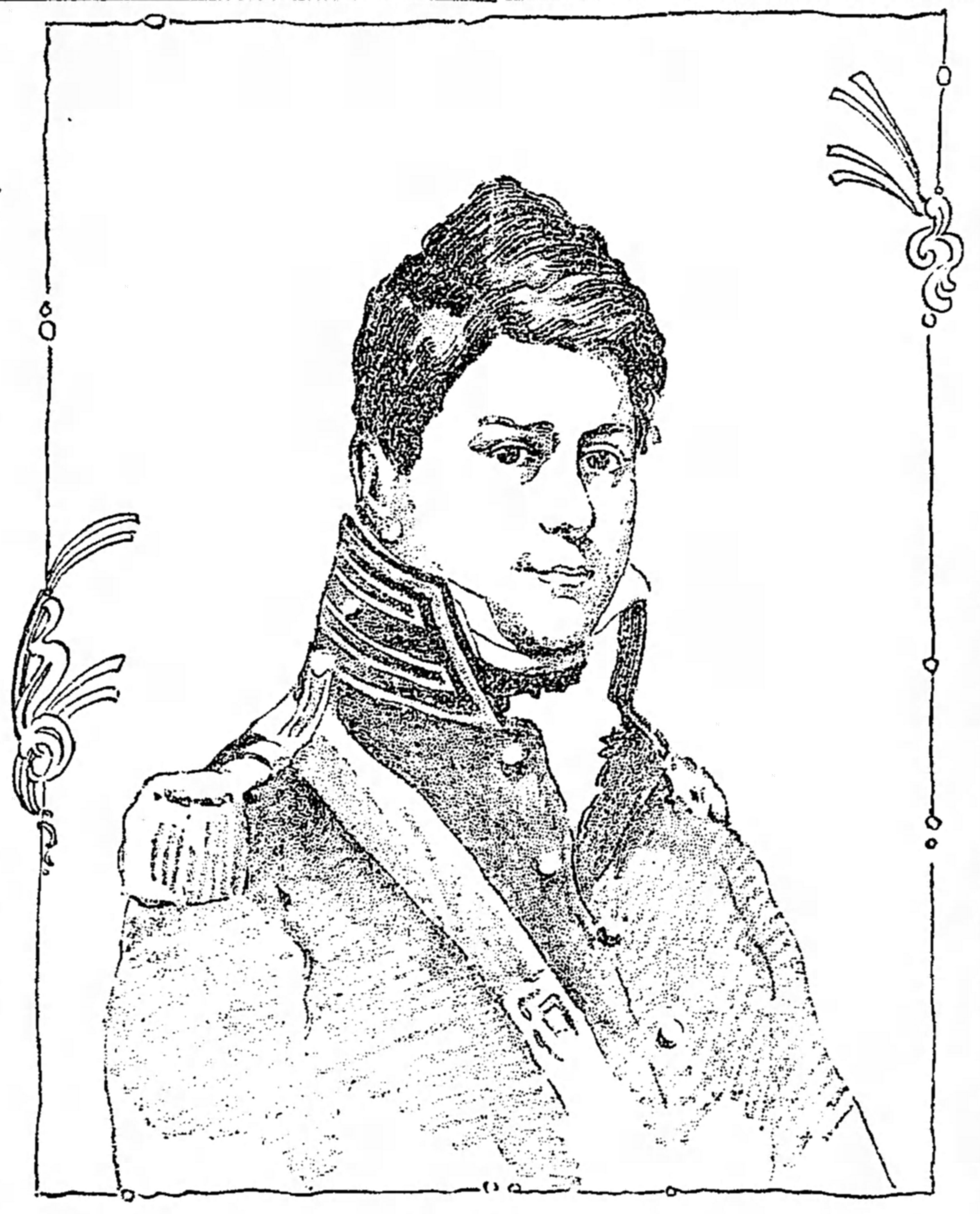

Personal details
- Born: November 17, 1781 Springfield, New Jersey, U.S.
- Died: October 22, 1860 (aged 78) Kalamazoo, Michigan, U.S.
- Party: Democratic

Abraham Edwards (November 17, 1781 – October 22, 1860) was an American medical doctor and politician in the U.S. state of Michigan. He served in the U.S. Army during the War of 1812 and was president of the Michigan Territorial Council for a majority of its existence.

== Biography ==
Abraham Edwards was born in Springfield, New Jersey, on November 17, 1781. He was the eldest son of Captain Aaron Edwards. He studied medicine and became a medical doctor in 1803.

He was appointed a surgeon in the U.S. Army in 1804 and was stationed in Fort Wayne, where he met his wife. When she became ill in 1810, he resigned his commission and moved to Dayton, Ohio, to practice medicine. He was elected to the Ohio General Assembly in 1811, representing Montgomery County in the Ohio House of Representatives.

=== Service during the War of 1812 ===
In the prelude to the War of 1812, Edwards was appointed captain in the 19th Infantry Regiment, and his unit joined with General William Hull's army marching toward Detroit to defend it from the British. He was selected to fill a vacancy as the surgeon for the 4th Infantry Regiment and remained in that post until Hull's surrender of Detroit to Isaac Brock on August 16, 1812. He was taken prisoner but was paroled and allowed to return home to Dayton. After being exchanged for a British officer, he resumed service as a captain in charge of recruiting at Chillicothe, Ohio, until November 1813. He took 200 men of the 19th Regiment to Detroit in December 1813 at the order of General Lewis Cass, then accompanied Cass to Albany, New York, to attend Hull's court-martial. Edwards then traveled to Washington, D.C., where he was promoted to the rank of major and placed in charge of the quartermaster's stores in Pittsburgh, where he served for the rest of the war.

Following the resumption of peace, Edwards was given the opportunity to remain in the army as a captain, but he chose to return to private practice and moved his family to Detroit in October 1815.

=== Political career ===
In Detroit, Edwards resumed his interest in politics and was elected president of the city's board of trustees in 1816 and 1817. This gave him the opportunity to meet and host President James Monroe on his visit to Detroit in 1818. Edwards served as treasurer of the University of Michigan in 1821 and then on its Board of Trustees from 1822 to 1837.

The Territory of Michigan held an election in 1823 that chose 18 people—including Edwards—from whom President Monroe was to select nine to form the First Michigan Territorial Council, a new legislative body to replace the governor and judges that had previously governed the territory. Edwards was one of the nine Monroe appointed, and was elected president of the council at its first session, a position which he held for the next eight years.

Edwards left Detroit in 1828, along with his wife and ten children, and started west with three covered wagons. They traveled for 18 days before stopping in the settlement of Beardsley's Prairie in Cass County, Michigan, where they built a new home. The village was later renamed Edwardsburg after him. He was appointed register in the land office established in White Pigeon in 1831, and the family moved there. The land office moved again in May 1834, to Kalamazoo, and the Edwards family again moved with it.

He stayed in his position at the land office until 1849, when he was removed by President Zachary Taylor because he was a Democrat. In 1852, Edwards served as an elector for Michigan, casting his vote for the Democratic nominees, Franklin Pierce and William R. King.

Edwards died in Kalamazoo on October 22, 1860.

=== Family ===
Edwards married Ruth Fessenden Hunt in Fort Wayne in June 1805. She was the daughter of the fort's commandant, Colonel Thomas Hunt. Among their ten children were Thomas, Alexander, Henry, Alice, and Julia.

== Notes ==
Political offices
New creation	Member (at large) of Michigan Territorial Council; June 7, 1824 — November 2, 1826	Members chosen by district
Members served at-large	Member from 1st District of Michigan Territorial Council; November 2, 1826 — May 5, 1828; With: Henry Connor; Robert A. Forsyth; John McDonell	Un-numbered districts
Numbered districts	Member from Wayne County District of Michigan Territorial Council; May 5, 1828 — May 11, 1830; With: William Brown; Henry Connor; John McDonell	Numbered districts
Un-numbered districts	Member from 2nd District of Michigan Territorial Council; May 11, 1830 — May 1, 1832; With: Laurent Durocher	Succeeded by Alfred Ashley
New creation	President of Michigan Territorial Council; June 7, 1824 — May 1, 1832	Succeeded by John McDonell
