= John Stockton (Michigan soldier) =

American politician

John Stockton (December 24, 1798 – November 21, 1878) was an American soldier, pioneer, and territorial legislator.

== Early life ==
Born in Lancaster, Pennsylvania, he moved with his family to a farm in Chillicothe, Ohio.

== Professional career ==
During the War of 1812, Stockton served in the United States Army. In 1815, Stockton served as private secretary to Lewis Cass, Governor of Michigan Territory. In 1817, Stockton settled in Mount Clemens, Michigan. Stockton served as clerk, register, and justice of the peace of Macomb County, Michigan. Stockton served in the Michigan Territorial Council from 1824 to 1831 and then 1834 to 1835. He was a Democrat. Stockton also served as postmaster of Mount Clemens, Michigan. Stockton served as an officer of the 8th Michigan Volunteer Cavalry Regiment during the American Civil War. Stockton died in Mount Clemens, Michigan.
