= Laurent Durocher =

American judge and politician

Member of the Michigan Senate from the 2nd district
- In office November 2, 1835 – July 9, 1836

Member of the Michigan House of Representatives from the Monroe County district
- In office January 7, 1839 – January 5, 1840

Personal details
- Born: October 21, 1788 Ste. Genevieve, New Spain
- Died: September 21, 1861 (aged 72) Monroe, Michigan
- Party: Democratic

Laurent Durocher (October 21, 1788 – September 21, 1861) was an American judge and politician in the U.S. state of Michigan. He was involved in the formation of Monroe County, Michigan, and held numerous official posts during the first decades of its existence, and was also a member of both the Michigan House of Representatives and Michigan Senate.

== Biography ==
Laurent Durocher was born in Ste. Genevieve, Spanish Louisiana, New Spain on October 21, 1788, the son of Laurent Durocher and Marie Janis. He attended the Collège de Montréal. Durocher first came to the Michigan Territory in 1803 before settling at Frenchtown, Michigan in 1805.

He volunteered to fight in the American army under General William Hull prior to the outbreak of the War of 1812. Following Hull's surrender of Detroit on August 16, 1812, Durocher and the other defenders of Frenchtown held out for two more days before surrendering their arms. Left free, but unarmed, they were unable to stop the Native Americans who began to pillage the town. Durocher remained there as a paroled prisoner of war until the town was recaptured by General James Winchester in the First Battle of Frenchtown. Durocher was one of several people who went to the Navarre House early the morning of August 22, 1813, to warn Winchester of reports that the British were reporting a surprise attack. The attack succeeded, Winchester was taken prisoner, and Durocher was a witness to the Raisin River Massacre that followed. He later wrote a defense of the prisoners of war of French descent, saying that, contrary to speculation, they remained ready to take up arms against the British even as prisoners of war.

He served as the clerk of Monroe County, Michigan, for several years following its organization in 1818, as the county tax collector in 1824, and the supervisor of Frenchtown Township in 1834 and again from 1842 to 1848.

Durocher was a member of all but the first of the territorial councils of Michigan Territory, as well as a delegate to the convention that drafted the first state constitution in 1835. Following adoption of the constitution, he was elected as a Democrat to the Michigan Senate and served during its first session in 1835 and 1836; he resigned before the end of the session, on July 9, 1836, citing a sickness in his family. He was later elected to the Michigan House of Representatives and served one term in 1839. He was a county probate judge in 1844, 1850, and 1852, and served as justice of the peace in the city of Monroe, in 1850 and 1853.

He was serving as city clerk of Monroe when he died on September 21, 1861. He is buried at the Old Burial Ground in Monroe.

=== Family ===
Durocher married Monique Cosme, of Detroit, in Monroe on April 22, 1811. They had ten children: Laurent, Emélie, Euphrosine, Cosme, Luc, Cléophase, Marie, Dorothée Monique, Elizabeth, and Caroline.
