= Amir Makled =

American attorney and politician

Member-elect of the University of Michigan Board of Regents
- Assuming office January 1, 2027
- Governor: Jocelyn Benson (elect)
- Succeeding: Jordan Acker

Personal details
- Born: January 1987 (age 39) Detroit, Michigan, U.S.
- Party: Democratic
- Education: University of Michigan, Dearborn (BA); Wayne State University (JD)

Amir Makled (born January 1987) is an American attorney and politician who is a regent-elect of the University of Michigan. A member of the Democratic Party, he also represented students who participated in Gaza war protests at the University of Michigan.

== Career ==
In April 2025, Makled was detained by federal immigration agents while returning from a family vacation. He believed the arrest was in connection with the student he was representing at the time, as he was never given a reason for the arrest.

On April 19, 2026, Makled defeated Jordan Acker in his attempt at re-election to the University of Michigan Board of Regents at the Democratic state convention. In the 2026 University of Michigan Board of Regents election, Makled was elected as part of a blue wave in Michigan.
