= 2026 University of Michigan Board of Regents election =

- November 3, 2026

2 of 8 seats on the University of Michigan Board of Regents 5 seats needed for a majority
	First party	Second party
Party	Democratic	Republican
Seats before	6	2
Seats after	6	2
Seat change	Steady	Steady

The 2026 University of Michigan Board of Regents election was held on November 3, 2026, to elect two of eight regents of the University of Michigan. Parties nominated candidates through conventions instead of in primary elections. Candidates were elected using plurality block voting.

== Democratic convention ==
=== Candidates ===
==== Nominees ====
- Paul Brown, incumbent regent (2019–present)
- Amir Makled, civil rights attorney

==== Eliminated at convention ====
- Jordan Acker, incumbent regent (2019–present)

=== Endorsements ===
Jordan Acker

Statewide officials

- Gretchen Whitmer, governor of Michigan (2019–present)

State legislators

- Mallory McMorrow, SD-8 (2019–present)

Organizations

- Michigan Association for Justice
Paul Brown

Statewide officials

- Gretchen Whitmer, governor of Michigan (2019–present)

Political parties

- Michigan Democratic Party
Amir Makled

Labor unions

- Graduate Employees' Organization 3550
- ~~Service Employees International Union Michigan~~ (endorsement rescinded)
- United Auto Workers

Political parties

- Michigan Democratic Party

== Republican convention ==
=== Candidates ===
==== Nominees ====
- Lena Epstein, oil executive, nominee for regent in 2022, and nominee for Michigan's 11th congressional district in 2018
- Michael Schostak, Bloomfield Township treasurer

=== Endorsements ===
Lena Epstein

Political parties

- Michigan Republican Party
Michael Schostak

Political parties

- Michigan Republican Party

== Third-party candidates ==
=== Libertarian Party ===
==== Nominee ====
- Andrew Chadderdon, 2024 nominee for regent

=== U.S. Taxpayers Party ===
==== Nominee ====
- Kyle Maas

== General election ==
=== Results ===
2026 University of Michigan Board of Regents election results (vote for not more than 2)
Party	Candidate	Votes	%
Democratic	Paul Brown (incumbent)	2,386,376	27.19
Democratic	Amir Makled	2,245,480	25.58
Republican	Michael Schostak	1,980,055	22.56
Republican	Lena Epstein	1,948,606	22.20
Libertarian	Andrew Chadderdon	111,462	1.27
U.S. Taxpayers	Kyle Maas	104,873	1.20
Total votes		8,776,852	100.0
Democratic hold			
Democratic hold			
