= Thomas Weir (American soldier) =

United States Army officer (1838–1876)

Thomas B. Weir
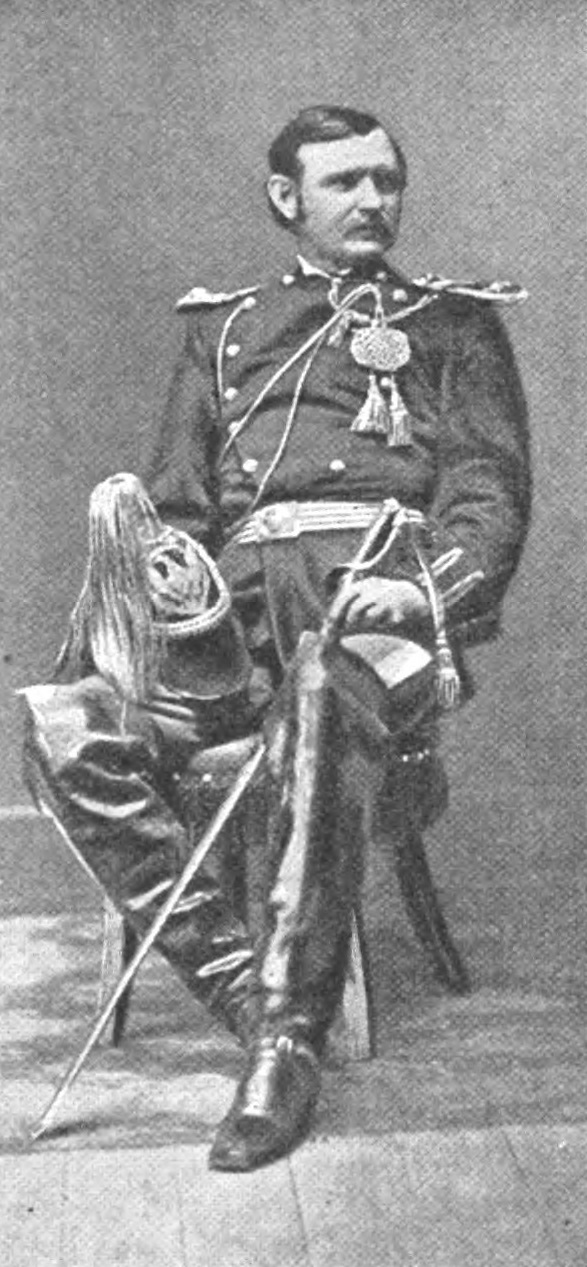
- Born: September 28, 1838; Nashville, Ohio, United States
- Died: December 9, 1876 (aged 38); New York City, New York, United States
- Burial place: Cypress Hills National Cemetery, Brooklyn, New York
- Alma mater: University of Michigan
- Military career
- Allegiance: United States of America; Union
- Branch: United States Army; Union Army
- Service years: 1861–1876
- Rank: Captain (Regular Army); Lieutenant Colonel (U.S. Volunteers); Colonel (Brevet)
- Nickname: Tom
- Commands: Company D, 7th U.S. Cavalry
- Conflicts: American Civil War; American Indian Wars

Thomas Benton Weir (September 28, 1838 – December 9, 1876) was an officer in the 7th Cavalry Regiment (United States), notable for his participation in the Battle of the Little Bighorn, also known as Custer's Last Stand.

Weir first served under General George Armstrong Custer during the American Civil War, and after the war continued serving under Custer's command up to the famous battle in 1876. During the Little Bighorn battle, Weir disobeyed orders to remain in a defensive position at Reno Hill and led a cavalry group that attempted to come to Custer's aid. Weir and the group retreated back to Reno Hill in the face of overwhelming numbers of Native American warriors. A hill on the battlefield, Weir Point, is named in his honor and marks the farthest point of Weir's advance.

Reportedly deeply depressed by his experience in the historic battle, Weir's health declined, and he died only a few months afterwards, aged 38.

== Early life and education ==
Weir was born in Nashville, Ohio. He entered the University of Michigan from Columbus, Ohio in 1856, becoming a member of Beta Theta Pi but not graduating with the Class of 1860. As Thomas Bell Weir, he graduated with a Bachelor of Arts degree in June 1861. Since he was more adept at social activities than academics, university president Henry Philip Tappan once made a pun at his expense:

"Thomas Bell Weir. Thomas Weirs the Bell; may he wear it well."

Among his classmates were Charles Kendall Adams, William Henry Harrison Beadle, Byron M. Cutcheon, Isaac H. Elliott, J. J. Hagerman, Jonas H. McGowan, Edward Searing, Henry Munson Utley and Samuel S. Walker.

== Civil War experience ==
On August 27, 1861, Weir enlisted in Company B of the 3rd Michigan Cavalry and earned quick promotion to first sergeant. By October 1861, he earned promotion to second lieutenant. In June 1862, Weir was promoted to first lieutenant.

Shortly afterwards, he was taken prisoner by the Confederate States Army and was promoted again to captain during the seven months he was held captive. After his release, Weir was assigned as Assistant Inspector General on the staff of Major General George Armstrong Custer. He was promoted to major of Volunteers on January 18, 1865, and lieutenant colonel of Volunteers on November 6, 1865. In army records, his middle name had been changed from Bell to Benton.

In July 1868, Weir received brevet promotions to major, lieutenant colonel, and colonel to recognize his superior performance of duty during the war.

== Battle of the Little Bighorn and Weir Point ==
Released from duty on February 12, 1866, after the war, Weir briefly tried operating a grocery store in Alabama, but only a few months later accepted a commission as a first lieutenant in the regular army on July 28, 1866. Assigned to the 7th Cavalry, he was promoted to captain on July 31, 1867. In 1872, Weir was visited by his University of Michigan classmate Henry M. Utley at Fort Hays, Kansas. Utley found that Weir was well suited to life in the army.

During the Indian Wars on the Great Plains, Weir commanded Company D of the 7th Cavalry under Custer, as part of a two-pronged attack on a large Native American encampment on the Little Bighorn River in Montana on June 25, 1876. Custer had led a detachment north to attack the camp from that direction. Three companies, with Major Marcus Reno in overall command, attacked the south end of the village, but Reno's forces retreated from their initial attack on the south end of the village to a hilltop nearby, now known as Reno Hill, where they were joined by another three companies led by Captain Frederick Benteen, including Weir's Company D, as well as a pack train carrying supplies.

Weir's company, without orders, (and eventually followed by other soldiers including Benteen) moved north from the defensive position on Reno Hill, heading in the direction of the sound of firing from the direction where they believed Custer and his troops were fighting. However, Weir and the would-be relief were forced to retreat back to Reno Hill under fire where they were under further attack until relieved by General Alfred Terry two days later, when the Native American warriors withdrew.

== Weir Point ==
Also known as Weir Ridge, Weir Point is about three miles south from where Custer and the soldiers with him were killed and about one and a half miles north of Reno Hill. Weir Point is the location where Captain Weir and those with him eventually realized after two hours that Custer was beyond their aid, and that hostile warriors were advancing towards the relief force in substantial numbers. From Weir Point the surviving members of the 7th Cavalry withdrew back to the already-established defensive positions on Reno Hill.

In the present era, Weir Point is a modest pull-off on the paved lane that ends at Reno Hill, also known as the Reno-Benteen Battlefield. Weir Point is marked with an illustrated roadside sign naming the hill and showing an artist's rendition of what the artist believed Weir and those with him saw: clouds of dust rising from the bluffs to the north where Custer and his men were wiped out.

== Weir's decline and death ==
Deeply shaken by his experience after the famous battle and showing symptoms of post-traumatic stress, Weir's mental health declined rapidly. Weir wrote letters to Custer's widow, Elizabeth Bacon Custer, hinting at untold matters regarding her husband's death. Formally posted back to New York City on recruiting duty, in the final months of his life he refused to go outside, began to drink heavily and in his last days was said to be extremely nervous, to the point of being unable to swallow.

He died at his home in New York City on December 9, 1876, at age 38, less than six months after Custer's death, reportedly in a state of extreme depression. He was buried at the Fort Columbus post cemetery on Governors Island in New York City on December 14, 1876. In the 1880s, his remains were reinterred at Cypress Hills National Cemetery in Brooklyn, New York.

== Media portrayal ==
Weir was played by Robert Schenkkan in the 1991 television movie Son of the Morning Star. He was portrayed by Roger Clark in the 2007 BBC documentary titled Custer's Last Stand. In the 2021 documentary Custer’s Strategy of Defeat, Weir is played by Jeff Wahl.
