= Elon Farnsworth (Michigan Attorney General) =

American politician (1799–1877)

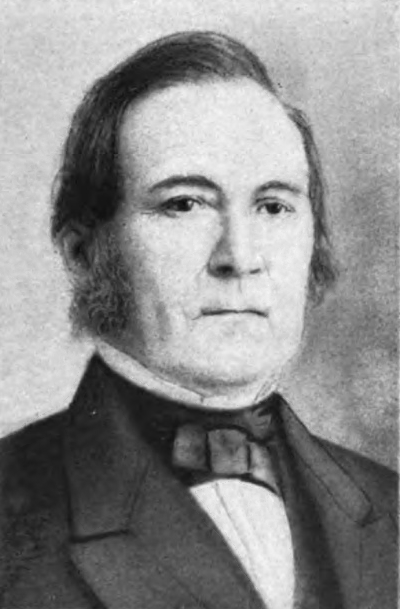

1st and 3rd Chancellor of Michigan
- In office 1846–1847
- Preceded by: Randolph Manning
- Succeeded by: Office abolished
- In office 1836–1842
- Preceded by: Office created
- Succeeded by: Randolph Manning

4th Michigan Attorney General
- In office 1843–1845
- Governor: John S. Barry
- Preceded by: Zephaniah Platt
- Succeeded by: Henry N. Walker

Personal details
- Born: February 2, 1799 Woodstock, Vermont
- Died: March 24, 1877 (aged 78) Detroit, Michigan
- Resting place: Elmwood Cemetery, Detroit

Elon Farnsworth (February 2, 1799 – March 24, 1877) was an American lawyer and politician. He served as both Attorney General and Chancellor of the state of Michigan. He was also the founder of the Detroit Savings Fund Institute, the precursor to Comerica Bank.

== Biography ==
Elon Farnsworth was born February 2, 1799, in Woodstock, Vermont. His father was a farmer and he was educated in the local schools. He moved to Detroit in 1822 and began studying law in the offices of Solomon Sibley, eventually taking over the business after Sibley was elevated to the bench and his other partner died. He later formed his own firm of Farnsworth & Bates with Asher B. Bates.

He was elected to the Legislative Council of Michigan Territory in 1834 and served one term. When the office of Chancellor was created by the new state constitution of 1835, Farnsworth was appointed to it, and served until 1843. He served briefly again between the 1846 resignation of Randolph Manning and the 1847 abolishment of the Court of Chancery.

He ran as the Democratic nominee for Governor of Michigan in 1839, losing to William Woodbridge. After resigning as Chancellor in 1843, Governor John S. Barry appointed Farnsworth as Attorney General, a position which he held for two years.

Farnsworth served several different terms on the Board of Regents of the University of Michigan. As Chancellor of the state, he was an ex officio regent from 1835 to 1843. He was appointed to the board by the Governor in 1846 and served in that capacity until 1852 (while simultaneously being an ex officio member as Chancellor from 1846 to 1847). When the Board of Regents became an elected body in 1852, he was elected to the board and served again until 1858. He was influential in the board's selection of Henry Philip Tappan as the first President of the University of Michigan.

He was a Director of the Michigan Central Railroad and President of the Detroit Savings Bank from 1849 until shortly before his death.

He died March 24, 1877, of complications from a long-term kidney disease and is buried at Elmwood Cemetery.

Party political offices
| Preceded by Stevens T. Mason | Democratic nominee for Governor of Michigan; 1839 | Succeeded by John S. Barry |
Legal offices
| New title Office created | Chancellor of Michigan; 1836–1843 | Succeeded by Randolph Manning |
| Preceded by Zephaniah Platt | Michigan Attorney General; 1843–1845 | Succeeded by Henry N. Walker |
| Preceded by Randolph Manning | Chancellor of Michigan; 1846–1847 | Office abolished |
