= Ronald Weiser =

American businessman, philanthropist, diplomat, and politician (born 1945)

Ron Weiser
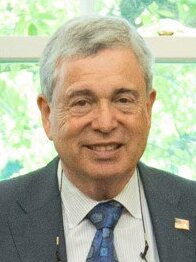

Chair of the Michigan Republican Party
- In office February 6, 2021 – February 18, 2023
- Preceded by: Laura Cox
- Succeeded by: Kristina Karamo
- In office February 11, 2017 – February 23, 2019
- Preceded by: Ronna McDaniel
- Succeeded by: Laura Cox
- In office February 1, 2009 – January 29, 2011
- Preceded by: Saul Anuzis
- Succeeded by: Bobby Schostak

Member of the University of Michigan Board of Regents
- In office January 1, 2017 – January 1, 2025
- Preceded by: Laurence Deitch
- Succeeded by: Carl Meyers

United States Ambassador to Slovakia
- In office December 5, 2001 – December 19, 2004
- President: George W. Bush
- Preceded by: Carl Spielvogel
- Succeeded by: Skip Vallee

Personal details
- Born: July 7, 1945 (age 81) South Bend, Indiana, U.S.
- Party: Republican
- Spouse: Eileen Weiser (m. 1983-2021)
- Children: 3
- Education: University of Michigan (BA)

Ronald N. Weiser (born July 7, 1945) is an American businessman, philanthropist, diplomat, politician, and political fundraiser. He is the founder of McKinley Associates Inc., a real estate investment company. From 2001 to 2004, he served as U.S. Ambassador to Slovakia under the George W. Bush administration. A major donor and financier for the Republican Party, Weiser played key fundraising roles in the presidential campaigns of George W. Bush, John McCain, and Donald Trump. He was elected to the University of Michigan Board of Regents in 2016, serving until 2025, and chaired the Michigan Republican Party during three separate terms (2009–2011, 2017–2019, and 2021–2023).

== Early life, education and real estate career ==
Weiser was born in South Bend, Indiana on July 7, 1945. He graduated in 1966 from the School of Business at University of Michigan.

In 1968, Weiser founded the real estate company McKinley Associates Inc., which is based in Ann Arbor. He was its chairman and chief executive officer until 2001, when he retired from the role upon being confirmed as ambassador to Slovakia. In 2016, McKinley reportedly had $500 million in annual revenue, and had a real estate portfolio valued at $4.6 billion.

== University of Michigan ==
In 2014, Weiser unsuccessfully ran for a seat on the Board of Regents of the University of Michigan. He was elected to the Board of Regents in 2016, defeating incumbent Laurence Deitch. Weiser was, at the time of his election, the only Republican on the board. In 2020, Weiser was the sole regent to vote against a proposal to allow University of Michigan employees to establish recognized bargaining units by card check (i.e., without formal elections); the proposal passed 6–1. His term expired on January 1, 2025.

By June 2020, Weiser and his ex-wife had donated more than $100 million to the University of Michigan. He announced donations of $50 million in 2015, $10 million in 2018, $10 million in February 2020, and $30 million in June 2020. These donations have funded medical centers specializing in breast cancer, prostate cancer, diabetes, food allergies, and pediatric brain tumors, as well as academic centers for real estate, diplomacy, emerging democracies, and Europe and Eurasia.

The relationship between Weiser's ownership of an Ann Arbor real-estate company, and his roles on the Board of Regents and as a major donor, became controversial during arguments over whether to re-open the university during the COVID-19 pandemic.

== Republican Party ==
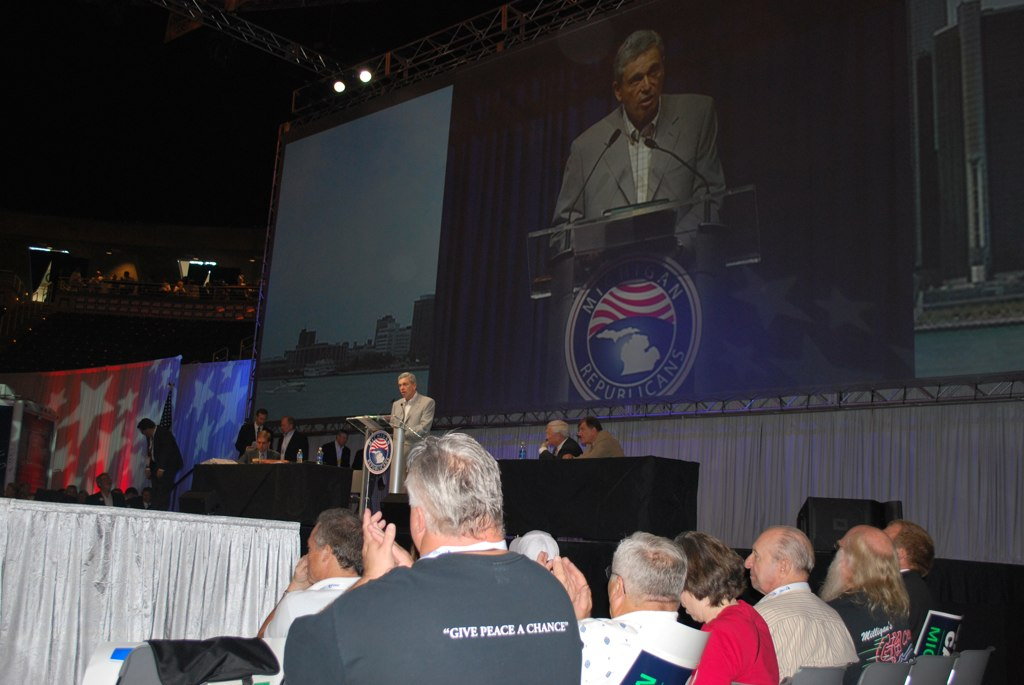
Weiser at the 2010 Michigan Republican State Convention

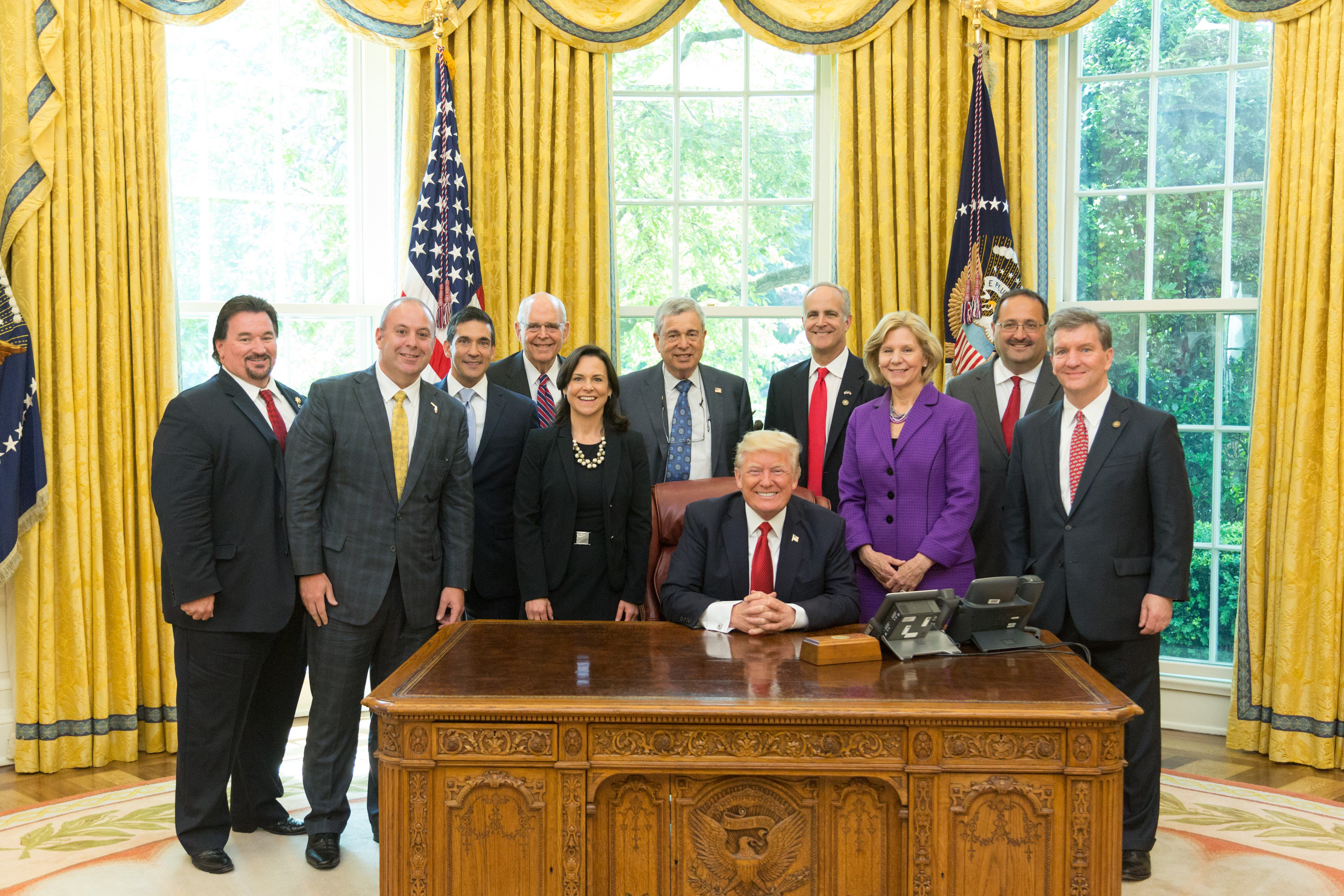
Weiser and other state party chairs meet with President Donald Trump in 2017.

Weiser is a major Republican financier and one of Michigan's biggest political donors. He held fundraising roles for the 2000 presidential campaign of George W. Bush and the 2008 presidential campaign of John McCain. He was Ambassador to Slovakia under President George W. Bush from December 5, 2001 to December 19, 2004.

Weiser was Michigan Republican State Finance Chair from 2005 to 2006. He first became chairman of the Michigan Republican Party in 2009, when he ran unopposed. He held the position from 2009 to 2011, and again from 2017 to 2019. Weiser played a key role in the passage of "right-to-work law" legislation enacted by the Michigan Legislature. In a 2019 editorial, the Detroit News credited Weiser as the architect of "a campaign strategy and a fundraising machine that paved the way for a series of Republican victories" in Michigan, allowing the Republicans to hold complete control of the state government for eight years, even though the state usually leans Democratic. In 2021, Weiser defeated the incumbent chair, Laura Cox, amid an acrimonious internal party feud sparked by Cox's allegations that Weiser was involved in two payoff schemes. Weiser denied the allegation made by Cox.

In February 2011, he was appointed as co-chair of the Republican National Committee (RNC)'s National Finance Transition Committee. He was the RNC's National Finance Chair from April 2011 to February 2013.

Weiser was selected in 2016 to lead the RNC's fundraising efforts for Donald Trump. Weiser donated $50,000 to The MRP Legal Expense Trust Fund, which helped to cover vice president Mike Pence's legal bills generated during the Mueller special counsel investigation. Weiser was a Michigan delegate to the 2020 Republican National Convention; the 73-member Michigan delegation voted unanimously for Trump. In the 2020 election cycle, Weiser and his ex-wife gave $1.6 million to Republican causes, including nearly $168,000 to support Republican state House candidates.

In March 2021, Weiser came under criticism after he was filmed in a speech to a Republican club calling three Democratic state officials—Governor Gretchen Whitmer, Attorney General Dana Nessel, and Secretary of State Jocelyn Benson—"witches" who were ready to be "burned at the stake" in the next election. When asked how to get rid of Republican congressmen Fred Upton and Peter Meijer, who were vilified because they voted to impeach Trump, Weiser replied that "other than assassination," the only way to remove them is to vote them out. He elaborated further, emphasizing, “We happen to live in a democracy where officials are elected by the people. The only way you can change the leadership is to get out and vote.”

After the remarks were publicized, causing an uproar, Weiser said, "I apologize to those I offended for the flippant analogy about three women who are elected officials and for the off-hand comments about two other leaders." He claimed that he had never advocated for violence and added, "While I will always fight for the people and policies I believe in, I pledge to be part of a respectful political dialogue going forward."

University of Michigan Board of Regents chair Denise Ilitch introduced a resolution condemning Weiser's statement and called him to resign from the board; the resolution passed 5–0 at the April 2, 2021 meeting, with Weiser and Sarah Hubbard abstaining, and one regent absent. Ilitch added, "It has become clear that serving as chair of a statewide political party is simply not compatible with serving on this board." Weiser, however, refused to resign, saying, "I regret my poorly chosen words that were offhand remarks made at a private Republican Party meeting" but "I will not be cancelled."

In 2021, Weiser was the primary contributor to a petition campaign to impose new voter ID requirements in Michigan. Weiser’s efforts followed the previous year’s controversial presidential election (in which there was no evidence of widespread voter fraud).

== Personal life ==
Weiser married Eileen in 1983, and was divorced in 2021. He currently resides in Petoskey, Michigan. He has three adult children.

Weiser is on the Atlantic Council's Board of Directors.

Weiser is Jewish.

Diplomatic posts
| Preceded by Carl Spielvogel | United States Ambassador to Slovakia; 2001–2004 | Succeeded by Skip Vallee |
Party political offices
| Preceded by Saul Anuzis | Chair of the Michigan Republican Party; 2009–2011 | Succeeded by Bobby Schostak |
| Preceded by Ronna McDaniel | Chair of the Michigan Republican Party; 2017–2019 | Succeeded by Laura Cox |
| Preceded by Laura Cox | Chair of the Michigan Republican Party; 2021–2023 | Succeeded by Kristina Karamo |
