= Samuel Walker =

Samuel Walker may refer to:

== Sportspeople ==
- Samuel Walker (gymnast) (1883–1960), British gymnast and Olympic medalist
- Samuel Walker (volleyball) (born 1995), Australian volleyball player
- Sam Walker (table tennis) (born 1995), British table tennis player
- Sammy Walker (ice hockey) (born 1999), American ice hockey player

== Politicians and military figures ==
- Samuel Walker (Massachusetts politician) (1793–1860), mayor of Roxbury, Massachusetts, 1851–1853
- Samuel Walker (1779–1851), English ironmaster, MP for Aldeburgh 1818–20
- Samuel Hamilton Walker (1817–1847), US Army major in the Mexican–American War and a Texas Rangers captain
- Samuel Walker (soldier) (1822–1893), American politician, and soldier
- Samuel Walker (Florida politician) (1825–1881), member of the Florida Legislature and mayor of Tallahassee
- Sir Samuel Walker, 1st Baronet (1832–1911), Irish politician and lawyer
- Samuel S. Walker (1841–1909), American businessman and politician in Michigan

== Others ==
- Samuel Walker of Truro (1714–1761), English evangelical clergyman
- J. Samuel Walker (born 1946), American historian and author
- Samuel Dutton Walker (1833–1885), English architect
- Samuel Walker (police accountability expert) (born 1942), American police accountability expert

== See also ==
- Sam Walker (disambiguation)
- Sammy Walker (disambiguation)
