= Julia Donovan Darlow =

American lawyer

Member of the Regents of the University of Michigan
- In office 2007–2014
- Preceded by: Dave Brandon
- Succeeded by: Mike Behm

Personal details
- Party: Democratic
- Education: Vassar College (BA); Wayne State University Law School (JD)
- Occupation: Attorney

Julia Donovan Darlow is an American attorney who is a Regent Emerita of the University of Michigan Board of Regents.

== Education ==
Darlow earned her J.D. in 1971 from Wayne State University Law School. She had previously earned an A.B. in history from Vassar College in 1963.

== Career ==
Darlow practiced law with the law firm Dickinson Wright in Detroit from 1971 to 2004, focusing on international and domestic business transactions and corporate governance, and then with Varnum, Riddering, Schmidt & Howlett LLP in Novi, Michigan from 2005 to 2007, focusing on nonprofit law. She taught as adjunct professor at Wayne State University Law School in 1976 and 1996. Darlow’s many achievements have included serving as:

- The first woman president of the State Bar of Michigan, 1986–1987;
- Michigan Chair of the American Bar Foundation Fellows, 1991–1996;
- Chair of the Michigan Supreme Court Task Force on Gender Issues in the Courts, 1987-1989;
- President of the Women Lawyers Association of Michigan, 1977-1978;
- Reporter and principal drafter of the Michigan Nonprofit Corporation Act; and
- Michigan State Officers Compensation Commission, 1994-1996.

Darlow has served on a number of boards of directors and boards of trustees, including the boards of the Detroit Medical Center, Hutzel Hospital, Michigan Opera Theatre, Marygrove College, Michigan Women's Foundation, the University Musical Society, Hella North America, Inc., North American Lighting, Inc., Intermet Corporation and Hueck Foils, Inc.

In 2006 Darlow was one of four candidates who sought one of the two Democratic nominations for the University of Michigan Board of Regents, whose members are elected by Michigan voters to eight-year terms. Also running in that election were incumbent Regent Kathy White; Denise Ilitch, daughter of Little Caesars owner Mike Ilitch; and Democratic activist Casandra Ulbrich. White and Darlow won the Democratic nominations for U-M Regent at the August 2006 Michigan Democratic Party Convention.

Darlow was elected to the University of Michigan Board of Regents in the November 7, 2006, election, finishing in second place with 1,633,250 votes. Darlow was sworn in as a Regent on January 1, 2007. Darlow did not run for reelection in 2014. She was succeeded by Democrat Mike Behm.
