= Regents of the University of Michigan =

Governing body of the University of Michigan

History
- Founded: March 18, 1837; 189 years ago
- Preceded by: Board of Trustees of the University of Michigan

Structure
- Seats: 8 elected, voting; 1 ex officio, non-voting
- Political groups: Democratic (6); Republican (2)
- Length of term: 8 years
- Authority: Article VIII, sec. 5, Constitution of Michigan
- Salary: unpaid

Website
- regents.umich.edu

The regents of the University of Michigan are eight elected constitutional officers of the U.S. state of Michigan who form the governing body (commonly known as the Board of Regents) (Note: As outlined in the Michigan Constitution, the board is legally known as the Regents of the University of Michigan, though it is often referred to as the Board of Regents in media and university publications.) of the University of Michigan, University of Michigan–Dearborn, and University of Michigan–Flint.

The Board of Regents was first created by legislative act in 1837, and the regents as a body corporate have been defined in the Constitution of Michigan since 1850. Two regents are elected in statewide, partisan elections in each even-numbered year, and serve eight-year terms without compensation. The president of the University of Michigan serves ex officio as the ninth member, but does not vote.

The Regents are one of three elected university governing boards defined by the constitution of Michigan; the Michigan State University Board of Trustees and the Wayne State University Board of Governors are also elected in the same manner. Michigan is one of four U.S. states in which public universities' governing boards are directly elected (along with Colorado, Nebraska, and Nevada). The boards of the other ten public universities in Michigan have members appointed by the governor, and those of public universities in the other 46 states are selected in a similar manner, or by state legislatures.

== Current board ==
As of 2026, the Board of Regents consists of six Democrats and two Republicans, besides the university president ex officio.

Members of the University of Michigan Board of Regents
Name	Start	Next Election	Party
Jordan Acker	January 1, 2019	2026 (lost renomination)	Democratic
Michael Behm, vice chair	January 1, 2015	2030	Democratic
Mark Bernstein, chair	January 1, 2013	2028	Democratic
Paul Brown	January 1, 2019	2026	Democratic
Sarah Hubbard	January 1, 2021	2028	Republican
Denise Ilitch	January 1, 2009	2032	Democratic
Carl Meyers	January 1, 2025	2032	Republican
Katherine White	January 1, 1999	2030	Democratic
Domenico Grasso, president (ex officio)	May 8, 2025		

== History ==
The board of regents was created by the Organic Act of March 18, 1837, that established the modern University of Michigan. The terms of the regents and their method of selection have undergone several changes since 1837, but the board has served as a continuous body since then. Although the board of regents was formed as a new legal entity in 1837, the Michigan Supreme Court ruled in 1856 that it was legally continuous with the board of trustees of the University of Michigan that was formed in 1821, and with the Catholepistemiad, or University, of Michigania that was formed in 1817.

In 1817, Michigan Chief Justice Augustus B. Woodward drafted a territorial act establishing a "Catholepistemiad, or University, of Michigania. The territorial act was signed into law August 26, 1817, by Woodward, Judge John Griffin, and acting governor William Woodbridge (in place of Governor Lewis Cass, who was absent on a trip with President James Monroe). In consequence of the foregoing territorial act and the 1856 ruling, the present-day University of Michigan recognizes 1817 as the year of its founding.

=== Controversy over the homeopathic school ===
Prior to 1850, the University of Michigan in its various incarnations was a product of the Michigan Legislature (or its territorial equivalents), and the Board of Regents and its predecessors were subject to oversight and control by the Legislature. The state constitution of 1850 elevated the Board of Regents to the level of a constitutional corporation, making the University of Michigan the first public institution of higher education in the country so organized. The Legislature did not give up its control easily, and the Board of Regents engaged in a number of battles with legislators before the matter was settled, several of them involving the establishment of a school of homeopathy.

In 1851, a group of citizens who supported the homeopathy movement petitioned the Legislature to force the Board of Regents to add professors of homeopathy to the medical school staff. The board took no action, but Zina Pitcher wrote a detailed account of their thinking to leave for their incoming replacements (the first class of elected regents in 1852):

...shall the accumulated results of three thousand years of experience be laid aside, because there has arisen in the world a sect which, by engrafting a medical dogma upon a spurious theology, have built up a system (so-called) and baptized it Homœopathy? Shall the High Priests of this spiritual school be specially commissioned by the Regents of the University of Michigan, to teach the grown up men of this age that the decillionth of a grain of sulphur will, if administered homœopathically, cure seven-tenths of their diseases, whilst in every mouthful of albuminous food they swallow, every hair upon their heads, and every drop of urine distilled from the kidneys, carries into or out of their system as much of that article as would make a body, if incorporated with the required amount of sugar, as large as the planet Saturn?

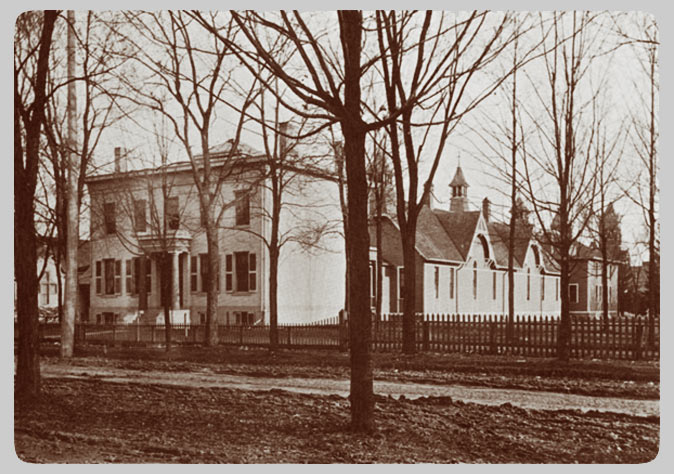
Building housing the Homeopathic Medical College at the center of the Regents' battles with the Legislature

Nothing further happened until 1855, when the Legislature revisited the subject and modified the Organic Act to include the provision that "there shall always be one Professor of Homœopathy in the Department of Medicine." The Board of Regents again took no action to comply. In 1867, the Legislature used the power of the purse and passed a statewide property tax to benefit the university "provided the board of regents would comply with the law of 1855, and appoint at least one professor in the medical department of the university." Although the money was desperately needed, the regents again refused to comply, and two years later the money was released by the Legislature without restriction. By 1871, the expressed public desire for a Homeopathic School led the Board of Regents to consider establishing one at Detroit, separate from the Medical School. In 1875, the school was actually established, but in Ann Arbor, not Detroit.

In 1895, the positions were reversed, and the Legislature tried to force the regents to move the Homeopathic School from Ann Arbor to Detroit. The regents refused, and the Michigan Supreme Court ruled that the state constitution explicitly defined the powers of the Board of Regents independently of the Legislature, while every other corporation the constitution created had its powers specified by the Legislature. Justice Claudius Grant wrote: "No other conclusion was...possible than that the intention was to place the institution in the direct and exclusive control of the people themselves, through a constitutional body elected by them."

This ruling established the precedent that regents are constitutional officers and the Board of Regents is an independent body answerable to the people of the state, not to the Governor or Legislature. The Homeopathic School at the center of the battle was eventually merged into the Medical School in 1922.

=== 2026 commencement address ===
On May 2, 2026, outgoing chair of the faculty senate and professor of history and African studies Derek Peterson delivered an address at the University of Michigan's Spring Commencement ceremony. In his address, he praised "pro-Palestinian student activists who have, over these past two years, opened our hearts to the injustice and inhumanity to Israel’s war in Gaza."

Sarah Hubbard, a Republican and current Michigan Regent, wrote on social media, "While I wasn't there yesterday to see it in person, what I have seen is incredibly troubling and disappointing. It is very difficult to execute meaningful consequences on tenured faculty but as a leader I can help set the tone and expectations for their conduct."

Michael Schostak and Lena Epstein, Republican candidates for the 2026 Michigan Board of Regents election, issued a joint statement condemning Peterson's speech, saying, "commencement ceremonies exist to unite the University community around academic achievement, personal growth, and the promise of what comes next. It should not become a stage for political activism that leaves students feeling excluded or uncomfortable during one of the most important milestones of their lives."

== List of members ==
The name, size, and method of filling the body now known as the Regents of the University Michigan has changed several times in its history.

=== Catholepistemiad, or University, of Michigania (1817–1821) ===
The Catholepistemiad, or University, of Michigania, was established by the Governor and Judges of Michigan Territory in 1817, following a plan devised by Chief Justice Augustus Woodward. The Catholepistemiad was self-governed by the professors (or Didactors) that held its thirteen professorships (didaxiim). In fact, the thirteen didaxiim were divided up between just two men, who thus controlled the entire institution:

- Rev. John Monteith, President (and holder of seven professorships)
- Father Gabriel Richard, vice-president (and holder of six professorships)

=== Board of Trustees of the University of Michigan (1821–1837) ===
In 1821, the Governor and Judges of Michigan Territory renamed the Catholepistemiad to the University of Michigan, and placed control of the university in the hands of a board of trustees consisting of 20 citizens plus the Governor. Their previous positions abolished, Father Richard and Rev. Monteith were both appointed to the board of trustees; Monteith left that summer for a professorship at Hamilton College, while Richard remained on the board until his death in 1832.

As it was common during this era for the Governor to be absent, the various men who served as Acting Governor are included in this list in italics, but no specific dates should be inferred as to when exactly they were Acting Governor. Also, no predecessor/successor relationship among specific Trustees should be inferred from their relative position in the table. Using the terms in office cited in the historical sources, at some points there are up to 22 simultaneous Trustees, even though only 20 were called for.

Year	Governor (ex officio)		Appointed Trustees										
1821	Lewis Cass	William Woodbridge	John Biddle, Nicholas Boilvin, Daniel LeRoy, John Anderson, John R. Williams, Solomon Sibley, John L. Leib, Peter J. Desnoyers, Austin E. Wing, William Woodbridge, William Brown; (all served 1821–1837)	Rev. John Monteith	Henry Jackson Hunt	John Hunt	Charles Larned	Philip Lecuyer	Father Gabriel Richard	Benjamin Stead	Christian Clemens	William H. Puthuff	
1822	Lewis Cass	William Woodbridge	John Biddle, Nicholas Boilvin, Daniel LeRoy, John Anderson, John R. Williams, Solomon Sibley, John L. Leib, Peter J. Desnoyers, Austin E. Wing, William Woodbridge, William Brown; (all served 1821–1837)	Abraham Edwards	Henry Jackson Hunt	John Hunt	Charles Larned	Philip Lecuyer	Father Gabriel Richard	Thomas Rowland		William H. Puthuff	
1823	Lewis Cass	William Woodbridge	John Biddle, Nicholas Boilvin, Daniel LeRoy, John Anderson, John R. Williams, Solomon Sibley, John L. Leib, Peter J. Desnoyers, Austin E. Wing, William Woodbridge, William Brown; (all served 1821–1837)	Abraham Edwards	Henry Jackson Hunt	John Hunt	Charles Larned	Philip Lecuyer	Father Gabriel Richard	Thomas Rowland		William H. Puthuff	
1824	Lewis Cass	William Woodbridge	John Biddle, Nicholas Boilvin, Daniel LeRoy, John Anderson, John R. Williams, Solomon Sibley, John L. Leib, Peter J. Desnoyers, Austin E. Wing, William Woodbridge, William Brown; (all served 1821–1837)	Abraham Edwards	Henry Jackson Hunt	John Hunt	Charles Larned	Philip Lecuyer	Father Gabriel Richard	Thomas Rowland		William H. Puthuff	
1825	Lewis Cass	William Woodbridge	John Biddle, Nicholas Boilvin, Daniel LeRoy, John Anderson, John R. Williams, Solomon Sibley, John L. Leib, Peter J. Desnoyers, Austin E. Wing, William Woodbridge, William Brown; (all served 1821–1837)	Abraham Edwards	Henry Jackson Hunt	John Hunt	Charles Larned	Philip Lecuyer	Father Gabriel Richard	Thomas Rowland			
1826	Lewis Cass	William Woodbridge	John Biddle, Nicholas Boilvin, Daniel LeRoy, John Anderson, John R. Williams, Solomon Sibley, John L. Leib, Peter J. Desnoyers, Austin E. Wing, William Woodbridge, William Brown; (all served 1821–1837)	Abraham Edwards	Henry Jackson Hunt	John Hunt	Charles Larned	Philip Lecuyer	Father Gabriel Richard	Thomas Rowland			
1827	Lewis Cass	William Woodbridge	John Biddle, Nicholas Boilvin, Daniel LeRoy, John Anderson, John R. Williams, Solomon Sibley, John L. Leib, Peter J. Desnoyers, Austin E. Wing, William Woodbridge, William Brown; (all served 1821–1837)	Abraham Edwards		John Hunt	Charles Larned	Philip Lecuyer	Father Gabriel Richard	Thomas Rowland			
1827	Lewis Cass		John Biddle, Nicholas Boilvin, Daniel LeRoy, John Anderson, John R. Williams, Solomon Sibley, John L. Leib, Peter J. Desnoyers, Austin E. Wing, William Woodbridge, William Brown; (all served 1821–1837)	Abraham Edwards	Jonathan Kearsley	Noah M. Wells	Charles Larned	Philip Lecuyer	Father Gabriel Richard	Thomas Rowland	James Kingsley	L. Humphrey	Richard Berry
1828	Lewis Cass		John Biddle, Nicholas Boilvin, Daniel LeRoy, John Anderson, John R. Williams, Solomon Sibley, John L. Leib, Peter J. Desnoyers, Austin E. Wing, William Woodbridge, William Brown; (all served 1821–1837)	Abraham Edwards	Jonathan Kearsley	Noah M. Wells	Charles Larned	Philip Lecuyer	Father Gabriel Richard	Thomas Rowland	James Kingsley	L. Humphrey	Richard Berry
1829	Lewis Cass		John Biddle, Nicholas Boilvin, Daniel LeRoy, John Anderson, John R. Williams, Solomon Sibley, John L. Leib, Peter J. Desnoyers, Austin E. Wing, William Woodbridge, William Brown; (all served 1821–1837)	Abraham Edwards	Jonathan Kearsley	Noah M. Wells	Charles Larned	Philip Lecuyer	Father Gabriel Richard	Thomas Rowland	James Kingsley	L. Humphrey	Richard Berry
1830	Lewis Cass	James Witherell	John Biddle, Nicholas Boilvin, Daniel LeRoy, John Anderson, John R. Williams, Solomon Sibley, John L. Leib, Peter J. Desnoyers, Austin E. Wing, William Woodbridge, William Brown; (all served 1821–1837)	Abraham Edwards	Jonathan Kearsley	Noah M. Wells	Charles Larned	Philip Lecuyer	Father Gabriel Richard	Thomas Rowland	James Kingsley	L. Humphrey	Richard Berry
1830	Lewis Cass	John T. Mason	John Biddle, Nicholas Boilvin, Daniel LeRoy, John Anderson, John R. Williams, Solomon Sibley, John L. Leib, Peter J. Desnoyers, Austin E. Wing, William Woodbridge, William Brown; (all served 1821–1837)	Abraham Edwards	Jonathan Kearsley	Noah M. Wells	Charles Larned	Philip Lecuyer	Father Gabriel Richard	Thomas Rowland	James Kingsley	L. Humphrey	Richard Berry
1831	Lewis Cass	John T. Mason	John Biddle, Nicholas Boilvin, Daniel LeRoy, John Anderson, John R. Williams, Solomon Sibley, John L. Leib, Peter J. Desnoyers, Austin E. Wing, William Woodbridge, William Brown; (all served 1821–1837)	Abraham Edwards	Jonathan Kearsley	Noah M. Wells	Charles Larned	Philip Lecuyer	Father Gabriel Richard	Thomas Rowland	James Kingsley	L. Humphrey	Richard Berry
1831	George B. Porter	Stevens T. Mason	John Biddle, Nicholas Boilvin, Daniel LeRoy, John Anderson, John R. Williams, Solomon Sibley, John L. Leib, Peter J. Desnoyers, Austin E. Wing, William Woodbridge, William Brown; (all served 1821–1837)	Abraham Edwards	Jonathan Kearsley	Noah M. Wells	Charles Larned	Philip Lecuyer	Father Gabriel Richard	Thomas Rowland	James Kingsley	L. Humphrey	Richard Berry
1832	George B. Porter	Stevens T. Mason	John Biddle, Nicholas Boilvin, Daniel LeRoy, John Anderson, John R. Williams, Solomon Sibley, John L. Leib, Peter J. Desnoyers, Austin E. Wing, William Woodbridge, William Brown; (all served 1821–1837)	Abraham Edwards	Jonathan Kearsley	Noah M. Wells	Charles Larned	Philip Lecuyer	Father Gabriel Richard	Thomas Rowland	James Kingsley	L. Humphrey	Richard Berry
1833	George B. Porter	Stevens T. Mason	John Biddle, Nicholas Boilvin, Daniel LeRoy, John Anderson, John R. Williams, Solomon Sibley, John L. Leib, Peter J. Desnoyers, Austin E. Wing, William Woodbridge, William Brown; (all served 1821–1837)	Abraham Edwards	Jonathan Kearsley	Noah M. Wells	Charles Larned	Philip Lecuyer		Thomas Rowland	James Kingsley	L. Humphrey	Richard Berry
1834	Stevens T. Mason		John Biddle, Nicholas Boilvin, Daniel LeRoy, John Anderson, John R. Williams, Solomon Sibley, John L. Leib, Peter J. Desnoyers, Austin E. Wing, William Woodbridge, William Brown; (all served 1821–1837)	Abraham Edwards	Jonathan Kearsley					Thomas Rowland			
1835	Stevens T. Mason	John S. Horner	John Biddle, Nicholas Boilvin, Daniel LeRoy, John Anderson, John R. Williams, Solomon Sibley, John L. Leib, Peter J. Desnoyers, Austin E. Wing, William Woodbridge, William Brown; (all served 1821–1837)	Abraham Edwards	Jonathan Kearsley				John McDonnell	Thomas Rowland			
1836	Stevens T. Mason		John Biddle, Nicholas Boilvin, Daniel LeRoy, John Anderson, John R. Williams, Solomon Sibley, John L. Leib, Peter J. Desnoyers, Austin E. Wing, William Woodbridge, William Brown; (all served 1821–1837)	Abraham Edwards	Jonathan Kearsley				John McDonnell	Thomas Rowland			
1837	Stevens T. Mason		John Biddle, Nicholas Boilvin, Daniel LeRoy, John Anderson, John R. Williams, Solomon Sibley, John L. Leib, Peter J. Desnoyers, Austin E. Wing, William Woodbridge, William Brown; (all served 1821–1837)	Abraham Edwards	Jonathan Kearsley	Ross Wilkins	John Norvell		John McDonnell	Thomas Rowland			

Source: (Shaw 1942)

=== Appointed Regents of the University of Michigan (1837–1852) ===
The Organic Act of March 18, 1837, created the modern board of regents. In its original form, it consisted of 12 members appointed by the Governor with the consent of the Senate, along with the Governor himself, the Lieutenant Governor, the Justices of the Michigan Supreme Court, and the Chancellor of the state. The act also created the office of chancellor of the university, who was to be appointed by the Regents and serve as ex officio President of the board. In fact, however, the Regents never appointed a chancellor, instead leaving administrative duties up to a rotating roster of professors, and the Governor chaired the board himself.

Although the name of the institution they governed was the same, the Board of Regents was a distinct legal entity from the board of trustees. The Board of Trustees transferred all of their property to the new board of regents, but forgot to include the lot in Detroit where the Catholepistemiad had first been located. The court case involving the eventual recovery of this property led to the Michigan Supreme Court deciding in 1856 that the board of regents, the board of trustees, and the Didactors of the Catholepistemiad were a legally continuous entity. The Regents continued to treat 1837 as the founding year of the University of Michigan until 1929, when they reversed policy and adopted 1817 as the official founding date. That act makes the University of Michigan officially, if not actually, the oldest university in the Big Ten; in actuality, Indiana University, founded in 1820 and granting degrees before the University of Michigan was in existence, is the oldest Big Ten school.

Note: Successorship is well-defined for the ex officio Regents, but no specific predecessor/successor relationships is implied for the appointed Regents, except where specifically noted by an asterisk (*) which denotes Regents explicitly named as a successor to the previous one.

Year	Ex officio Regents								Appointed Regents											
Year	Governor	Lt. Governor	Chancellor	Supreme Court Justices					Appointed Regents											
1837	Stevens T. Mason	Edward Mundy	Elon Farnsworth	William A. Fletcher	George Morell	Epaphroditus Ransom			Thomas Fitzgerald	Ross Wilkins	John Norvell	Lucius Lyon	Isaac E. Crary	Samuel Denton	John J. Adam	Michael Hoffman	Zina Pitcher	Henry Rowe Schoolcraft	Robert McClelland	Gideon O. Whittemore
1837	Stevens T. Mason	Edward Mundy	Elon Farnsworth	William A. Fletcher	George Morell	Epaphroditus Ransom			John F. Porter*	Ross Wilkins	John Norvell	Lucius Lyon	Isaac E. Crary	Samuel Denton	John J. Adam	Michael Hoffman	Zina Pitcher	Henry Rowe Schoolcraft	Seba Murphy*	Gideon O. Whittemore
1838	Stevens T. Mason	Edward Mundy	Elon Farnsworth	William A. Fletcher	George Morell	Epaphroditus Ransom			John F. Porter*	Ross Wilkins	John Norvell	Lucius Lyon	Isaac E. Crary	Samuel Denton	John J. Adam	Michael Hoffman	Zina Pitcher	Henry Rowe Schoolcraft	Seba Murphy*	Gideon O. Whittemore
1838	Stevens T. Mason	Edward Mundy	Elon Farnsworth	William A. Fletcher	George Morell	Epaphroditus Ransom	Charles W. Whipple		Jonathan Kearsley*	Ross Wilkins	John Norvell	Lucius Lyon	Isaac E. Crary	Samuel Denton	John J. Adam	Gurdon C. Leech*	Zina Pitcher	Henry Rowe Schoolcraft	Seba Murphy*	Gideon O. Whittemore
1839	Stevens T. Mason	Edward Mundy	Elon Farnsworth	William A. Fletcher	George Morell	Epaphroditus Ransom	Charles W. Whipple		Jonathan Kearsley*	Ross Wilkins	John Norvell	Lucius Lyon	Isaac E. Crary	Samuel Denton	John J. Adam	Gurdon C. Leech*	Zina Pitcher	Henry Rowe Schoolcraft	Seba Murphy*	Gideon O. Whittemore
1839	Stevens T. Mason	Edward Mundy	Elon Farnsworth	William A. Fletcher	George Morell	Epaphroditus Ransom	Charles W. Whipple		Jonathan Kearsley*	Ross Wilkins	Charles C. Trowbridge*	George Duffield*	Isaac E. Crary	Samuel Denton	John J. Adam	Gurdon C. Leech*	Zina Pitcher	Henry Rowe Schoolcraft	Joseph W. Brown*	Gideon O. Whittemore
1840	Stevens T. Mason	Edward Mundy	Elon Farnsworth	William A. Fletcher	George Morell	Epaphroditus Ransom	Charles W. Whipple		Jonathan Kearsley*	Ross Wilkins	Charles C. Trowbridge*	George Duffield*	Isaac E. Crary	Samuel Denton	John J. Adam	Gurdon C. Leech*	Zina Pitcher	Henry Rowe Schoolcraft	Joseph W. Brown*	Gideon O. Whittemore
1840	William Woodbridge	James Wright Gordon	Elon Farnsworth	William A. Fletcher	George Morell	Epaphroditus Ransom	Charles W. Whipple		Jonathan Kearsley*	Ross Wilkins	Charles C. Trowbridge*	George Duffield*	Isaac E. Crary	Samuel W. Dexter	Michael A. Patterson*	Francis J. Higginson	Zina Pitcher	Henry Rowe Schoolcraft	Daniel Hudson*	William Draper
1841	William Woodbridge	James Wright Gordon	Elon Farnsworth	William A. Fletcher	George Morell	Epaphroditus Ransom	Charles W. Whipple		Jonathan Kearsley*	Ross Wilkins	Charles C. Trowbridge*	George Duffield*	Isaac E. Crary	Samuel W. Dexter	Michael A. Patterson*	Francis J. Higginson	Zina Pitcher	Henry Rowe Schoolcraft	Daniel Hudson*	William Draper
1841	James Wright Gordon	Thomas J. Drake?	Elon Farnsworth	William A. Fletcher	George Morell	Epaphroditus Ransom	Charles W. Whipple		Jonathan Kearsley*	Ross Wilkins	Charles C. Trowbridge*	George Duffield*	Isaac E. Crary	Oliver C. Comstock*	Michael A. Patterson*	John Owen*	Zina Pitcher	Martin Kundig	George Goodman	William Draper
1842	James Wright Gordon	Thomas J. Drake?	Elon Farnsworth	William A. Fletcher	George Morell	Epaphroditus Ransom	Charles W. Whipple		Jonathan Kearsley*	Ross Wilkins	Charles C. Trowbridge*	George Duffield*	Isaac E. Crary	Oliver C. Comstock*	Michael A. Patterson*	John Owen*	Zina Pitcher	Martin Kundig	George Goodman	William Draper
1842	John S. Barry	Origen D. Richardson	Randolph Manning	Alpheus Felch	George Morell		Charles W. Whipple		Jonathan Kearsley*	Elisha Crane	Andrew M. Fitch	George Duffield*	Isaac E. Crary	Oliver C. Comstock*	William A. Fletcher	John Owen*	Zina Pitcher	Martin Kundig	George Goodman	William Draper
1843	John S. Barry	Origen D. Richardson	Randolph Manning	Alpheus Felch	George Morell		Charles W. Whipple		Jonathan Kearsley*	Elisha Crane	Andrew M. Fitch	George Duffield*	Isaac E. Crary	Oliver C. Comstock*	William A. Fletcher	John Owen*	Zina Pitcher	Martin Kundig	George Goodman	William Draper
1843	John S. Barry	Origen D. Richardson	Randolph Manning	Alpheus Felch	Daniel Goodwin	Epaphroditus Ransom	Charles W. Whipple		Jonathan Kearsley*	Elisha Crane	Andrew M. Fitch	Marvin Allen		Lewis Cass*	William A. Fletcher	John Owen*	Zina Pitcher	Martin Kundig	Dewitt C. Walker*	William Draper
1844	John S. Barry	Origen D. Richardson	Randolph Manning	Alpheus Felch	Daniel Goodwin	Epaphroditus Ransom	Charles W. Whipple		Jonathan Kearsley*	Elisha Crane	Andrew M. Fitch	Marvin Allen		Lewis Cass*	William A. Fletcher	John Owen*	Zina Pitcher	Martin Kundig	Dewitt C. Walker*	William Draper
1844	John S. Barry	Origen D. Richardson	Randolph Manning	Alpheus Felch	Daniel Goodwin	Epaphroditus Ransom	Charles W. Whipple		Jonathan Kearsley*	Elisha Crane	Andrew M. Fitch	Marvin Allen	Alexander H. Redfield*	Edward Mundy	William A. Fletcher	John Owen*	Zina Pitcher	Martin Kundig	Robert R. Kellogg*	George Duffield
1845	John S. Barry	Origen D. Richardson	Randolph Manning	Alpheus Felch	Daniel Goodwin	Epaphroditus Ransom	Charles W. Whipple		Jonathan Kearsley*	Elisha Crane	Andrew M. Fitch	Marvin Allen	Alexander H. Redfield*	Edward Mundy	William A. Fletcher	John Owen*	Zina Pitcher	Martin Kundig	Robert R. Kellogg*	George Duffield
1845	John S. Barry	Origen D. Richardson	Randolph Manning	Warner Wing	Daniel Goodwin	Epaphroditus Ransom	Charles W. Whipple		Jonathan Kearsley*	Elisha Crane	Andrew M. Fitch	Marvin Allen	Alexander H. Redfield*	Edward Mundy	William A. Fletcher	John Owen*	Zina Pitcher	Austin E. Wing	Minot Thayer Lane	George Duffield
1846	John S. Barry	Origen D. Richardson	Randolph Manning	Warner Wing	Daniel Goodwin	Epaphroditus Ransom	Charles W. Whipple		Jonathan Kearsley*	Elisha Crane	Andrew M. Fitch	Marvin Allen	Alexander H. Redfield*	Edward Mundy	William A. Fletcher	John Owen*	Zina Pitcher	Austin E. Wing	Minot Thayer Lane	George Duffield
1846	Alpheus Felch	William L. Greenly	Elon Farnsworth	Warner Wing	George Miles	Epaphroditus Ransom	Charles W. Whipple		Jonathan Kearsley*	Charles Coffin Taylor	Elijah Holmes Pilcher	Marvin Allen	Alexander H. Redfield*	Edward Mundy	Elon Farnsworth	John Owen*	Zina Pitcher	Austin E. Wing	Minot Thayer Lane	George Duffield
1847	Alpheus Felch	William L. Greenly	(office abolished)	Warner Wing	George Miles	Epaphroditus Ransom	Charles W. Whipple		Jonathan Kearsley*	Charles Coffin Taylor	Elijah Holmes Pilcher	Marvin Allen	Alexander H. Redfield*	Edward Mundy	Elon Farnsworth	John Owen*	Zina Pitcher	Austin E. Wing	Minot Thayer Lane	George Duffield
1847	William L. Greenly	Charles P. Bush	(office abolished)	Warner Wing	George Miles	Epaphroditus Ransom	Charles W. Whipple		Jonathan Kearsley*	Charles Coffin Taylor	Elijah Holmes Pilcher	Marvin Allen	Alexander H. Redfield*	Edward Mundy	Elon Farnsworth	John Owen*	Zina Pitcher	Austin E. Wing	Minot Thayer Lane	George Duffield
1848	William L. Greenly	Charles P. Bush	(office abolished)	Warner Wing	George Miles	Epaphroditus Ransom	Charles W. Whipple		Jonathan Kearsley*	Charles Coffin Taylor	Elijah Holmes Pilcher	Marvin Allen	Alexander H. Redfield*	Edward Mundy	Elon Farnsworth	John Owen*	Zina Pitcher	Austin E. Wing	Minot Thayer Lane	George Duffield
1848	Epaphroditus Ransom	William Matthew Fenton	(office abolished)	Warner Wing	George Miles	Sanford M. Green	Charles W. Whipple	Edward Mundy	Jonathan Kearsley*	Charles Coffin Taylor	Elijah Holmes Pilcher	Marvin Allen	Alexander H. Redfield*	John Guest Atterbury	Elon Farnsworth	Justus Goodman	Zina Pitcher	Austin E. Wing	Minot Thayer Lane	Benjamin F. H. Witherell
1849	Epaphroditus Ransom	William Matthew Fenton	(office abolished)	Warner Wing	George Miles	Sanford M. Green	Charles W. Whipple	Edward Mundy	Jonathan Kearsley*	Charles Coffin Taylor	Elijah Holmes Pilcher	Marvin Allen	Alexander H. Redfield*	John Guest Atterbury	Elon Farnsworth	Justus Goodman	Zina Pitcher	Austin E. Wing	Minot Thayer Lane	Benjamin F. H. Witherell
1849	Epaphroditus Ransom	William Matthew Fenton	(office abolished)	Warner Wing	George Miles	Sanford M. Green	Charles W. Whipple	Edward Mundy	Jonathan Kearsley*	Charles Coffin Taylor	Elijah Holmes Pilcher	Marvin Allen	Alexander H. Redfield*	John Guest Atterbury	Elon Farnsworth	Justus Goodman	Zina Pitcher	Austin E. Wing	Edwin M. Cust	Benjamin F. H. Witherell
1850	Epaphroditus Ransom	William Matthew Fenton	(office abolished)	Warner Wing	George Miles	Sanford M. Green	Charles W. Whipple	Edward Mundy	Jonathan Kearsley*	Charles Coffin Taylor	Elijah Holmes Pilcher	Marvin Allen	Alexander H. Redfield*	John Guest Atterbury	Elon Farnsworth	Justus Goodman	Zina Pitcher	Austin E. Wing		Benjamin F. H. Witherell
1850	John S. Barry	William Matthew Fenton	(office abolished)	Warner Wing	Abner Pratt	Sanford M. Green	Charles W. Whipple	Edward Mundy	Jonathan Kearsley*	Robert McClelland	Elijah Holmes Pilcher	Marvin Allen	Alexander H. Redfield*	John Guest Atterbury	Elon Farnsworth	Justus Goodman	Zina Pitcher	Gustavus Lemuel Foster*	Epaphroditus Ransom*	Benjamin F. H. Witherell
1851	John S. Barry	William Matthew Fenton	(office abolished)	Warner Wing	Abner Pratt	Sanford M. Green	Charles W. Whipple		Jonathan Kearsley*	Robert McClelland	Elijah Holmes Pilcher	Marvin Allen	Alexander H. Redfield*	John Guest Atterbury	Elon Farnsworth	Justus Goodman	Zina Pitcher	Gustavus Lemuel Foster*	Epaphroditus Ransom*	Benjamin F. H. Witherell
1851	John S. Barry	William Matthew Fenton	(office abolished)	Warner Wing	Abner Pratt	Sanford M. Green		George Martin	Jonathan Kearsley*	Robert McClelland	Elijah Holmes Pilcher	Marvin Allen	Alexander H. Redfield*	John Guest Atterbury	Elon Farnsworth	Justus Goodman	Zina Pitcher	Gustavus Lemuel Foster*	Epaphroditus Ransom*	Benjamin F. H. Witherell

Source: (Bentley Historical Library 2006)

=== Elected Regents of the University of Michigan (1852–present) ===
The state constitution of 1850 made the Regents of the University of Michigan a statewide elected body, and also created the office of President of the University of Michigan, who was to be an ex officio member and preside over the Board without a vote. The first regents elected under the new system were elected in 1852.

Originally, one regent was elected from each of the eight judicial circuits in Michigan, for a six-year term, with all regents up for election simultaneously. By the time of the next election, the number of circuits had grown to ten, so ten regents were elected for the term beginning in 1858. This fluctuation in the size of the board, combined with the controversy over the regents' firing of President Henry Philip Tappan just before the end of their term in 1863, led to a new law that fixed the size of the board at eight members, elected on a statewide basis to an eight-year term, with terms staggered such that two are up for election every two years. The constitutional convention of 1908 added the Superintendent of Public Instruction as an ex officio member of the board, a move which was reversed by the constitutional convention of 1963.

Year	Ex officio Regents		Elected Regents									
Year	President	Superintendent of Public Instruction	Elected Regents									
1852	Henry Philip Tappan		Andrew Parsons	Elisha Ely	James Kingsley	Edward S. Moore	Charles H. Palmer	William Upjohn	Michael A. Patterson	Elon Farnsworth		
1853	Henry Philip Tappan		Henry H. Northrop	Elisha Ely	James Kingsley	Edward S. Moore	Charles H. Palmer	William Upjohn	Michael A. Patterson	Elon Farnsworth		
1854	Henry Philip Tappan		Henry H. Northrop	Elisha Ely	James Kingsley	Edward S. Moore	Charles H. Palmer	William Upjohn	Michael A. Patterson	Elon Farnsworth		
1855	Henry Philip Tappan		Henry H. Northrop		James Kingsley	Edward S. Moore	Charles H. Palmer	William Upjohn	Michael A. Patterson	Elon Farnsworth		
1856	Henry Philip Tappan		Henry H. Northrop		James Kingsley	Edward S. Moore	Charles H. Palmer	William Upjohn	Michael A. Patterson	Elon Farnsworth		
1857	Henry Philip Tappan		Henry H. Northrop		James Kingsley	Edward S. Moore	Charles H. Palmer	William Upjohn	Michael A. Patterson	Elon Farnsworth		
1858	Henry Philip Tappan		George W. Pack	John Van Vleck	Luke H. Parsons	Benjamin L. Baxter	Levi Bishop	George Bradley	Ebenezer Lakin Brown	James E. Johnson	Donald McIntyre	William M. Ferry
1858	Henry Philip Tappan		Henry Whiting	Oliver L. Spaulding	Luke H. Parsons	Benjamin L. Baxter	Levi Bishop	George Bradley	Ebenezer Lakin Brown	James E. Johnson	Donald McIntyre	William M. Ferry
1859	Henry Philip Tappan		Henry Whiting	Oliver L. Spaulding	Luke H. Parsons	Benjamin L. Baxter	Levi Bishop	George Bradley	Ebenezer Lakin Brown	James E. Johnson	Donald McIntyre	William M. Ferry
1860	Henry Philip Tappan		Henry Whiting	Oliver L. Spaulding	Luke H. Parsons	Benjamin L. Baxter	Levi Bishop	George Bradley	Ebenezer Lakin Brown	James E. Johnson	Donald McIntyre	William M. Ferry
1861	Henry Philip Tappan		Henry Whiting	Oliver L. Spaulding	Luke H. Parsons	Benjamin L. Baxter	Levi Bishop	George Bradley	Ebenezer Lakin Brown	James E. Johnson	Donald McIntyre	William M. Ferry
1862	Henry Philip Tappan		Henry Whiting	Oliver L. Spaulding	Luke H. Parsons	Benjamin L. Baxter	Levi Bishop	George Bradley	Ebenezer Lakin Brown	James E. Johnson	Donald McIntyre	William M. Ferry
1863	Erastus Otis Haven		Henry Whiting	Oliver L. Spaulding	Luke H. Parsons	Benjamin L. Baxter	Levi Bishop	George Bradley	Ebenezer Lakin Brown	James E. Johnson	Donald McIntyre	William M. Ferry
1864	Erastus Otis Haven		Alvah Sweetzer	James A. Sweezey	George Willard	Edward C. Walker	Thomas J. Joslin	Thomas D. Gilbert	Henry C. Knight	James E. Johnson	seats eliminated	
1865	Erastus Otis Haven		Cyrus M. Stockwell	James A. Sweezey	George Willard	Edward C. Walker	Thomas J. Joslin	Thomas D. Gilbert	Henry C. Knight	James E. Johnson	seats eliminated	
1866	Erastus Otis Haven		Cyrus M. Stockwell	James A. Sweezey	George Willard	Edward C. Walker	Thomas J. Joslin	Thomas D. Gilbert	Henry C. Knight	James E. Johnson	seats eliminated	
1867	Erastus Otis Haven		Cyrus M. Stockwell	James A. Sweezey	George Willard	Edward C. Walker	Thomas J. Joslin	Thomas D. Gilbert	John M.B. Sill	James E. Johnson	seats eliminated	
1868	Erastus Otis Haven		Cyrus M. Stockwell	James A. Sweezey	George Willard	Edward C. Walker	Hiram A. Burt	Thomas D. Gilbert	John M.B. Sill	James E. Johnson	seats eliminated	
1869	Henry Simmons Frieze		Cyrus M. Stockwell	James A. Sweezey	George Willard	Edward C. Walker	Hiram A. Burt	Thomas D. Gilbert	John M.B. Sill	James E. Johnson	seats eliminated	
1870	Henry Simmons Frieze		Cyrus M. Stockwell	James A. Sweezey	George Willard	Edward C. Walker	Hiram A. Burt	Thomas D. Gilbert	Joseph Estabrook	Jonas H. McGowan	seats eliminated	
1871	James Burrill Angell		Cyrus M. Stockwell	James A. Sweezey	George Willard	Edward C. Walker	Hiram A. Burt	Thomas D. Gilbert	Joseph Estabrook	Jonas H. McGowan	seats eliminated	
1872	James Burrill Angell		Claudius B. Grant	Charles Rynd	George Willard	Edward C. Walker	Hiram A. Burt	Thomas D. Gilbert	Joseph Estabrook	Jonas H. McGowan	seats eliminated	
1873	James Burrill Angell		Claudius B. Grant	Charles Rynd	George Willard	Edward C. Walker	Hiram A. Burt	Thomas D. Gilbert	Joseph Estabrook	Jonas H. McGowan	seats eliminated	
1874	James Burrill Angell		Claudius B. Grant	Charles Rynd	Andrew Climie	Edward C. Walker	Hiram A. Burt	Thomas D. Gilbert	Joseph Estabrook	Jonas H. McGowan	seats eliminated	
1875	James Burrill Angell		Claudius B. Grant	Charles Rynd	Andrew Climie	Edward C. Walker	Hiram A. Burt	Thomas D. Gilbert	Joseph Estabrook	Jonas H. McGowan	seats eliminated	
1876	James Burrill Angell		Claudius B. Grant	Charles Rynd	Andrew Climie	Edward C. Walker	Byron M. Cutcheon	Samuel S. Walker	Joseph Estabrook	Jonas H. McGowan	seats eliminated	
1877	James Burrill Angell		Claudius B. Grant	Charles Rynd	Andrew Climie	Edward C. Walker	Byron M. Cutcheon	Samuel S. Walker	Joseph Estabrook	Victory P. Collier	seats eliminated	
1877	James Burrill Angell		Claudius B. Grant	Charles Rynd	Andrew Climie	Edward C. Walker	Byron M. Cutcheon	Samuel S. Walker	Joseph Estabrook	George Duffield, Jr.	seats eliminated	
1878	James Burrill Angell		Claudius B. Grant	Charles Rynd	Andrew Climie	Edward C. Walker	Byron M. Cutcheon	Samuel S. Walker	George L. Maltz	George Duffield, Jr.	seats eliminated	
1879	James Burrill Angell		Claudius B. Grant	Charles Rynd	Andrew Climie	Edward C. Walker	Byron M. Cutcheon	Samuel S. Walker	George L. Maltz	George Duffield, Jr.	seats eliminated	
1880	James Burrill Angell		Ebenezer O. Grosvenor	James Shearer	Andrew Climie	Edward C. Walker	Byron M. Cutcheon	Samuel S. Walker	Jacob J. Van Riper	George Duffield, Jr.	seats eliminated	
1881	James Burrill Angell		Ebenezer O. Grosvenor	James Shearer	Austin Blair	Edward C. Walker	Byron M. Cutcheon	Samuel S. Walker	Jacob J. Van Riper	George Duffield, Jr.	seats eliminated	
1882	James Burrill Angell		Ebenezer O. Grosvenor	James Shearer	Austin Blair	James F. Joy	Byron M. Cutcheon	Samuel S. Walker	Jacob J. Van Riper	George Duffield, Jr.	seats eliminated	
1883	James Burrill Angell		Ebenezer O. Grosvenor	James Shearer	Austin Blair	James F. Joy	Lyman D. Norris	Samuel S. Walker	Jacob J. Van Riper	George Duffield, Jr.	seats eliminated	
1884	James Burrill Angell		Ebenezer O. Grosvenor	James Shearer	Austin Blair	James F. Joy	Arthur M. Clark	Charles J. Willett	Jacob J. Van Riper	George Duffield, Jr.	seats eliminated	
1885	James Burrill Angell		Ebenezer O. Grosvenor	James Shearer	Austin Blair	James F. Joy	Arthur M. Clark	Charles J. Willett	Jacob J. Van Riper	George Duffield, Jr.	seats eliminated	
1886	James Burrill Angell		Ebenezer O. Grosvenor	James Shearer	Austin Blair	Charles S. Draper	Arthur M. Clark	Charles J. Willett	Moses W. Field	Charles R. Whitman	seats eliminated	
1887	James Burrill Angell		Ebenezer O. Grosvenor	James Shearer	Austin Blair	Charles S. Draper	Arthur M. Clark	Charles J. Willett	Moses W. Field	Charles R. Whitman	seats eliminated	
1888	James Burrill Angell		Charles Hebard	Roger W. Butterfield	Austin Blair	Charles S. Draper	Arthur M. Clark	Charles J. Willett	Moses W. Field	Charles R. Whitman	seats eliminated	
1889	James Burrill Angell		Charles Hebard	Roger W. Butterfield	Austin Blair	Charles S. Draper	Arthur M. Clark	Charles J. Willett	Hermann Kiefer	Charles R. Whitman	seats eliminated	
1890	James Burrill Angell		Charles Hebard	Roger W. Butterfield	William J. Cocker	Charles S. Draper	Arthur M. Clark	Charles J. Willett	Hermann Kiefer	Charles R. Whitman	seats eliminated	
1891	James Burrill Angell		Charles Hebard	Roger W. Butterfield	William J. Cocker	Charles S. Draper	Arthur M. Clark	Charles J. Willett	Hermann Kiefer	Charles R. Whitman	seats eliminated	
1892	James Burrill Angell		Charles Hebard	Roger W. Butterfield	William J. Cocker	Levi L. Barbour	Henry Howard	Peter N. Cook	Hermann Kiefer	Charles R. Whitman	seats eliminated	
1893	James Burrill Angell		Charles Hebard	Roger W. Butterfield	William J. Cocker	Levi L. Barbour	Henry Howard	Peter N. Cook	Hermann Kiefer	Charles R. Whitman	seats eliminated	
1894	James Burrill Angell		Charles Hebard	Roger W. Butterfield	William J. Cocker	Levi L. Barbour	Henry S. Dean	Peter N. Cook	Hermann Kiefer	Frank W. Fletcher	seats eliminated	
1895	James Burrill Angell		Charles Hebard	Roger W. Butterfield	William J. Cocker	Levi L. Barbour	Henry S. Dean	Peter N. Cook	Hermann Kiefer	Frank W. Fletcher	seats eliminated	
1896	James Burrill Angell		Charles H. Hackley	Roger W. Butterfield	William J. Cocker	Levi L. Barbour	Henry S. Dean	Peter N. Cook	Hermann Kiefer	Frank W. Fletcher	seats eliminated	
1896	James Burrill Angell		George A. Farr	Roger W. Butterfield	William J. Cocker	Levi L. Barbour	Henry S. Dean	Peter N. Cook	Hermann Kiefer	Frank W. Fletcher	seats eliminated	
1897	Harry Burns Hutchins		George A. Farr	Roger W. Butterfield	William J. Cocker	Levi L. Barbour	Henry S. Dean	Peter N. Cook	Hermann Kiefer	Frank W. Fletcher	seats eliminated	
1898	James Burrill Angell		George A. Farr	Roger W. Butterfield	William J. Cocker	Charles D. Lawton	Henry S. Dean	Peter N. Cook	Hermann Kiefer	Frank W. Fletcher	seats eliminated	
1899	James Burrill Angell		George A. Farr	Roger W. Butterfield	William J. Cocker	Charles D. Lawton	Henry S. Dean	Peter N. Cook	Hermann Kiefer	Frank W. Fletcher	seats eliminated	
1900	James Burrill Angell		George A. Farr	Roger W. Butterfield	William J. Cocker	Charles D. Lawton	Henry S. Dean	Eli R. Sutton	Hermann Kiefer	Frank W. Fletcher	seats eliminated	
1901	James Burrill Angell		George A. Farr	Roger W. Butterfield	Arthur Hill	Charles D. Lawton	Henry S. Dean	Eli R. Sutton	Hermann Kiefer	Frank W. Fletcher	seats eliminated	
1902	James Burrill Angell		George A. Farr	Roger W. Butterfield	Arthur Hill	Charles D. Lawton	Henry S. Dean	Levi L. Barbour	Henry W. Carey	Frank W. Fletcher	seats eliminated	
1903	James Burrill Angell		George A. Farr	Roger W. Butterfield	Arthur Hill	Charles D. Lawton	Henry S. Dean	Levi L. Barbour	Henry W. Carey	Frank W. Fletcher	seats eliminated	
1904	James Burrill Angell		Peter White	Loyal Edwin Knappen	Arthur Hill	Charles D. Lawton	Henry S. Dean	Levi L. Barbour	Henry W. Carey	Frank W. Fletcher	seats eliminated	
1905	James Burrill Angell		Peter White	Loyal Edwin Knappen	Arthur Hill	Charles D. Lawton	Henry S. Dean	Levi L. Barbour	Henry W. Carey	Frank W. Fletcher	seats eliminated	
1906	James Burrill Angell		Peter White	Loyal Edwin Knappen	Arthur Hill	Walter H. Sawyer	Henry S. Dean	Levi L. Barbour	Henry W. Carey	Frank W. Fletcher	seats eliminated	
1907	James Burrill Angell		Peter White	Loyal Edwin Knappen	Arthur Hill	Walter H. Sawyer	Henry S. Dean	Levi L. Barbour	Henry W. Carey	Frank W. Fletcher	seats eliminated	
1908	James Burrill Angell		Chase S. Osborn	Loyal Edwin Knappen	Arthur Hill	Walter H. Sawyer	Frank B. Leland	Junius E. Beal	Henry W. Carey	Frank W. Fletcher	seats eliminated	
1909	Harry Burns Hutchins	Luther L. Wright	Chase S. Osborn	Loyal Edwin Knappen	John H. Grant	Walter H. Sawyer	Frank B. Leland	Junius E. Beal	Henry W. Carey	Frank W. Fletcher	seats eliminated	
1910	Harry Burns Hutchins	Luther L. Wright	Chase S. Osborn	Loyal Edwin Knappen	John H. Grant	Walter H. Sawyer	Frank B. Leland	Junius E. Beal	George P. Codd	William L. Clements	seats eliminated	
1911	Harry Burns Hutchins	Luther L. Wright	Lucius L. Hubbard	Benjamin S. Hanchett	John H. Grant	Walter H. Sawyer	Frank B. Leland	Junius E. Beal	Harry C. Bulkley	William L. Clements	seats eliminated	
1912	Harry Burns Hutchins	Luther L. Wright	Lucius L. Hubbard	Benjamin S. Hanchett	John H. Grant	Walter H. Sawyer	Frank B. Leland	Junius E. Beal	Harry C. Bulkley	William L. Clements	seats eliminated	
1913	Harry Burns Hutchins	Fred L. Keeler	Lucius L. Hubbard	Benjamin S. Hanchett	William A. Comstock	Walter H. Sawyer	Frank B. Leland	Junius E. Beal	Harry C. Bulkley	William L. Clements	seats eliminated	
1914	Harry Burns Hutchins	Fred L. Keeler	Lucius L. Hubbard	Benjamin S. Hanchett	Victor M. Gore	Walter H. Sawyer	Frank B. Leland	Junius E. Beal	Harry C. Bulkley	William L. Clements	seats eliminated	
1915	Harry Burns Hutchins	Fred L. Keeler	Lucius L. Hubbard	Benjamin S. Hanchett	Victor M. Gore	Walter H. Sawyer	Frank B. Leland	Junius E. Beal	Harry C. Bulkley	William L. Clements	seats eliminated	
1916	Harry Burns Hutchins	Fred L. Keeler	Lucius L. Hubbard	Benjamin S. Hanchett	Victor M. Gore	Walter H. Sawyer	Frank B. Leland	Junius E. Beal	Harry C. Bulkley	William L. Clements	seats eliminated	
1917	Harry Burns Hutchins	Fred L. Keeler	Lucius L. Hubbard	Benjamin S. Hanchett	Victor M. Gore	Walter H. Sawyer	Frank B. Leland	Junius E. Beal	Harry C. Bulkley	William L. Clements	seats eliminated	
1918	Harry Burns Hutchins	Fred L. Keeler	Lucius L. Hubbard	Benjamin S. Hanchett	Victor M. Gore	Walter H. Sawyer	Frank B. Leland	Junius E. Beal	James O. Murfin	William L. Clements	seats eliminated	
1919	Harry Burns Hutchins	Thomas E. Johnson	Lucius L. Hubbard	Benjamin S. Hanchett	Victor M. Gore	Walter H. Sawyer	Frank B. Leland	Junius E. Beal	James O. Murfin	William L. Clements	seats eliminated	
1920	Marion LeRoy Burton	Thomas E. Johnson	Lucius L. Hubbard	Benjamin S. Hanchett	Victor M. Gore	Walter H. Sawyer	Frank B. Leland	Junius E. Beal	James O. Murfin	William L. Clements	seats eliminated	
1921	Marion LeRoy Burton	Thomas E. Johnson	Lucius L. Hubbard	Benjamin S. Hanchett	Victor M. Gore	Walter H. Sawyer	Frank B. Leland	Junius E. Beal	James O. Murfin	William L. Clements	seats eliminated	
1922	Marion LeRoy Burton	Thomas E. Johnson	Lucius L. Hubbard	Benjamin S. Hanchett	Victor M. Gore	Walter H. Sawyer	Frank B. Leland	Junius E. Beal	James O. Murfin	William L. Clements	seats eliminated	
1923	Marion LeRoy Burton	Thomas E. Johnson	Lucius L. Hubbard	Benjamin S. Hanchett	Victor M. Gore	Walter H. Sawyer	Frank B. Leland	Junius E. Beal	James O. Murfin	William L. Clements	seats eliminated	
1924	Marion LeRoy Burton	Thomas E. Johnson	Lucius L. Hubbard	Benjamin S. Hanchett	Victor M. Gore	Walter H. Sawyer	Ralph Stone	Junius E. Beal	James O. Murfin	William L. Clements	seats eliminated	
1925	Alfred Henry Lloyd	Thomas E. Johnson	Lucius L. Hubbard	Benjamin S. Hanchett	Victor M. Gore	Walter H. Sawyer	Ralph Stone	Junius E. Beal	James O. Murfin	William L. Clements	seats eliminated	
1925	C. C. Little	Thomas E. Johnson	Lucius L. Hubbard	Benjamin S. Hanchett	Victor M. Gore	Walter H. Sawyer	Ralph Stone	Junius E. Beal	James O. Murfin	William L. Clements	seats eliminated	
1926	C. C. Little	Wilford L. Coffey	Lucius L. Hubbard	Benjamin S. Hanchett	Victor M. Gore	Walter H. Sawyer	Ralph Stone	Junius E. Beal	James O. Murfin	William L. Clements	seats eliminated	
1927	C. C. Little	Webster H. Pearce	Lucius L. Hubbard	Benjamin S. Hanchett	Victor M. Gore	Walter H. Sawyer	Ralph Stone	Junius E. Beal	James O. Murfin	William L. Clements	seats eliminated	
1928	C. C. Little	Webster H. Pearce	Lucius L. Hubbard	Benjamin S. Hanchett	Victor M. Gore	Walter H. Sawyer	Ralph Stone	Junius E. Beal	James O. Murfin	William L. Clements	seats eliminated	
1929	Alexander Grant Ruthven	Webster H. Pearce	Lucius L. Hubbard	Esther M. Cram	Victor M. Gore	Walter H. Sawyer	Ralph Stone	Junius E. Beal	James O. Murfin	William L. Clements	seats eliminated	
1930	Alexander Grant Ruthven	Webster H. Pearce	Lucius L. Hubbard	Esther M. Cram	R. Perry Shorts	Walter H. Sawyer	Ralph Stone	Junius E. Beal	James O. Murfin	William L. Clements	seats eliminated	
1931	Alexander Grant Ruthven	Webster H. Pearce	Lucius L. Hubbard	Esther M. Cram	R. Perry Shorts	Richard R. Smith	Ralph Stone	Junius E. Beal	James O. Murfin	William L. Clements	seats eliminated	
1932	Alexander Grant Ruthven	Webster H. Pearce	Lucius L. Hubbard	Esther M. Cram	R. Perry Shorts	Richard R. Smith	Ralph Stone	Junius E. Beal	James O. Murfin	William L. Clements	seats eliminated	
1933	Alexander Grant Ruthven	Paul F. Voelker	Edmund C. Shields	Esther M. Cram	R. Perry Shorts	Richard R. Smith	Ralph Stone	Junius E. Beal	James O. Murfin	William L. Clements	seats eliminated	
1934	Alexander Grant Ruthven	Paul F. Voelker	Edmund C. Shields	Esther M. Cram	James O. Murfin	Richard R. Smith	Ralph Stone	Junius E. Beal	Charles F. Hemans	Franklin M. Cook	seats eliminated	
1935	Alexander Grant Ruthven	Maurice R. Keyworth	Edmund C. Shields	Esther M. Cram	James O. Murfin	Richard R. Smith	Ralph Stone	Junius E. Beal	Charles F. Hemans	Franklin M. Cook	seats eliminated	
1935	Alexander Grant Ruthven	Eugene B. Elliott	Edmund C. Shields	Esther M. Cram	James O. Murfin	Richard R. Smith	Ralph Stone	Junius E. Beal	Charles F. Hemans	Franklin M. Cook	seats eliminated	
1936	Alexander Grant Ruthven	Eugene B. Elliott	David H. Crowley	Esther M. Cram	James O. Murfin	Richard R. Smith	Ralph Stone	Junius E. Beal	Charles F. Hemans	Franklin M. Cook	seats eliminated	
1937	Alexander Grant Ruthven	Eugene B. Elliott	David H. Crowley	Esther M. Cram	James O. Murfin	Richard R. Smith	Ralph Stone	Junius E. Beal	Charles F. Hemans	Franklin M. Cook	seats eliminated	
1938	Alexander Grant Ruthven	Eugene B. Elliott	David H. Crowley	Esther M. Cram	Edmund C. Shields	John D. Lynch	Ralph Stone	Junius E. Beal	Charles F. Hemans	Franklin M. Cook	seats eliminated	
1939	Alexander Grant Ruthven	Eugene B. Elliott	David H. Crowley	Esther M. Cram	Edmund C. Shields	John D. Lynch	Ralph Stone	Junius E. Beal	Charles F. Hemans	Franklin M. Cook	seats eliminated	
1940	Alexander Grant Ruthven	Eugene B. Elliott	David H. Crowley	Esther M. Cram	Edmund C. Shields	John D. Lynch	Harry Kipke	J. Joseph Herbert	Charles F. Hemans	Franklin M. Cook	seats eliminated	
1941	Alexander Grant Ruthven	Eugene B. Elliott	David H. Crowley	Esther M. Cram	Edmund C. Shields	John D. Lynch	Harry Kipke	J. Joseph Herbert	Charles F. Hemans	Franklin M. Cook	seats eliminated	
1942	Alexander Grant Ruthven	Eugene B. Elliott	David H. Crowley	Esther M. Cram	Edmund C. Shields	John D. Lynch	Harry Kipke	J. Joseph Herbert	Earl L. Burhans	Alfred B. Connable	seats eliminated	
1942	Alexander Grant Ruthven	Eugene B. Elliott	David H. Crowley	Esther M. Cram	Edmund C. Shields	John D. Lynch	Harry Kipke	J. Joseph Herbert	Franklin M. Cook	Alfred B. Connable	seats eliminated	
1943	Alexander Grant Ruthven	Eugene B. Elliott	David H. Crowley	Esther M. Cram	Edmund C. Shields	John D. Lynch	Harry Kipke	J. Joseph Herbert	Vera B. Baits	Alfred B. Connable	seats eliminated	
1944	Alexander Grant Ruthven	Eugene B. Elliott	Ralph A. Hayward	R. Spencer Bishop	Edmund C. Shields	John D. Lynch	Harry Kipke	J. Joseph Herbert	Vera B. Baits	Alfred B. Connable	seats eliminated	
1945	Alexander Grant Ruthven	Eugene B. Elliott	Ralph A. Hayward	R. Spencer Bishop	Edmund C. Shields	John D. Lynch	Harry Kipke	J. Joseph Herbert	Vera B. Baits	Alfred B. Connable	seats eliminated	
1946	Alexander Grant Ruthven	Eugene B. Elliott	Ralph A. Hayward	Roscoe O. Bonisteel	Otto E. Eckert	Charles S. Kennedy	Harry Kipke	J. Joseph Herbert	Vera B. Baits	Alfred B. Connable	seats eliminated	
1947	Alexander Grant Ruthven	Eugene B. Elliott	Ralph A. Hayward	Roscoe O. Bonisteel	Otto E. Eckert	Charles S. Kennedy	Harry Kipke	J. Joseph Herbert	Vera B. Baits	Alfred B. Connable	seats eliminated	
1948	Alexander Grant Ruthven	Eugene B. Elliott	Ralph A. Hayward	Roscoe O. Bonisteel	Otto E. Eckert	Charles S. Kennedy	Kenneth M. Stevens	J. Joseph Herbert	Vera B. Baits	Alfred B. Connable	seats eliminated	
1949	Alexander Grant Ruthven	Lee M. Thurston	Ralph A. Hayward	Roscoe O. Bonisteel	Otto E. Eckert	Charles S. Kennedy	Kenneth M. Stevens	J. Joseph Herbert	Vera B. Baits	Alfred B. Connable	seats eliminated	
1950	Alexander Grant Ruthven	Lee M. Thurston	Ralph A. Hayward	Roscoe O. Bonisteel	Otto E. Eckert	Charles S. Kennedy	Kenneth M. Stevens	J. Joseph Herbert	Vera B. Baits	Alfred B. Connable	seats eliminated	
1951	Harlan Hatcher	Lee M. Thurston	Murray D. Van Wagoner	Roscoe O. Bonisteel	Otto E. Eckert	Charles S. Kennedy	Kenneth M. Stevens	J. Joseph Herbert	Vera B. Baits	Alfred B. Connable	seats eliminated	
1952	Harlan Hatcher	Lee M. Thurston	Leland I. Doan	Roscoe O. Bonisteel	Otto E. Eckert	Charles S. Kennedy	Kenneth M. Stevens	J. Joseph Herbert	Vera B. Baits	Alfred B. Connable	seats eliminated	
1953	Harlan Hatcher	Clair L. Taylor	Leland I. Doan	Roscoe O. Bonisteel	Otto E. Eckert	Charles S. Kennedy	Kenneth M. Stevens	J. Joseph Herbert	Vera B. Baits	Alfred B. Connable	seats eliminated	
1954	Harlan Hatcher	Clair L. Taylor	Leland I. Doan	Roscoe O. Bonisteel	Otto E. Eckert	Charles S. Kennedy	Kenneth M. Stevens	J. Joseph Herbert	Vera B. Baits	Alfred B. Connable	seats eliminated	
1955	Harlan Hatcher	Clair L. Taylor	Leland I. Doan	Roscoe O. Bonisteel	Otto E. Eckert	Charles S. Kennedy	Kenneth M. Stevens	J. Joseph Herbert	Vera B. Baits	Alfred B. Connable	seats eliminated	
1956	Harlan Hatcher	Clair L. Taylor	Leland I. Doan	Roscoe O. Bonisteel	Otto E. Eckert	Charles S. Kennedy	Paul L. Adams	Eugene B. Power	Vera B. Baits	Alfred B. Connable	seats eliminated	
1957	Harlan Hatcher	Lynn M. Bartlett	Leland I. Doan	Roscoe O. Bonisteel	Otto E. Eckert	Charles S. Kennedy	Paul L. Adams	Eugene B. Power	Vera B. Baits	Alfred B. Connable	seats eliminated	
1958	Harlan Hatcher	Lynn M. Bartlett	Leland I. Doan	Roscoe O. Bonisteel	Otto E. Eckert	Charles S. Kennedy	Donald M.D. Thurber	Eugene B. Power	Carl Brablec	Irene Ellis Murphy	seats eliminated	
1959	Harlan Hatcher	Lynn M. Bartlett	Leland I. Doan	Roscoe O. Bonisteel	Otto E. Eckert	Charles S. Kennedy	Donald M.D. Thurber	Eugene B. Power	Carl Brablec	Irene Ellis Murphy	seats eliminated	
1960	Harlan Hatcher	Lynn M. Bartlett	Frederick C. Matthaei, Sr.	William K. McInally	Otto E. Eckert	Charles S. Kennedy	Donald M.D. Thurber	Eugene B. Power	Carl Brablec	Irene Ellis Murphy	seats eliminated	
1961	Harlan Hatcher	Lynn M. Bartlett	Frederick C. Matthaei, Sr.	William K. McInally	Otto E. Eckert	Charles S. Kennedy	Donald M.D. Thurber	Eugene B. Power	Carl Brablec	Irene Ellis Murphy	seats eliminated	
1962	Harlan Hatcher	Lynn M. Bartlett	Frederick C. Matthaei, Sr.	William K. McInally	Allan R. Sorenson	Paul G. Goebel	Donald M.D. Thurber	Eugene B. Power	Carl Brablec	Irene Ellis Murphy	seats eliminated	
1963	Harlan Hatcher	(no longer ex officio Regent)	Frederick C. Matthaei, Sr.	William K. McInally	Allan R. Sorenson	Paul G. Goebel	Donald M.D. Thurber	Eugene B. Power	Carl Brablec	Irene Ellis Murphy	seats eliminated	
1964	Harlan Hatcher	(no longer ex officio Regent)	Frederick C. Matthaei, Sr.	Robert P. Briggs	Allan R. Sorenson	Paul G. Goebel	William B. Cudlip	Eugene B. Power	Carl Brablec	Irene Ellis Murphy	seats eliminated	
1965	Harlan Hatcher	(no longer ex officio Regent)	Frederick C. Matthaei, Sr.	Robert P. Briggs	Allan R. Sorenson	Paul G. Goebel	William B. Cudlip	Eugene B. Power	Carl Brablec	Irene Ellis Murphy	seats eliminated	
1966	Harlan Hatcher	(no longer ex officio Regent)	Frederick C. Matthaei, Sr.	Robert P. Briggs	Allan R. Sorenson	Paul G. Goebel	William B. Cudlip	Alvin M. Bentley	Carl Brablec	Irene Ellis Murphy	seats eliminated	
1967	Harlan Hatcher	(no longer ex officio Regent)	Frederick C. Matthaei, Jr.	Robert P. Briggs	Otis M. Smith	Paul G. Goebel	William B. Cudlip	Alvin M. Bentley	Robert J. Brown	Gertrude V. Huebner	seats eliminated	
1968	Robben Wright Fleming	(no longer ex officio Regent)	Frederick C. Matthaei, Jr.	Lawrence B. Lindemer	Otis M. Smith	Paul G. Goebel	William B. Cudlip	Alvin M. Bentley	Robert J. Brown	Gertrude V. Huebner	seats eliminated	
1969	Robben Wright Fleming	(no longer ex officio Regent)	Robert E. Nederlander	Gerald R. Dunn	Otis M. Smith	Paul G. Goebel	William B. Cudlip	Lawrence B. Lindemer	Robert J. Brown	Gertrude V. Huebner	seats eliminated	
1970	Robben Wright Fleming	(no longer ex officio Regent)	Robert E. Nederlander	Gerald R. Dunn	Otis M. Smith	Paul G. Goebel	William B. Cudlip	Lawrence B. Lindemer	Robert J. Brown	Gertrude V. Huebner	seats eliminated	
1971	Robben Wright Fleming	(no longer ex officio Regent)	Robert E. Nederlander	Gerald R. Dunn	James L. Waters	Paul W. Brown	William B. Cudlip	Lawrence B. Lindemer	Robert J. Brown	Gertrude V. Huebner	seats eliminated	
1972	Robben Wright Fleming	(no longer ex officio Regent)	Robert E. Nederlander	Gerald R. Dunn	James L. Waters	Paul W. Brown	William B. Cudlip	Lawrence B. Lindemer	Robert J. Brown	Gertrude V. Huebner	seats eliminated	
1973	Robben Wright Fleming	(no longer ex officio Regent)	Robert E. Nederlander	Gerald R. Dunn	James L. Waters	Paul W. Brown	Deane Baker	Lawrence B. Lindemer	Robert J. Brown	Gertrude V. Huebner	seats eliminated	
1974	Robben Wright Fleming	(no longer ex officio Regent)	Robert E. Nederlander	Gerald R. Dunn	James L. Waters	Paul W. Brown	Deane Baker	Lawrence B. Lindemer	Robert J. Brown	Gertrude V. Huebner	seats eliminated	
1975	Robben Wright Fleming	(no longer ex officio Regent)	Robert E. Nederlander	Gerald R. Dunn	James L. Waters	Paul W. Brown	Deane Baker	David Laro	Sarah Goddard Power	Thomas A. Roach	seats eliminated	
1976	Robben Wright Fleming	(no longer ex officio Regent)	Robert E. Nederlander	Gerald R. Dunn	James L. Waters	Paul W. Brown	Deane Baker	David Laro	Sarah Goddard Power	Thomas A. Roach	seats eliminated	
1977	Robben Wright Fleming	(no longer ex officio Regent)	Robert E. Nederlander	Gerald R. Dunn	James L. Waters	Paul W. Brown	Deane Baker	David Laro	Sarah Goddard Power	Thomas A. Roach	seats eliminated	
1978	Robben Wright Fleming	(no longer ex officio Regent)	Robert E. Nederlander	Gerald R. Dunn	James L. Waters	Paul W. Brown	Deane Baker	David Laro	Sarah Goddard Power	Thomas A. Roach	seats eliminated	
1979	Allan F. Smith	(no longer ex officio Regent)	Robert E. Nederlander	Gerald R. Dunn	James L. Waters	Paul W. Brown	Deane Baker	David Laro	Sarah Goddard Power	Thomas A. Roach	seats eliminated	
1980	Harold Tafler Shapiro	(no longer ex officio Regent)	Robert E. Nederlander	Gerald R. Dunn	James L. Waters	Paul W. Brown	Deane Baker	David Laro	Sarah Goddard Power	Thomas A. Roach	seats eliminated	
1981	Harold Tafler Shapiro	(no longer ex officio Regent)	Robert E. Nederlander	Gerald R. Dunn	James L. Waters	Paul W. Brown	Deane Baker	Nellie M. Varner	Sarah Goddard Power	Thomas A. Roach	seats eliminated	
1982	Harold Tafler Shapiro	(no longer ex officio Regent)	Robert E. Nederlander	Gerald R. Dunn	James L. Waters	Paul W. Brown	Deane Baker	Nellie M. Varner	Sarah Goddard Power	Thomas A. Roach	seats eliminated	
1983	Harold Tafler Shapiro	(no longer ex officio Regent)	Robert E. Nederlander	Gerald R. Dunn	James L. Waters	Paul W. Brown	Deane Baker	Nellie M. Varner	Sarah Goddard Power	Thomas A. Roach	seats eliminated	
1984	Harold Tafler Shapiro	(no longer ex officio Regent)	Robert E. Nederlander	Gerald R. Dunn	James L. Waters	Paul W. Brown	Deane Baker	Nellie M. Varner	Sarah Goddard Power	Thomas A. Roach	seats eliminated	
1985	Harold Tafler Shapiro	(no longer ex officio Regent)	Veronica Latta Smith	Neal D. Nielson	James L. Waters	Paul W. Brown	Deane Baker	Nellie M. Varner	Sarah Goddard Power	Thomas A. Roach	seats eliminated	
1986	Harold Tafler Shapiro	(no longer ex officio Regent)	Veronica Latta Smith	Neal D. Nielson	James L. Waters	Paul W. Brown	Deane Baker	Nellie M. Varner	Sarah Goddard Power	Thomas A. Roach	seats eliminated	
1987	Harold Tafler Shapiro	(no longer ex officio Regent)	Veronica Latta Smith	Neal D. Nielson	James L. Waters	Paul W. Brown	Deane Baker	Nellie M. Varner	Philip H. Power	Thomas A. Roach	seats eliminated	
1988	James Johnson Duderstadt	(no longer ex officio Regent)	Veronica Latta Smith	Neal D. Nielson	James L. Waters	Paul W. Brown	Deane Baker	Nellie M. Varner	Philip H. Power	Thomas A. Roach	seats eliminated	
1989	James Johnson Duderstadt	(no longer ex officio Regent)	Veronica Latta Smith	Neal D. Nielson	James L. Waters	Paul W. Brown	Deane Baker	Nellie M. Varner	Philip H. Power	Thomas A. Roach	seats eliminated	
1990	James Johnson Duderstadt	(no longer ex officio Regent)	Veronica Latta Smith	Neal D. Nielson	James L. Waters	Paul W. Brown	Deane Baker	Nellie M. Varner	Philip H. Power	Thomas A. Roach	seats eliminated	
1991	James Johnson Duderstadt	(no longer ex officio Regent)	Veronica Latta Smith	Neal D. Nielson	James L. Waters	Paul W. Brown	Deane Baker	Nellie M. Varner	Philip H. Power	Shirley M. McFee	seats eliminated	
1992	James Johnson Duderstadt	(no longer ex officio Regent)	Veronica Latta Smith	Neal D. Nielson	James L. Waters	Paul W. Brown	Deane Baker	Nellie M. Varner	Philip H. Power	Shirley M. McFee	seats eliminated	
1993	James Johnson Duderstadt	(no longer ex officio Regent)	Laurence B. Deitch	Rebecca McGowan	James L. Waters	Paul W. Brown	Deane Baker	Nellie M. Varner	Philip H. Power	Shirley M. McFee	seats eliminated	
1994	James Johnson Duderstadt	(no longer ex officio Regent)	Laurence B. Deitch	Rebecca McGowan	James L. Waters	Paul W. Brown	Deane Baker	Nellie M. Varner	Philip H. Power	Shirley M. McFee	seats eliminated	
1995	James Johnson Duderstadt	(no longer ex officio Regent)	Laurence B. Deitch	Rebecca McGowan	Andrea F. Newman	Daniel D. Horning	Deane Baker	Nellie M. Varner	Philip H. Power	Shirley M. McFee	seats eliminated	
1996	Homer Neal	(no longer ex officio Regent)	Laurence B. Deitch	Rebecca McGowan	Andrea F. Newman	Daniel D. Horning	Deane Baker	Nellie M. Varner	Philip H. Power	Shirley M. McFee	seats eliminated	
1996	Lee C. Bollinger	(no longer ex officio Regent)	Laurence B. Deitch	Rebecca McGowan	Andrea F. Newman	Daniel D. Horning	Deane Baker	Nellie M. Varner	Philip H. Power	Shirley M. McFee	seats eliminated	
1997	Lee C. Bollinger	(no longer ex officio Regent)	Laurence B. Deitch	Rebecca McGowan	Andrea F. Newman	Daniel D. Horning	Olivia P. Maynard	S. Martin Taylor	Philip H. Power	Shirley M. McFee	seats eliminated	
1998	Lee C. Bollinger	(no longer ex officio Regent)	Laurence B. Deitch	Rebecca McGowan	Andrea F. Newman	Daniel D. Horning	Olivia P. Maynard	S. Martin Taylor	Philip H. Power	Shirley M. McFee	seats eliminated	
1999	Lee C. Bollinger	(no longer ex officio Regent)	Laurence B. Deitch	Rebecca McGowan	Andrea F. Newman	Daniel D. Horning	Olivia P. Maynard	S. Martin Taylor	Dave Brandon	Katherine E. White	seats eliminated	
2000	Lee C. Bollinger	(no longer ex officio Regent)	Laurence B. Deitch	Rebecca McGowan	Andrea F. Newman	Daniel D. Horning	Olivia P. Maynard	S. Martin Taylor	Dave Brandon	Katherine E. White	seats eliminated	
2001	Lee C. Bollinger	(no longer ex officio Regent)	Laurence B. Deitch	Rebecca McGowan	Andrea F. Newman	Daniel D. Horning	Olivia P. Maynard	S. Martin Taylor	Dave Brandon	Katherine E. White	seats eliminated	
2002	B. Joseph White	(no longer ex officio Regent)	Laurence B. Deitch	Rebecca McGowan	Andrea F. Newman	Daniel D. Horning	Olivia P. Maynard	S. Martin Taylor	Dave Brandon	Katherine E. White	seats eliminated	
2002	Mary Sue Coleman	(no longer ex officio Regent)	Laurence B. Deitch	Rebecca McGowan	Andrea F. Newman		Olivia P. Maynard	S. Martin Taylor	Dave Brandon	Katherine E. White	seats eliminated	
2003	Mary Sue Coleman	(no longer ex officio Regent)	Laurence B. Deitch	Rebecca McGowan	Andrea F. Newman	Andrew Richner	Olivia P. Maynard	S. Martin Taylor	Dave Brandon	Katherine E. White	seats eliminated	
2004	Mary Sue Coleman	(no longer ex officio Regent)	Laurence B. Deitch	Rebecca McGowan	Andrea F. Newman	Andrew Richner	Olivia P. Maynard	S. Martin Taylor	Dave Brandon	Katherine E. White	seats eliminated	
2005	Mary Sue Coleman	(no longer ex officio Regent)	Laurence B. Deitch	Rebecca McGowan	Andrea F. Newman	Andrew Richner	Olivia P. Maynard	S. Martin Taylor	Dave Brandon	Katherine E. White	seats eliminated	
2006	Mary Sue Coleman	(no longer ex officio Regent)	Laurence B. Deitch	Rebecca McGowan	Andrea F. Newman	Andrew Richner	Olivia P. Maynard	S. Martin Taylor	Dave Brandon	Katherine E. White	seats eliminated	
2007	Mary Sue Coleman	(no longer ex officio Regent)	Laurence B. Deitch	Rebecca McGowan	Andrea F. Newman	Andrew Richner	Olivia P. Maynard	S. Martin Taylor	Julia Donovan Darlow	Katherine E. White	seats eliminated	
2008	Mary Sue Coleman	(no longer ex officio Regent)	Laurence B. Deitch	Rebecca McGowan	Andrea F. Newman	Andrew Richner	Olivia P. Maynard	S. Martin Taylor	Julia Donovan Darlow	Katherine E. White	seats eliminated	
2009	Mary Sue Coleman	(no longer ex officio Regent)	Laurence B. Deitch	Denise Ilitch	Andrea F. Newman	Andrew Richner	Olivia P. Maynard	S. Martin Taylor	Julia Donovan Darlow	Katherine E. White	seats eliminated	
2010	Mary Sue Coleman	(no longer ex officio Regent)	Laurence B. Deitch	Denise Ilitch	Andrea F. Newman	Andrew Richner	Olivia P. Maynard	S. Martin Taylor	Julia Donovan Darlow	Katherine E. White	seats eliminated	
2011	Mary Sue Coleman	(no longer ex officio Regent)	Laurence B. Deitch	Denise Ilitch	Andrea F. Newman	Andrew Richner	Olivia P. Maynard	S. Martin Taylor	Julia Donovan Darlow	Katherine E. White	seats eliminated	
2012	Mary Sue Coleman	(no longer ex officio Regent)	Laurence B. Deitch	Denise Ilitch	Andrea F. Newman	Andrew Richner	Olivia P. Maynard	S. Martin Taylor	Julia Donovan Darlow	Katherine E. White	seats eliminated	
2013	Mary Sue Coleman	(no longer ex officio Regent)	Laurence B. Deitch	Denise Ilitch	Andrea F. Newman	Andrew Richner	Mark Bernstein	Shauna Ryder-Diggs	Julia Donovan Darlow	Katherine E. White	seats eliminated	
2014	Mark Schlissel	(no longer ex officio Regent)	Laurence B. Deitch	Denise Ilitch	Andrea F. Newman	Andrew Richner	Mark Bernstein	Shauna Ryder-Diggs	Julia Donovan Darlow	Katherine E. White	seats eliminated	
2015	Mark Schlissel	(no longer ex officio Regent)	Laurence B. Deitch	Denise Ilitch	Andrea F. Newman	Andrew Richner	Mark Bernstein	Shauna Ryder-Diggs	Mike Behm	Katherine E. White	seats eliminated	
2016	Mark Schlissel	(no longer ex officio Regent)	Laurence B. Deitch	Denise Ilitch	Andrea F. Newman	Andrew Richner	Mark Bernstein	Shauna Ryder-Diggs	Mike Behm	Katherine E. White	seats eliminated	
2017	Mark Schlissel	(no longer ex officio Regent)	Ron Weiser	Denise Ilitch	Andrea F. Newman	Andrew Richner	Mark Bernstein	Shauna Ryder-Diggs	Mike Behm	Katherine E. White	seats eliminated	
2018	Mark Schlissel	(no longer ex officio Regent)	Ron Weiser	Denise Ilitch	Andrea F. Newman	Andrew Richner	Mark Bernstein	Shauna Ryder-Diggs	Mike Behm	Katherine E. White	seats eliminated	
2019	Mark Schlissel	(no longer ex officio Regent)	Ron Weiser	Denise Ilitch	Jordan B. Acker	Paul W. Brown	Mark Bernstein	Shauna Ryder-Diggs	Mike Behm	Katherine E. White	seats eliminated	
2020	Mark Schlissel	(no longer ex officio Regent)	Ron Weiser	Denise Ilitch	Jordan B. Acker	Paul W. Brown	Mark Bernstein	Shauna Ryder-Diggs	Mike Behm	Katherine E. White	seats eliminated	
2021	Mark Schlissel	(no longer ex officio Regent)	Ron Weiser	Denise Ilitch	Jordan B. Acker	Paul W. Brown	Mark Bernstein	Sarah Hubbard	Mike Behm	Katherine E. White	seats eliminated	
2022	Santa Ono	(no longer ex officio Regent)	Ron Weiser	Denise Ilitch	Jordan B. Acker	Paul W. Brown	Mark Bernstein	Sarah Hubbard	Mike Behm	Katherine E. White	seats eliminated	
2023	Santa Ono	(no longer ex officio Regent)	Ron Weiser	Denise Ilitch	Jordan B. Acker	Paul W. Brown	Mark Bernstein	Sarah Hubbard	Mike Behm	Katherine E. White	seats eliminated	
Next election	n/a		2024		2026		2028		2030		seats eliminated	

Source: Names and dates (Bentley Historical Library 2006), party affiliations (Kestenbaum)
