= Carl Meyers =

American politician

Regent of the University of Michigan
- Incumbent
- Assumed office January 1, 2025
- Governor: Gretchen Whitmer

Personal details
- Party: Republican
- Education: University of Michigan–Dearborn (BS)

Carl Meyers is an American investment manager and politician serving as a regent of the University of Michigan since 2025. He is a member of the Republican Party.

== Education ==
Meyers graduated from the University of Michigan–Dearborn in 1979 with a degree in business.

== Career ==
Meyers began his career at Paine Webber. He is now a senior vice president at Raymond James.

Meyers was elected to the Regents of the University of Michigan in 2024 alongside Democrat Denise Iltich. He campaigned on a platform of affordable tuition, protecting first amendment rights, and prohibiting transgender participation in women's sports. He took the seat of Ron Weiser who lost renomination following anti-semitic attacks at the August Republican Party convention. Meyers previously ran for the board unsuccessfully in 2004, 2016 and 2020.
