= Andrew Climie =

American politician

Andrew Climie (February 4, 1834 – May 14, 1897) was an American businessman and politician.

== Life ==
Andrew Climie was born in Whitestone, New York, on February 4, 1834, and educated at Vernon Academy, New York.

He moved to Michigan in 1860 and went into the lumber and milling business in Leonidas.

He served in the Michigan House of Representatives from 1871 to 1875. He was elected to the Board of Regents of the University of Michigan for the term beginning January 1, 1874, but resigned on October 1, 1881, to become superintendent of the university's new library. He died at Pontiac, Michigan, on May 14, 1897. He had a daughter, Mary, who died on April 26, 1892.
