= Michigan Court of Chancery =

Government organization

The Court of Chancery was the court with jurisdiction in cases of equity in the state of Michigan between 1836 and 1847, presided over by a Chancellor. In certain cases, appeal could be made to the Michigan Supreme Court.

The law creating the Court of Chancery took effect July 4, 1836, and it was abolished on March 1, 1847, with its jurisdiction given to the circuit courts. During this time, only two men served as Chancellor. The Chancellor was an ex officio member of the Board of Regents of the University of Michigan.

== List of chancellors of Michigan ==
No.	Image	Name	Term
1		Elon Farnsworth	1836–1842
2		Randolph Manning	1842–1846
3		Elon Farnsworth	1846–1847

== See also ==
- New York Court of Chancery
- Delaware Court of Chancery
