= George Willard =

American politician

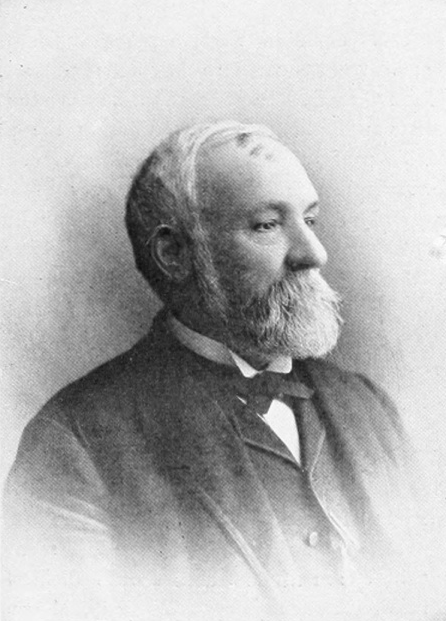

Member of the U.S. House of Representatives from Michigan's 3rd district
- In office March 4, 1873 – March 3, 1877
- Preceded by: Austin Blair
- Succeeded by: Jonas H. McGowan

Member of the Michigan House of Representatives
- In office 1866-1867

Personal details
- Born: March 20, 1824 Bolton, Vermont
- Died: March 26, 1901 (aged 77) Battle Creek, Michigan
- Party: Republican

George Willard (March 20, 1824 – March 26, 1901) was a politician and newspaperman from the U.S. state of Michigan. He served two terms in the U.S. House of Representatives and was also instrumental in opening the University of Michigan to women.

== Biography ==
Willard was born in Bolton, Vermont, where he attended school and received instruction from his father. He moved with his parents to Battle Creek, Michigan, in 1836 and graduated from Kalamazoo College in 1844. He taught school, studied theology, and was ordained a minister of the Episcopal Church in 1848. He served as rector of churches in Coldwater, Battle Creek, and Kalamazoo until 1863. He was a professor of Latin at Kalamazoo College in 1863 and 1864 and engaged in newspaper work in Battle Creek.

He served as a member of the Michigan State Board of Education from 1857 to 1863 and member of the Board of Regents of the University of Michigan from 1863 to 1872. While a regent, he was a strong proponent of the admission of women to the University of Michigan. He introduced an unsuccessful motion to that effect in 1869, but was successful on January 5, 1870, when the Board passed his resolution stating that "the board of regents recognize the right of every resident of Michigan to the enjoyment of the privileges afforded by the university, and that no rule exists in any of the university statutes for the exclusion of any person from the university who possesses the requisite literary and moral qualifications."

Willard was a member of the Michigan State House of Representatives in 1866 and 1867. He was a member of the State constitutional convention in 1867 and a delegate to the Republican National Convention in 1872. He was elected as a Republican from Michigan's 3rd congressional district to the 43rd and 44th United States Congresses, serving from March 4, 1873, to March 3, 1877. He was not a candidate for re-nomination in 1876.

George Willard resumed newspaper work in Battle Creek, serving as editor and owner of the Battle Creek Journal until his death. He was interred in Oak Hill Cemetery.

== Ancestry ==
George Willard was a 4th great-grandson (7th generation descendant) of the Massachusetts colonist Simon Willard (1605–1676).

The American architect, educator, and writer Charles Willard Moore was a descendant of George Willard.

== Notes ==
U.S. House of Representatives
Preceded by Austin Blair	United States Representative for the 3rd congressional district of Michigan; 1873 – 1877	Succeeded by Jonas H. McGowan
