= Sarah Hubbard =

Regent of the University of Michigan

Personal details
- Party: Republican
- Education: University of Michigan, Ann Arbor (BA, MBA); Western Michigan University (MPA)

Sarah Hubbard is a member of the Regents of the University of Michigan first elected in 2020. She is a Republican.

== Education ==
She attended the University of Michigan for her B.A. and M.B.A. and Western Michigan University for her M.P.A.

== Career ==
Hubbard was first elected statewide in 2020 for a term ending in 2029 defeating the Democratic incumbent. She served as chair of the board for the 2023–2024 academic year.
