= Bobby Schostak =

American politician from Michigan

Chair of the Michigan Republican Party
- In office January 2011 – February 2015
- Preceded by: Ronald Weiser
- Succeeded by: Ronna McDaniel

Personal details
- Party: Republican
- Children: 3
- Education: Oakland University
- Profession: Politician

Robert Schostak is a political consultant and former chairman of the Michigan Republican Party, having replaced Ron Weiser.

In 2011, Schostak was first elected Party Chairman for the Michigan Republican Party, and invested heavily in new campaign technologies, including the MI Team Dashboard and a more user-friendly migop.org.

In 2013, Schostak was re-elected as Chairman of the Michigan Republican Party, defeating Tea Party activist Todd Courser.

During the 2014 election cycle, Schostak served as Michigan Republican Party Chairman, raising more than $30 million to support Republican candidates across Michigan. Schostak helped re-elect Governor Snyder, Secretary of State Johnson and Attorney General Schuette. Schostak's vision helped achieve historic Republican majorities in the Michigan State Senate and State House, and helped maintain a conservative majority on the Michigan Supreme Court.

In 2015, Schostak founded the Templar Baker Group.

Schostak attended Hillel Day School. He and his wife Nancy were married in 1978; together they have three children, and four grandchildren.

== Political influence ==
Schostak, along with billionaire Dick DeVos and former MIGOP Chairman Ron Weiser, was one of the primary architects of the so-called right to work legislation that was enacted by the Michigan legislature in a lame duck session in December 2012.
