= Elisha Ely =

American judge & politician

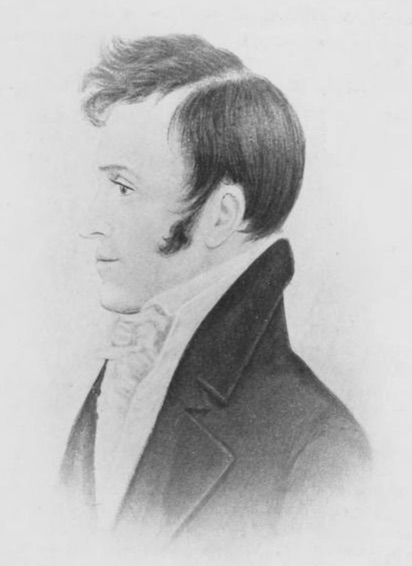

Member of the Michigan House of Representatives from the Allegan County district
- In office November 2, 1835 – December 31, 1837
- Preceded by: Legislature established
- Succeeded by: John R. Kellogg

Personal details
- Born: April 27, 1784 West Springfield, Massachusetts
- Died: November 3, 1854 (aged 70) Allegan, Michigan

Elisha Ely (April 27, 1784 – November 3, 1854) was an American businessman, judge, and politician active in the states of New York and Michigan during the mid-19th century. He was a member of the Michigan House of Representatives in its first year of existence, and was also a regent of the University of Michigan in its first years as a statewide elected body.

== Biography ==
Elisha Ely was born on April 27, 1784, in West Springfield, Massachusetts, the son of John Ely and Abigail Montague.

During the War of 1812, General Peter B. Porter organized a company of dragoons under the command of Major Isaac W. Stone, and Ely was commissioned as a captain. This unit of about fifty men was responsible for repelling, after a brief exchange of cannon fire, the attempted landing by the British admiral Sir James Yeo at Charlotte in May 1814.

Ely formed a company to transport the mail between Canandaigua, and Lewiston, New York, in 1816. He was named the surrogate of Monroe County, New York, on March 10, 1821. The following year he became county clerk following Nathaniel Rochester's election to the state assembly, and served until 1826. He also served as a trustee of Rochester High School following its establishment in 1827.

In 1833 Ely purchased a one-third share of a tract of land in Michigan, on the site of what later became the town of Allegan, and, along with his partners, built a sawmill on the property. His son, Alexander L. Ely, acted as the principal manager. Elisha made a tour of the area that year and returned to Rochester in 1834, before moving to Allegan permanently in 1835.

By 1835, the population of the area was large enough to warrant organization as a separate county rather than a township attached to Kalamazoo County, and at a meeting to organize Allegan County held on August 12, 1835, Ely was elected as a judge of the new county. He was elected as the county's representative to the newly-formed Michigan House of Representatives in the November 5 election that also approved the new state constitution, by a vote of 31 to 30 over Dr. Lintsford B. Coats. The constitution, which had been drafted prior to Allegan County's organization, did not explicitly allocate the seat to which Ely was elected, but since the county was duly organized prior to final approval of the constitution, the House allowed him to take his seat. Ely was appointed superintendent of the poor for Allegan County in 1839; sources do not indicate how long he held the position.

Michigan adopted a new constitution in 1850 that called for the election, rather than appointment, of the Regents of the University of Michigan. Ely was one of the eight men elected in 1851, and served until his death in 1854. During his tenure, the Board of Regents chose the first president of the university, Henry Philip Tappan.

Ely died in Allegan on November 3, 1854.

=== Family ===
Ely married Hannah Dickinson of Hatfield, Massachusetts, on November 11, 1807. They had two children who died young, Mary and Elisha, and seven who survived to adulthood, Alexander Leicester, Elisha Dickinson, Heman Billings, Caroline, John Fellows, George Hervey, and Samuel Partridge. Hannah Ely died of cholera in Rochester on August 30, 1832. Ely remarried in Detroit in April 1837, to Ann Garrison, originally of New York City; she outlived him, dying in Marshall, Michigan, on February 20, 1873.

Michigan House of Representatives
Vacant Legislature established	Member from Allegan County; 1835–1837	Succeeded by John R. Kellogg
