= Sam Walker =

Sam or Sammy Walker may refer to:

- Sam Walker (American football), American football coach
- Sam Walker (rugby league) (born 2002), Australian rugby league player
- Sam Walker (rugby union) (1912–1972), Irish rugby union player
- Sam Walker (golfer) (born 1978), English professional golfer
- Sam Walker (footballer) (born 1991), English professional footballer
- Sam Walker (table tennis) (born 1995), English table tennis player
- Sam Walker (weightlifter) (born 1950), American Olympic weightlifter
- Sam S. Walker (1925–2015), U.S. Army general
- Sam Walker (shot putter) (born 1950), American shot putter, 1971 All-American for the SMU Mustangs track and field team
- a movie character

== See also ==
- Sammy Walker (disambiguation)
- Samuel Walker (disambiguation)
