= 1839 Michigan gubernatorial election =

- November 4–5, 1839
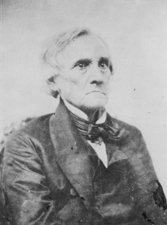

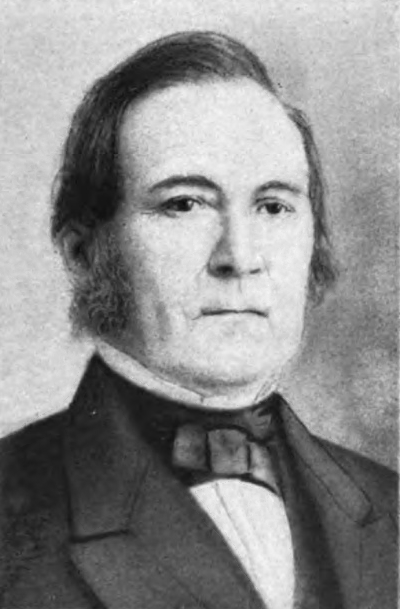
Nominee	William Woodbridge	Elon Farnsworth
Party	Whig	Democratic
Popular vote	18,195	17,037
Percentage	51.56%	48.28%
- County results Woodbridge: 50–60% 60–70% Farnsworth: 50–60% 60–70% No Data/Votes
Governor before election
Stevens T. Mason
Democratic
Elected Governor
William Woodbridge
Whig

The 1839 Michigan gubernatorial election was held from November 4, 1839, to November 5, 1839. Whig nominee William Woodbridge defeated Democratic nominee Elon Farnsworth with 51.56% of the vote.

This was the most recent election in which neither a Republican or Democrat won.

== General election ==
=== Candidates ===
Major party candidates

- William Woodbridge, Whig
- Elon Farnsworth, Democratic

=== Results ===
1839 Michigan gubernatorial election
Party	Candidate	Votes	%	±%
Whig	William Woodbridge	18,195	51.56%	+3.22%
Democratic	Elon Farnsworth	17,037	48.28%	−1.55%
	Scattering	55	0.16%	
Majority		1,158	3.28%	
Total votes		35,287	100.00%	
Whig gain from Democratic		Swing	+4.77%	

==== Results By County ====
No votes were recorded in the following organized counties: Genesee, Livingston, and St. Clair.

County	William Woodbridge Whig		Elon Farnsworth Democratic		Scattering Write-in		Margin		Total votes cast
County	#	%	#	%	#	%	#	%	Total votes cast
Allegan	217	53.45%	189	46.55%	0	0.00%	28	6.90%	406
Barry	113	56.50%	87	43.50%	0	0.00%	26	13.00%	200
Berrien	462	54.23%	389	45.66%	1	0.12%	73	8.57%	852
Branch	382	44.42%	475	55.23%	3	0.35%	-93	-10.81%	860
Calhoun	1,064	50.21%	1,052	49.65%	3	0.14%	12	0.57%	2,119
Cass	503	51.86%	467	48.14%	0	0.00%	36	3.71%	970
Chippewa	22	34.38%	42	65.63%	0	0.00%	-20	-31.25%	64
Clinton	119	46.12%	139	53.88%	0	0.00%	-20	-7.75%	258
Eaton	217	58.65%	153	41.35%	0	0.00%	64	17.30%	370
Hillsdale	667	54.05%	535	43.35%	32	2.59%	132	10.70%	1,234
Houghton	578	47.69%	633	52.23%	1	0.08%	-55	-4.54%	1,212
Ingham	194	50.26%	190	49.22%	2	0.52%	4	1.04%	386
Ionia	195	47.10%	218	52.66%	1	0.24%	-23	-5.56%	414
Jackson	1,331	57.77%	969	42.06%	4	0.17%	362	15.71%	2,304
Kalamazoo	879	57.30%	655	42.70%	0	0.00%	224	14.60%	1,534
Kent	228	44.02%	288	55.60%	2	0.39%	-60	-11.58%	518
Lapeer	396	54.40%	332	45.60%	0	0.00%	64	8.79%	728
Lenawee	1,694	50.76%	1,640	49.15%	3	0.09%	54	1.62%	3,337
Mackinac	41	44.09%	52	55.91%	0	0.00%	-11	-11.83%	93
Macomb	807	50.66%	786	49.34%	0	0.00%	21	1.32%	1,593
Monroe	755	44.67%	933	55.21%	2	0.12%	-178	-10.53%	1,690
Oakland	1,965	51.97%	1,816	48.03%	0	0.00%	149	3.94%	3,781
Ottawa	24	31.17%	53	68.83%	0	0.00%	-29	-37.66%	77
Saginaw	60	41.96%	83	58.04%	0	0.00%	-23	-16.08%	143
Shiawassee	198	60.55%	129	39.45%	0	0.00%	69	21.10%	327
St. Joseph	581	45.07%	708	54.93%	0	0.00%	-127	-9.85%	1,289
Van Buren	153	47.81%	167	52.19%	0	0.00%	-14	-4.38%	320
Washtenaw	2,352	56.15%	1,836	43.83%	1	0.02%	516	12.32%	4,189
Wayne	1,998	49.71%	2,021	50.29%	0	0.00%	-23	-0.57%	4,019
Total	18,195	51.56%	17,037	48.28%	55	0.16%	1,158	3.28%	35,287

===== Counties that flipped from Democratic to Whig =====
- Calhoun
- Hillsdale
- Lenawee
- Oakland

===== Counties that flipped from Whig to Democratic =====
- Saginaw
- Wayne
