= Gurdon C. Leech =

American businessman and politician

Gurdon Clark Leech (February 8, 1811 – May 10, 1841) was an American businessman and politician.

Leech was born in West Bloomfield, New York on February 8, 1811, and went into business in Palmyra, New York, after completing his education. He moved to Utica, Michigan, in 1829 and held various local offices. He was appointed to the Board of Regents of the University of Michigan in March 1838 following the resignation of Michael Hoffman; he served out the remainder of Hoffman's term through 1840. In 1841, he served in the Michigan House of Representatives.

Leech was final President of the Bank of Utica (Michigan); majority shareholder of the Shelby and Detroit Railroad; and was on the main stage during the groundbreaking ceremony of the Clinton–Kalamazoo Canal. He is credited with being the man who suggested the name "Utica" for what had been the prior village of Harlow

He died in Utica, Michigan on May 10, 1841, of Scarlet fever.
