= Sammy Walker =

Sammy Walker may refer to:

- Sammy Walker (American football) (born 1969), American football player
- Sammy Walker (ice hockey) (born 1999), American ice hockey player
- Sammy Walker (singer) (born 1952), American singer-songwriter

== See also ==
- Sam Walker (disambiguation)
- Samuel Walker (disambiguation)
