= Paul Brown (Michigan politician) =

American politician

Regent of the University of Michigan
- Incumbent
- Assumed office January 1, 2019
- Governor: Gretchen Whitmer

Personal details
- Born: 1971 or 1972 (age 54–55)
- Party: Democratic
- Education: University of Michigan (BA, MBA); Wayne State University (JD)

Paul W. Brown (born 1971–1972) is an American lawyer, venture capitalist, and politician serving as a regent of the University of Michigan since 2019. He is a member of the Democratic Party.

== Education ==
He attended the University of Michigan for his B.A. and M.B.A. and Wayne State University for law school.

== Career ==
Brown is a managing partner of eLab Ventures, a Michigan venture capital fund with offices in Silicon Valley.

Brown was first elected statewide to the Regents of the University of Michigan in 2018 for a term ending in 2027 alongside Jordan B. Acker both defeating Republican incumbents. He served as chair of the board for the 2022–2023 academic year, succeeding Acker.
