= Samuel S. Walker =

American businessman and politician (1841–1909)

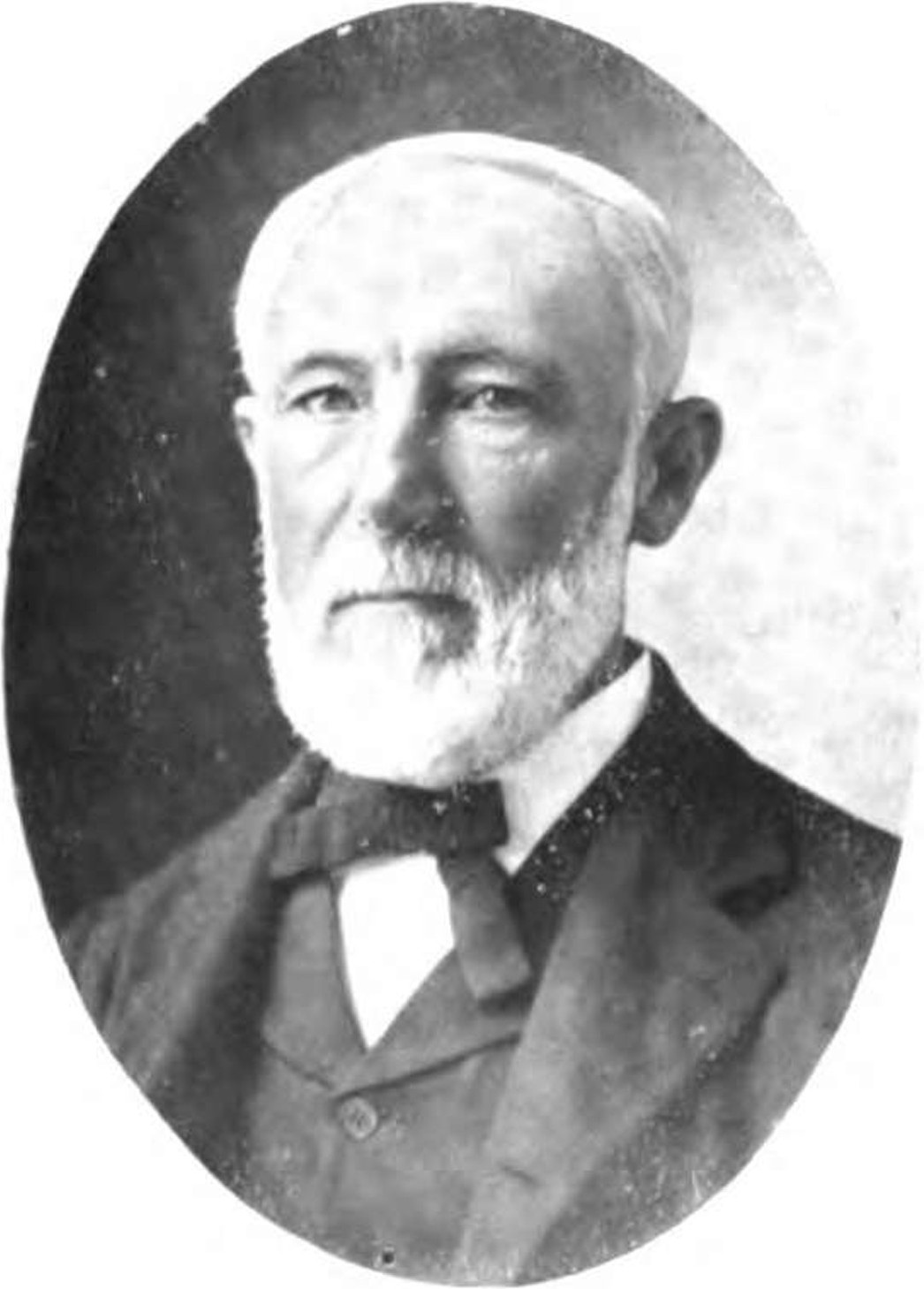
Samuel S. Walker

Samuel Snow Walker (June 11, 1841 – December 9, 1909) was an American businessman and politician. He was a one-term member of the Michigan House of Representatives and a regent of the University of Michigan for eight years.

== Life ==
Walker was born June 11, 1841, in Fredonia, New York, to Alva Walker and Olivia Snow. His father was elected to the New York State Senate in 1853 and served for two years before moving with his family to Detroit in 1855. Samuel Walker attended the Fredonia Academy (now SUNY Fredonia) until the family moved to Detroit, and attended the University of Michigan from 1857 to 1861, graduating with a bachelor of science degree. He married Mary M. Chapin of Ann Arbor, Michigan, on January 14, 1864.

After his graduation from the University of Michigan in June 1861, Walker moved to St. Johns, Michigan where he engaged in various business concerns, and organized the Michigan Mortgage Company in 1888.

He served as a Republican representative from Clinton County in the Michigan House of Representatives from 1875 to 1877, and served on the Board of Regents of the University of Michigan from 1876 until 1884.

Walker retired in 1893 and moved to a fruit farm on the Grand Traverse Peninsula. He died at his home in Old Mission, Michigan, on December 9, 1909.
