= Jordan Acker =

American lawyer, consultant, and politician

Regent of the University of Michigan
- Incumbent
- Assumed office January 1, 2019
- Governor: Gretchen Whitmer

Personal details
- Born: Jordan Benjamin Acker; 1983 or 1984 (age 42–43) Detroit, Michigan, U.S.
- Party: Democratic
- Education: University of Michigan (BA); American University (JD)

Jordan Benjamin Acker (born October 1984) is an American lawyer, consultant, and politician serving as a regent of the University of Michigan since 2019. A member of the Democratic Party, Acker formerly served as an attorney in the Obama administration. He is also an equity partner at Goodman Acker, a personal injury law firm based in Southfield, Michigan, where he practices law and is responsible for the firm's development.

== Early life and education ==
Acker's father, Gerald Acker, is currently the U.S. co-chair of the International Joint Commission.

Acker attended the University of Michigan graduating in 2006. After a stint working in the U.S. Congress as a communications aide to Rep. John Conyers (D-Detroit), he attended law school at American University in Washington, DC, graduating in 2010.

== Career ==
Following law school, Acker was hired as an associate in the Office of Presidential Personnel at the White House during the Obama administration. He was later appointed to serve as an attorney-advisor in the Department of Homeland Security to Secretary Janet Napolitano and Deputy Secretary Jane Lute.

In 2014, he returned to Michigan and began his career at Goodman Acker becoming responsible for business development and expansion while being a practicing lawyer. In 2018, he became a partner at the firm.

=== University of Michigan Board of Regents ===
Jordan ran for the University of Michigan Board of Regents in the 2018 election and was elected statewide with 1.75 million votes becoming the first millennial to serve on the board while winning first place overall and unseating a 24-year Republican incumbent.

Since his election, he has been noted for his "extremely online" approach to university governance and transparency, including through an active account on X. In 2020, he was named to Crain's Detroit Business's "40 under 40" list. Acker became chairman of the Board of Regents on July 3, 2021 for the 2021-2022 academic year. He concluded his term as chairman in June 2022, when the chair rotated to fellow regent Paul W. Brown, garnering praise for his leadership during a tumultuous term.

Acker has participated in discussions around name, image, and likeness (NIL) policies in student athlete compensation. He is a vocal critic of the proposed Big Ten Conference private investment deal.

Acker is a prominent supporter of Israel in the Gaza war, and opposes the Boycott, Divestment and Sanctions movement, a controversial issue which has been the subject of protests at the University of Michigan. In Spring 2024, Acker was part of an effort by the board that brought in Michigan attorney general Dana Nessel to prosecute student protestors when the local prosecutor, like other prosecutors responsible for college campuses in Michigan, declined to bring charge against most student protestors. While on the board, the university authorized an undercover surveillance program against the student protestors. In June 2024, protestors vandalized the offices of Goodman Acker, and in December 2024, Acker's home, with pro-Palestinian and anti-Israel slogans, in incidents condemned as antisemitic and investigated as hate crimes.

While on the board, Acker led the university in ending its diversity, equity, and inclusion practices amid funding threats by the education policy of the second Trump administration. Acker was challenged for reelection by Amir Makled, a left-wing criminal defense lawyer who had represented some of the pro-Palestinian protesters and was backed by the school's graduate student unions, who successfully defeated him in April 2026 at the Michigan Democratic Party's convention.

=== Slack Message Controversy and Investigation ===
In April 2026, The Guardian reported that Acker had sent inappropriate sexual messages about a Democratic strategist in a Slack channel in 2020-21, and separately accused him of inappropriate comments about a student. The report came shortly before Acker lost the re-election nomination to Makled. The university hired law firm Patterson Belknap to investigate, which confirmed the messages' authenticity.

Despite calls for his resignation, Acker said he would finish his term. At a June 2026 board meeting, he apologized without addressing the messages directly, and the university later closed the matter without further action.

== Personal life ==
In 2012, he married Lauren Fell in a ceremony performed inside the Lincoln Park Zoo. The couple were named "Detroiters to Watch" in 2015. They have three daughters.

Acker is known as an avid fan of the University of Michigan's athletic teams.
