= Denise Ilitch =

American businessperson

Member of the University of Michigan Board of Regents
- Incumbent
- Assumed office January 1, 2009
- Governor: Jennifer Granholm; Rick Snyder; Gretchen Whitmer
- Preceded by: Rebecca McGowan

Personal details
- Born: November 1955 (age 70–71) Detroit, Michigan, U.S.
- Party: Democratic
- Spouse: Jim Lites (divorced)
- Parent(s): Marian Ilitch; Mike Ilitch
- Relatives: Christopher Ilitch (brother)
- Education: University of Michigan (BA); University of Detroit (JD)

Denise Ilitch (born November 1955) is an American businessperson, lawyer, and politician serving as a regent of the University of Michigan since 2009. A member of the Democratic Party, she is part of the prominent Ilitch family, and the sister of Christopher Ilitch.

== Background and business experience ==
Denise Ilitch is a third-generation Macedonian American, the daughter of Mike Ilitch and Marian Ilitch, co-founders of Little Caesar Enterprises Inc. She earned her bachelor's degree from the University of Michigan in 1977, and her Juris Doctor from the University of Detroit in 1980. After law school, Ilitch was the vice-president of Little Caesars from 1981 to 1992, during which time the business moved to downtown Detroit from Farmington Hills, sparking other investment in Detroit. She was later president of Ilitch Holdings, a privately held business that manages the Detroit Tigers, Detroit Red Wings, Little Caesars, the Fox Theatre, and other Detroit-area businesses. She is the owner and publisher of Ambassador magazine, and the owner of Denise Ilitch Designs. Ilitch is also "Of Counsel" at the law firm Clark Hill, where she advises clients in the areas of business practice, corporate law, and government policy. In May 2009, she was named as co-chair of Detroit mayor-elect Dave Bing's transition team.

== Community involvement ==
Ilitch serves on the boards of many business and community organizations in the Detroit area. She is a past member of the board of directors for the Detroit Branch NAACP, the ACLU of Michigan advisory committee, the Detroit Metro Convention and Visitors Bureau, and the board of directors of the Detroit Branch of the Federal Reserve Bank of Chicago. Ilitch founded the Ilitch Charities for Children, and established the Denise Ilitch Scholarship at Walsh College for women to complete advanced degrees.

== University of Michigan Board of Regents ==
On November 5, 2008, Ilitch was elected statewide to an eight-year term on the Board of Regents of the University of Michigan. She made controlling university tuition costs a centerpiece of her campaign. Ilitch was one of only two members of the Board of Regents to vote against a tuition hike in July 2009.

She was reelected in 2024, defeating Palestinian American activist Huwaida Arraf who challenged her for the Democratic nomination in August and going on to win the November general election alongside Republican Carl Meyers.

== 2010 gubernatorial election ==
Ilitch was rumored to be a Democratic Party candidate for Governor of Michigan in the 2010 election. After John Cherry withdrew from the race in January 2010, Ilitch met with senior advisors at the White House, including President Barack Obama. Ilitch also met with the Democratic Governors Association while in Washington D.C. She announced the following month that she would not enter the race, citing the compressed campaign schedule.
