= Jonas H. McGowan =

American politician (1837–1909)

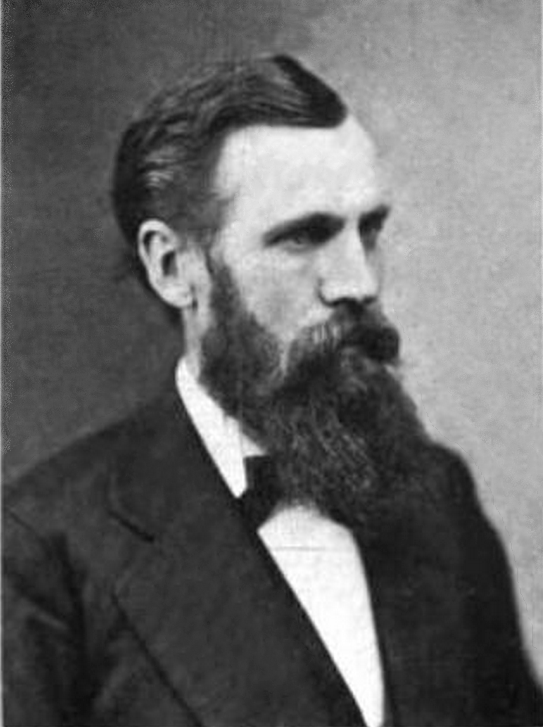
- Jonas Hartzell McGowan

Member of the U.S. House of Representatives from Michigan's 3rd district
- In office March 4, 1877 – March 3, 1881
- Preceded by: George Willard
- Succeeded by: Edward S. Lacey

Personal details
- Born: April 2, 1837 Smith Township, Ohio, U.S.
- Died: July 5, 1909 (aged 72) Washington, D.C., U.S.
- Party: Republican
- Spouse: Josephine Pruden
- Education: University of Michigan
- Military career
- Allegiance: United States
- Branch: Union Army
- Service years: 1862–1864
- Rank: Captain
- Units: Ninth Michigan Cavalry; Fifth Michigan Cavalry
- Conflicts: American Civil War

Jonas Hartzell McGowan (April 2, 1837 – July 5, 1909) was a politician from the U.S. state of Michigan.

== Biography ==
McGowan was born in Smith Township, Ohio (then part of Columbiana County, now Mahoning County). He was the eighth of ten children of Samuel and Susan McGowan. His paternal Scotch-Irish ancestors had fled religious persecution and settled in Pennsylvania. His father was a pioneer in Columbiana County, Ohio, where he cleared a tract of government land and occupied it as a homestead. In 1854, Samuel moved his family to Orland, Indiana, where he died in 1860. McGowan's mother was of German descent and survived the father for another four years. McGowan's father was an abolitionist and his house served as a depot on the Underground Railroad.

McGowan attended Mount Union Seminary in Alliance, Ohio and the Orland Academy. He graduated from the University of Michigan at Ann Arbor with a B.S. degree in 1861 and taught in the city schools of Coldwater, Michigan for one year. In September 1862, he married Josephine Pruden, then preceptress at the High School in Coldwater.

During the Civil War, McGowan served in the Fifth and Ninth Regiments, Michigan Volunteer Cavalry. In August 1862, he enlisted as a private in the Fifth Regiment and was soon promoted to Sergeant of his Company. In November 1862, he was made a captain in the Ninth Regiment, and went into the field early in 1863. Their first service was chasing Confederate General John Hunt Morgan, who made incursions into southern Indiana and Ohio on Morgan's Raid. McGowan took part in the Battle of Salineville, which resulted in the capture of Morgan in July 1863, near Salineville, Ohio. He went into campaigns in East Tennessee with General Ambrose Burnside, until he was forced to resign in 1864 for reasons of poor health.

McGowan returned to Coldwater, where he received an M.S. degree from the University of Michigan in 1865. He studied law, was admitted to the bar in 1867, and commenced practice. McGowan subsequently received an LL.B. degree from the University of Michigan Law School in 1868. He served as prosecuting attorney of Branch County from 1868 to 1872. He was also director of the Coldwater school board for six years. He began serving as a member of the University of Michigan board of regents in 1870 and served until 1877 when he resigned after being elected to Congress. He also represented the 10th district in the Michigan Senate from 1873 to 1874.

In 1876, McGowan was elected as a Republican from Michigan's 3rd congressional district to the 45th United States Congress. He was re-elected to the 46th Congress and served from March 4, 1877, to March 3, 1881. He declined to be a candidate for re-nomination in 1880.

McGowan resumed the practice of his profession in Washington, D.C., until his death there at his home in Cleveland Park on July 5, 1909. He was conferred an honorary LL.D. degree by the University of Michigan in 1901. McGowan was a companion of the District of Columbia commandery of the Military Order of the Loyal Legion of the United States. He was interred in Oak Grove Cemetery, Coldwater, Michigan.

U.S. House of Representatives
Preceded by George Willard	United States Representative for the 3rd congressional district of Michigan; 1877 – 1881	Succeeded by Edward S. Lacey
