= Randolph Manning =

American judge (1804–1864)

Randolph Manning (May 19, 1804 – August 31, 1864) was an American jurist and politician. He served as Michigan Secretary of State (1838-1840) and Chancellor of the Michigan Court of Chancery (1842-1846).

== Biography ==
Born in Plainfield, New Jersey, Manning studied law in New York. In 1832, he moved to Pontiac, Michigan Territory and practiced law.

Manning served as a delegate to the 1835 Michigan state constitutional convention, representing Oakland County.

In 1837, Manning was elected to the Michigan State Senate. He was appointed Michigan Secretary of State in 1838 and served until 1840. Manning was a Democrat until 1854, when he became a Republican because of his opposition to slavery.

Manning served as Chancellor of the Michigan Court of Chancery 1842–1846. He also served on the University of Michigan Board of Regents.

Manning was appointed by the governor to serve on the first Michigan State Board of Education. He served from 1849 to 1850.

In 1858, Manning was appointed to the Michigan Supreme Court serving until his death; he died in Pontiac, Michigan.

== Notes ==
Political offices
Preceded by Kintzing Pritchette	Secretary of State of Michigan; 1838–1840	Succeeded by Thomas Rowland
