= List of presidents of the American Medical Association =

Following is a list of presidents of the American Medical Association, founded in 1847:

- Nathaniel Chapman, 1847–48
- Alexander Hodgdon Stevens, 1848–49
- John Collins Warren, 1849–50
- Reuben D. Mussey, 1850–51
- James Moultrie, 1851–52
- Beverly R. Wellford, 1852–53
- Jonathan Knight, 1853–54
- Charles A. Pope, 1854–55
- George Bacon Wood, 1855–56
- Zina Pitcher, 1856–57
- Paul F. Eve, 1857–58
- Harvey Lindsly, 1858–59
- Henry Miller, 1859–60
- Eli Ives, 1860–61
- Alden March, 1863–64
- Nathan Smith Davis, 1864–66
- David Humphreys Storer, 1866–67
- Henry F. Askew, 1867–68
- Samuel D. Gross, 1868–69
- William O. Baldwin, 1869–70
- George Mendenhall, 1870–71
- Alfred Stillé, 1871–72
- D. W. Yandell, 1872–73
- Thomas M. Logan, 1873–74
- Joseph M. Toner, 1874–75
- W. K. Bowling, 1875–76
- J. Marion Sims, 1876–77
- Henry I. Bowditch, 1877–78
- T. G. Richardson, 1878–79
- Theophilus Parvin, 1879–80
- Lewis Sayre, 1880–81
- John T. Hodgen, 1881–82
- Joseph Janvier Woodward, 1882–83
- John Light Atlee, 1883–84
- Austin Flint I, 1884–85
- H. F. Campbell, 1885–86
- William Brodie, 1886–87
- E. H. Gregory, 1887–88
- Y. P. Garnett, 1888–89
- W. W. Dawson, 1889–80
- E. M. Moore, 1890–91
- W. T. Briggs, 1891–92
- H. O. Marcy, 1892–93
- Hunter McGuire, 1893–94
- James F. Hibberd, 1894–95
- Donald MacLean, 1885–96
- R. Beverly Cole, 1896–97
- Nicholas Senn, 1897–98
- George Miller Sternberg, 1898–99
- J. M. Mathews, 1899–1900
- W. W. Keen, 1900–01
- C. A. L. Reed, 1901–02
- John Allan Wyeth, 1902–03
- Frank Billings, 1903–04
- John Herr Musser, 1904–05
- L. S. McMurtry, 1905–06
- William James Mayo, 1906–07
- Joseph D. Bryant, 1907–08
- Herbert Leslie Burrell, 1908–09
- William C. Gorgas, 1909–10
- William H. Welch, 1910–11
- John Benjamin Murphy, 1911–12
- Abraham Jacobi, 1912–13
- John A. Witherspoon, 1913–14
- Victor C. Vaughan, 1914–15
- William L. Rodman, 1915
- Albert Vander Veer (vice president), 1915–16
- Rupert Blue, 1916–17
- Charles Horace Mayo, 1917–18
- Arthur D. Bevan, 1918–19
- Alexander Lambert, 1919–20
- William Clarence Braisted, 1920–21
- Hubert Work, 1921–22
- George de Schweinitz, 1922–23
- Ray Lyman Wilbur, 1923–24
- William Allen Pusey, 1924–25
- William D. Haggard, 1925–26
- Wendell C. Phillips, 1926–27
- Jabez N. Jackson, 1927–28
- William W. Thayer, 1928–29
- Malcolm L. Harris, 1929–30
- William Gerry Morgan, 1930–31
- E. Starr Judd, 1931–32
- Edward H. Cary, 1932–33
- Dean D. Lewis, 1933–34
- Walter L. Bierring, 1934–35
- James S. McLester, 1935–36
- James Tate Mason, 1936
- Charles Gordon Heyd, 1936–37
- J. H. J. Upham, 1937–38
- Irvin Abell, 1938–39
- Rock Sleyster, 1939–40
- Nathan B. Van Etten, 1940–41
- Frank H. Lahey, 1941–42
- Fred W. Rankin, 1942–43
- James E. Paullin, 1943–44
- Herman L. Kretschmer, 1944–45
- Roger I. Lee, 1945–46
- H. H. Shoulders, 1946–47
- Edward L. Bortz, 1947–48
- Roscoe L. Sensenich, 1948–49
- Ernest E. Irons, 1949–50
- Elmer L. Henderson, 1950–51
- John W. Cline, 1951–52
- Louis H. Bauer, 1952–53
- Edward J. McCormick, 1953–54
- Walter B. Martin, 1954–55
- Elmer Hess, 1955–56
- Dwight H. Murray, 1956–57
- David B. Allman, 1957–58
- Gunnar Gundersen, 1958–59
- Louis M. Orr, 1959–60
- E. Vincent Askey, 1960–61
- Leonard W. Larson, 1961–62
- George M. Fister, 1962–63
- Edward R. Annis, 1963–64
- Norman A. Welch, 1964
- Donovan F. Ward (vice president), 1964–65
- James Z. Appel, 1965–66
- Charles L. Hudson, 1966–67
- Milford O. Rouse, 1967–68
- Dwight Locke Wilbur, 1968–69
- Gerald D. Dorman, 1969–70
- W. C Bornemeier, 1970–71
- Wesley W. Hall, 1971–72
- C. A. Hoffman, 1972–72
- Russell B. Roth, 1973–74
- Malcolm C. Todd, 1974–75
- Max H. Parrott, 1975–76
- Richard E. Palmer, 1976–77
- John H. Budd, 1977–78
- Thomas E. Nesbitt, 1978–79
- Hoyt D. Gardner, 1979–80
- Robert B. Hunter, 1980–81
- Daniel T. Cloud, 1981–82
- William Y. Rial, 1982–83
- Frank J. Jirka Jr., 1983–84
- Joseph F. Boyle, 1984–85
- Harrison L. Rogers, Jr., 1985–86
- John J. Coury, Jr., 1986–87
- William S. Hotchkiss, 1987–88
- James E. Davis, 1988–89
- Alan R. Nelson, 1989–90
- C. John Tupper, 1990–91
- John J. Ring, 1991–92
- John L. Clowe, 1992–93
- Joseph T. Painter, 1993–94
- Robert E. McAfee, 1994–95
- Lonnie R. Bristow, 1995–96
- Daniel H. Johnson, Jr., 1996–97
- Percy Wootton, 1997–98
- Nancy Dickey, 1998–99
- Thomas Reardon, 1999–2000
- Randolph D. Smoak, Jr., 2000–01
- Richard F. Corlin, 2001–02
- Yank D. Coble, Jr., 2002–03
- Donald J. Palmisano, 2003–04
- John C. Nelson, 2004–05
- J. Edward Hill, 2005–06
- William G. Plested, III, 2006–07
- Ronald M. Davis, 2007–08
- Nancy H. Nielsen, 2008–09
- J. James Rohack, 2009–10
- Cecil B. Wilson, 2010–11
- Peter W. Carmel, 2011–12
- Jeremy A. Lazarus, 2012–13
- Ardis Dee Hoven, 2013–14
- Robert M. Wah, 2014–15
- Steven J. Stack, 2015–16
- Andrew W. Gurman, 2016–17
- David O. Barbe, 2017–18
- Barbara L. McAneny, 2018–2019
- Patrice Harris, 2019–2020
- Susan R. Bailey, 2020–2021
- Gerald E. Harmon, 2021–2022
- Jack Resneck, Jr., 2022–2023
- Jesse M. Ehrenfeld, 2023–2024
- Bruce A. Scott, 2024–2025
- Bobby Mukkamala, 2025–2026
- Willie Underwood III, 2026-2027
