= Whitaker and Baxter =

American political consulting organization

Clem Whitaker and Leone Baxter were a husband-and-wife team that started Campaigns, Inc., the first political consulting firm in the United States. Based in California, the firm worked on a variety of political issues, mostly for Republican Party candidates. They both supported conservative ideals.

During the 1934 California gubernatorial election, they engineered a smear campaign against socialist Upton Sinclair in an effort to prevent him from unseating incumbent Republican Frank Merriam. They were successful, and Sinclair ultimately lost.

The couple developed strategies and tactics - such as media advertisement buys and direct-mail campaigns - that are still widely used in today's campaigns. Their public relations work not only revolutionized politics in the modern era, but also deeply impacted political issues that remain relevant today.

== Backgrounds ==
=== Clem Whitaker ===
Clement Sherman Whitaker was born in Tempe, Arizona, on May 1, 1899, the son of a Baptist minister. He was raised in Willits, California, where he submitted his first news story, for the Willits News, at age 13. He began working for the Sacramento Union at age 18.

Following a brief stint in the Army during World War I, Whitaker became city editor for the Union before moving to the Sacramento Examiner at age 21. He was a political writer for the Examiner until 1921, when he founded the Capitol News Bureau. His company disseminated political news to eighty newspapers statewide. While living in Sacramento, he married Harriet Reynolds. The couple had four children: Clem Jr., Milton, Patricia and Burdett.

=== Leone Baxter ===
Leone Baxter was born Leone J. Smith in Kelso, Washington, on November 20, 1906, the third child of Leon W. and Grace Pearl (Hayes) Smith. According to the 1910 U.S. Federal Census, her father was a farmer from Wisconsin. Her mother's family was from New York. Leone briefly wrote for the Portland Oregonian.

In June 1925, Leone was issued a marriage license for herself and Alex D. Baxter in Tacoma. She worked as a secretary for the Chamber of Commerce in Redding, California. There she promoted a water carnival for the Chamber of Commerce. She became the Chamber manager in 1929.

Around 1929 she and her husband moved to Sacramento. Leone Baxter accepted the position of office manager of the State Water Plan Association in Sacramento in October 1933.

Alex D. Baxter tragically lost his life in a car accident on December 14, 1933, on Hoopa Road near Willow Creek, California. He had just visited Leone in Sacramento and was on his way back to work in Humboldt County when his vehicle veered off the road and fell 100 feet to the riverbed below.

Leone Baxter and Clem Whitaker were issued a marriage license on April 11, 1938, while both of them lived in San Francisco. They made their first home in Oakland California.

Leone (Smith) Baxter-Whitaker died on March 13, 2001.

== Origin of the firm ==
=== Lobbying ===
After selling his business to United Press in 1930, a barber friend whose trade association was having trouble lobbying the state legislature caught Whitaker's attention. For $4,000, Whitaker organized the barbers into a potent lobbying group, leading to legislation creating the State Board of Barber Examiners.

In 1933, the Pacific Gas and Electric Company (PG&E) lobbied to place Proposition 1 on the ballot for California's December 1933 special election. This measure was aimed at striking down recent legislation that would establish the Central Valley Project (CVP). The CVP was to be the nation's largest water irrigation project, supported by the progressivists who believed in non-privatized power. While PG&E wanted to pass Proposition 1 to defeat the CVP, lawyer Sheridan Downey was forming a team to help defeat Proposition 1.

=== Campaigns, Inc. ===
Whitaker's lobbying efforts for the barbers' trade union attracted Downey, who hired him to help on the campaign. Knowing that Redding would also have economic interests in protecting the Central Valley Project, Downey recruited Baxter, the city's Chamber of Commerce manager, to help with his undertaking. Downey paired Whitaker and Baxter together on the project. Whitaker and Baxter's efforts helped defeat the measure by 33,000 votes.

This partnership led to the formation of their campaign management firm, Campaigns, Inc., in 1933. In 1935, Whitaker separated from his then wife, Harriet Reynolds. In 1938, after being in business together for five years, Whitaker and Baxter married. Their business, called Campaigns Inc., was not formally incorporated until 1950, under the name Whitaker & Baxter, Inc. The business became known as the first public relations firm in the country dedicated solely to politics.

Over the next 25 years, the firm handled over 75 campaigns and initiatives, spanning topics such as taxation and finance, pensions, and legislative reapportionment, as well as teacher's salaries and railroad crew issues. Clients who utilized Campaigns, Inc. were also entitled to many of the other enterprises that Whitaker and Baxter pursued, including the Clem Whitaker Advertising Agency, Whitaker-Baxter Public Relations, and an editorial and news syndicate that sent prepared materials to publishers throughout California.

Whitaker and Baxter eventually named Whitaker's son, Clem, Jr. and James J. Dorais as junior partners in the firm. These four formed the core staff, along with several other staff members. In 1959, when Clem, Sr.'s health began to plague him in 1959, Whitaker and Baxter sold the firm to Clem, Jr., James Dorais, and Newton Stearns. The two original founders then formed Whitaker and Baxter International, after which Whitaker died in 1961 and from which Baxter retired in the early 1980s. Clem, Jr. wrote in a letter on October 31, 1991, "Years ago when I assumed management of Whitaker and Baxter we phased out of the campaign management business. Our last candidate campaign was the election of Senator Robert Griffin over Governor Mennen "Soapy" Williams in Michigan in 1966. We ceased ballot issue campaigns in 1973." Whitaker and Baxter remained a consulting firm in the area of public affairs representing energy clients, maintaining offices in San Francisco and Washington, D.C. as a public affairs lobbying group.

== Career highlights ==
=== George Hatfield for lieutenant governor ===
Campaigns Inc. was retained for their first official political campaign in 1934. George Hatfield, a prominent Republican who served as U.S. Attorney for California's Northern District, was running for Lieutenant Governor of California against Democrat Sheridan Downey, who had first introduced the pair of political consultants. For Hatfield's election, Whitaker & Baxter's company records from this campaign included speeches and advertisements they produced. They also analyzed polling data to determine if their message was affecting voters. Ultimately, Hatfield would go on to win the election.

=== Frank Merriam for Governor ===
In 1934, Whitaker & Baxter were hired by the client who would ultimately put them on the map. Frank Merriam, California's former lieutenant governor who had been volleyed to the gubernatorial seat following the mid-term death of James Rolph, was running for re-election as governor. Merriam, who assumed the governor's office in June 1934, had immediately faced a union crisis. The International Longshoremen's Association was striking, effectively shutting down the ports in San Francisco. When police attempted to escort temporary workers to the docks, they became engaged in skirmishes with the strikers. Fearing political ruin if he sent the Guard in to subdue the strikers, Merriam is rumored to have worked a deal with state Republicans to the party's gubernatorial nominee in exchange for the deployment. Ultimately, both federal and state troops were able to handle the situation, and Merriam was able to blame the ordeal on the political Left.

Merriam's main opponent in the gubernatorial election would be Upton Sinclair, author of The Jungle. A known Socialist, Sinclair had been able to win a surprise victory in the primary due to his EPIC Project, which stood for "End Poverty in California." The EPIC plan included government work programs and cooperatives. When Whitaker and Baxter were hired, they were told explicitly their main responsibility was, "Keep [Sinclair] from becoming Governor". This agenda is especially significant because the subsequent, direct-offensive strategy employed by Campaigns, Inc. was unheard of at the time. In their first major election, Whitaker and Baxter were able to lead Merriam to a victory over Sinclair, 48% to 37%, with a third-party candidate taking 13%. Arthur Schlesinger called this the first all out public relations Blitzkrieg in American Politics, while Sidney Blumenthal considered it a landmark in the development of the political consultant. For the time, their work was groundbreaking. However, the tactics they used to attack Sinclair are still a widely used campaign strategy today.

==== Strategies against Sinclair ====
Prior to the election, Sinclair was a renowned writer. I, Governor of California, and How I Ended Poverty was a work of Sinclair's set in the future. The basic scenario of the book was that Sinclair had been elected governor, and his EPIC plan had succeeded in one-hundred percent employment for California. However, his other writings did not help him achieve these lofty goals. Using oppositional research tactics, Whitaker and Baxter pored through all of Sinclair's writings, finding quotes that they could use against him. The Los Angeles Times began putting quotes from Sinclair on their front page six weeks before the election. Sinclair ultimately attributed his loss to Whitaker & Baxter, who were named only as "The Lie Factory" in his post-election book, "I, Candidate for Governor, and How I Got Licked."

For their part, Whitaker and Baxter's oppositional research was not entirely factual. The following quote, which appeared on the Los Angeles Times reflecting Sinclair's opinion on marriage, was taken from dialogue spoken by a fictional character in Sinclair's 1911 novel Love's Pilgrimage:

The sanctity of marriage. ... I have had such a belief ... I have it no longer."

"Sure, those quotations were irrelevant," Baxter later explained, “But we had one objective: to keep him from becoming Governor.” They believed that any quotes which could be attributed to Upton, and therefore his campaign, were fair to use against him. Whitaker later said he believed "Upton was beaten because he had written books".

===== California League Against Sinclairism =====
Aside from oppositional research, Whitaker and Baxter used a variety of other tactics against Sinclair. They decided to organize a bipartisan front group known as the California League Against Sinclairism. Whitaker and Baxter used this group to disseminate information regarding Sinclair's "socialist agenda."

===== Media =====
Additionally, media was a key part of the Whitaker and Baxter campaign strategy. They believed in the extensive scripting of candidates to keep them on message in the media, rather than allowing ragtag bands of volunteers to handle branding their candidate. They pursued earned media, meaning that they encourage candidates like Merriam to create news rather than simply sending in press releases. The team would go so far as to trade paid advertising for editorial space. However, if news could not be legitimately created, Whitaker and Baxter believed in creating the perception of news. Whitaker and Baxter teamed up with media tycoon Louis B. Mayer to promote Frank Merriam in an advertisement. The ad was meant to look like the newsreels of the day, although the true purpose is to create the perception that people who support Sinclar are pro-Communism and Socialism. Whitaker and Baxter considered this type of advertisement to be effective as it was often perceived as earned media.

=== Healthcare reform ===
During his New Deal era, Franklin Roosevelt called for major healthcare reform in the form of government-subsidized medicine. In 1945, President Harry Truman took up this fight, calling on Congress to overhaul the country's healthcare system. The American Medical Association began to lobby against the president's proposal. In 1949, they retained Whitaker & Baxter to help them with their efforts. The AMA paid Whitaker & Baxter $350,000 to defeat Truman's healthcare plan. In their usual style, Whitaker & Baxter began an all out media war against the healthcare plan, distributing over 100 million pieces of literature. In just two weeks of the campaign, Whitaker & Baxter was given a $100,000 retainer and over $1 million to spend on advertising, which is a $1.4 million retainer and $14 million budget in today's dollars. They spent $1.1 million in advertising on behalf of the AMA. As part of their messaging, they began calling the president's healthcare plan "socialized medicine," ushering in the same negative connotations and allusions to communism that they had brought upon Sinclair.

==== Branding reform ====
President Truman was quick to defend his plan. The plan included federal funding to attract doctors to rural areas, give funding to rural areas to build new hospitals, federal standards for hospitals and health centers to be implemented by a board of doctors and public officials, and the creation of a national health insurance fund to be managed by the federal government. Unfortunately for Truman, the term "socialized medicine" stuck. In 1961, Ronald Reagan would continue using the phrase in his LP Ronald Reagan Speaks Out Against Socialized Medicine, released on behalf of the AMA. The term would fuel the so-called Operation Coffee Cup of the 1960s, in which doctors' wives would invite friends over and speak to them about the evils of "socialized medicine," after which they would encourage them to write to their congressmen about the issue.

Ultimately, it would take the American Medical Association over 3 years and $5 million, which would equate to nearly $40 million by today's standards. After the onset of the Korean War, Congress and the president no longer had time to fight lobbying efforts against the measure, resulting in the legislation failing to pass.

=== End of the firm ===
In the late 1950s, Whitaker and Baxter had a falling out with then-client Governor Goodwin Knight. While Knight had hired the duo for several of his earlier campaigns, he did not bring them back on for his run for the Senate in 1958. Because of this and Whitaker's failing health, the company began to fade from the political scene. Later in 1958, Whitaker and Baxter sold their company to Clem Whitaker Jr., who would later redirect the focus of their business operations into corporate public relations. The duo formed Whitaker and Baxter International, a smaller public relations consulting firm, which they would run from a San Francisco hotel room. In 1961, Whitaker died of emphysema. Baxter continued running Whitaker and Baxter International after her husband's death. In 2001, she died in Sacramento at the age of 96.

== Notable clients ==
According to the inventory of Whitaker and Baxter Campaigns, Inc., the duo provided public relations, advertising, and/or other consulting work for these electoral campaigns:

- George Hatfield for Lieutenant Governor
- Fred Stewart for Board of Equalization
- George Hatfield for Governor
- Walter Scott Franklin for Lieutenant Governor
- Wendell Willkie-Charles McNary (Presidential Campaign)
- William Menzel for State Senate
- Earl Warren for Governor
- George Reilly for Mayor of San Francisco
- Justus Craemer for U.S. Senate
- Dewey-Bricker Taskforce (Presidential Campaign)
- Earl Lee Kelly for Governor
- Hartley Peart for U.S. Senate
- Goodwin Knight for Lieutenant Governor
- Elmer Robinson for Mayor of San Francisco
- Re-elect Elmer Robinson for Mayor of San Francisco
- Goodwin Knight for Governor
- Governor Goodwin Knight for U.S. Senate (Primary)
- A. Ronald Button for State Treasurer
- Richard M. Nixon for President
- Thomas O'Connor for City Attorney
- George Christopher for Lieutenant Governor
- Judge Tom Coakley for Attorney General
- Ben Dillingham for U.S. Senate
- Harold Dobbs for Mayor of San Francisco
- Shirley Temple Black for Congress

In addition, Whitaker and Baxter records show that the worked on 45 unique local ballot options.

== Strategy ==
=== Inner workings of Campaigns, Inc. ===
Generally, Whitaker and Baxter worked on political and policy questions, though they also aided firms with corporate public relations, such as improving the image of cottonseed oil or imitation ice cream. Their political clientele was mostly Republicans of the 1940s and 1950s, including Governor Earl Warren, Governor Goodwin Knight, and Dwight Eisenhower's California Presidential campaign. Though Whitaker and Baxter ostensibly helped all those who approached their firm, in practice they were committed to small-government conservatism and forestalling or rolling back the New Deal. One of their most influential campaigns was helping the American Medical Association fight off the national health insurance plans of Franklin Roosevelt and Harry Truman. Though unmentioned in the film, much of the archival anti-national health care propaganda seen in Michael Moore's Sicko, including Ronald Reagan's phonograph speech on how national health care is the first step towards socialism, was produced in 1949 under the direction of Whitaker and Baxter.

Whitaker and Baxter directed and framed messages to the public in a completely new way. They understood the average American voter to be most receptive to simple, repetitive, and easy-to-read messages. They simplified issues relevant to the campaign at hand and disseminated their message through mass media outlets. One of their main principles was, "Never explain anything", because the more details provided to the public make support far more difficult to receive.

=== Precepts ===
Whitaker and Baxter developed several precepts to justify their tactics with Campaigns, Inc. They included adages such as:

1. "Never wage a campaign defensively! The only successful defense is a spectacular, hard-hitting, crushing offensive. You can't wage a defensive campaign and win."
2. "Attempt to create actual news instead of merely sending out publicity."
3. "More Americans like corn than caviar."
4. "The average American doesn't want to be educated; he doesn't want to improve his mind; he doesn't even want to work, consciously, at being a good citizen. [But] most every American likes to be entertained. He likes the movies; he likes the mysteries; he likes the fireworks and parades…so if you can't fight, put on a show!"
5. "The more you have to explain, the more difficult it is to win support."

=== Tactics ===
Unlike the parties of the day, Whitaker and Baxter could and insisted on emphasizing pace, control, and rhythm in a campaign.They did not trust enthusiastic local volunteers to run an effective campaign, and thus made judgments for themselves on how to allocate resources, relying also on their employed Field Men to check up on district offices.

They were not above dirty tricks, as seen in their work for the 1934 re-election campaign of Governor Frank Merriam in his push to defeat social reformer Upton Sinclair. The major thrust of their work was a smear campaign against Sinclair, alleging in newspaper stories that he seduced young girls, and placing film reels that depicted Sinclair's supporters as socialist pro-Soviets.

==== Fundraising ====
Whitaker and Baxter also specialized in fundraising, and maintained a massive web of operations throughout California, representing a range of industries, ethnic groups, and special interests. They developed early models of campaign finance and expenditure, including spending money early to drive out challengers (as in Goodwin Knight's 1954 gubernatorial campaign) or holding as much as 75% of their total funds to the end of the campaign (typically, the last three weeks), when voters were paying attention.

==== California Features Service ====
In addition to the core of Campaigns Inc., Whitaker and Baxter had two side businesses which helped them satisfy their client's needs. Clem Whitaker Advertising Agency was the advertising arm of Campaigns Inc. With this, Whitaker would plan and design all advertising efforts for his clients in accordance with the campaign strategy he developed with Campaigns Inc. The California Feature Service was a newspaper wire service which delivered articles and editorials to about 300 local newspapers in California. Whitaker and Baxter would create these releases to mimic editorial copy. Editors looking for quick content to fill their papers often would not notice that the copy was from an advertising service.

== Contributions to public relations ==
Whitaker and Baxter made lasting contributions to the field of public relations. Firstly, they developed the political consulting into what we know it today. They are responsible for professionalizing political public relations by developing the first organization whose purpose was solely political campaigning. Campaigns, Inc. was formed in 1930, after the landscape of the political marketing industry as a whole was experiencing changes and developments throughout the 1920s. These changes came from the overall development of commercial mass marketing in the beginning of the century. Whitaker and Baxter dominated the field for years without competition, and have a track record of winning seventy out of seventy five campaigns between 1933 and 1955.

Campaigns Inc. is responsible for shaping macro-level features of political public relations that remain relevant today. They were the first organization to comprehensively be in control of all aspects of a campaign for both individuals and for larger organizations "interested in constitutional amendments or other issues". This was significant not only in what it meant for the world of PR and political campaigning, but further what it meant for the political landscape of the United States as a whole. In 1936, V.O. Key analyzed the changes made by Campaigns Inc. and understood it to be a change from "personal politics of the precinct variety toward a reliance on mass propaganda techniques".

More specifically, they revolutionized the PR media tactics of the day, putting a heavy emphasis on television and radio advertising rather than simple word of mouth or grassroots efforts. Additionally, they relied heavily on direct mail campaigns, which are still popular to this day, in a way no other organization had thought to so before. In doing this, Whitaker and Baxter ensured the full service campaign management became the norm for political campaigns, from presidential campaigns all the way down to state house and more local races.

Money and advertising, which were not considered essential before Campaigns Inc., are still thought of as major aspects of today's campaigns. Where the political bosses of the day used throw their weight with bribes or incentives to attract voters, political consultants are able to carefully craft a message that both attracts voters and makes careful use of a candidate's budget. Because of their expertise, political consultants have now become the norm for campaigns, and the quality of a political consultant can make or break even a well-qualified candidate. In this way, political consultants replaced party bosses as the power holders in politics. This idea is still seen very much in today's political landscape.

Campaigns, Inc. and the work of Whitaker and Baxter is not without criticism. The "excessive professionalization" of the campaign industry is thought by some to be harmful to the democratic process, especially after their work for the AMA with "socialized medicine". The idea of ethics in public relations became extremely important, and is still debated and questioned in today's world. Whitaker and Baxter showed for the first time the magnitude of power that strategic political communication can have over public opinion.

The legacy of Whitaker and Baxter has affected the political issues that we still consider salient. Healthcare reform today is still largely framed using the terminology introduced by Whitaker and Baxter. This political team was able to use effective advertising and messaging to not only halt the progress of healthcare reform for their client, but to hasten this process so much that it is still being debated today.

Theodore White, the famous American journalist and novelist, made the following remarks about the legacy of Whitaker and Baxter:

Clem Whitaker and Leone Baxter are now gone, but their kind of politics, professional image-making, has not only persisted, but thrived; and, in thriving, swept East, where politics industry has grown up—a gathering of professionals who merchandise control of voter reactions.

== In popular culture ==
Whitaker and Baxter, and their work on the 1934 election involving Upton Sinclair, is the basis for the play "Campaigns, Inc." by Will Allan, which premiered at TimeLine Theatre Company in Chicago, Illinois on August 11, 2022. The play is a 1930s screwball comedy revolving around the Campaigns, Inc. team and the smear tactics they developed to take down Sinclair's campaign. The play was both a critical and financial success. It closed on September 25, 2022.
