= Percy Wootton =

American cardiologist

152nd President of the American Medical Association
- In office 1997–1998
- Preceded by: Daniel H. Johnson, Jr.
- Succeeded by: Nancy Dickey

American Medical Association Board of Trustees
- In office 1991–1996

Lynchburg College Board of Trustees

Personal details
- Education: Lynchburg College (B.S. 1953; DSc 1998); Medical College of Virginia (M.D. 1957)
- Profession: Cardiologist; Clinical Professor of Medicine (MCV)

Percy Wootton is an American cardiologist. In June 1997, he became president of the American Medical Association, after having served as a member of the Board of Trustees from 1991 to 1996. Wootton was a clinical professor of medicine at the Medical College of Virginia, Virginia Commonwealth University.

== Education ==
Wootton earned his Bachelor of Science degree from Lynchburg College in 1953.

He earned his medical degree from the Medical College of Virginia, Virginia Commonwealth University in 1957. In medical school, he was a member of the Alpha Omega Alpha Honor Medical Society. Dr. Wootton returned to Lynchburg College to pursue a Doctorate of Sciences, which he earned in 1998.

== Offices held ==
- President, American Medical Association 1997-1998
- Board of Trustees Member, American Medical Association 1991-1996
- Board of Trustees Member, Lynchburg College
- President, Richmond Academy of Medicine
- President, Medical Society of Virginia
- President, The Richmond Area Heart Association
- President, The Virginia Heart Association

== Awards & honors ==
- Outstanding Alumnus Award, Medical College of Virginia, 1996
- Fellow, American College of Physicians
- Fellow, American College of Cardiology

== See also ==
- List of presidents of the American Medical Association
