= Zina Pitcher =

American physician and politician

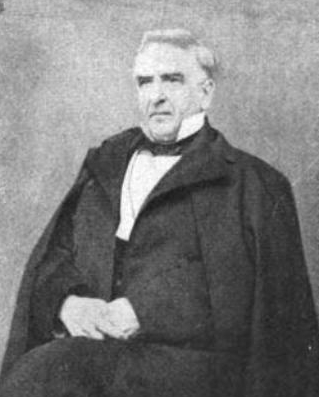

16th & 18th Mayor of Detroit
- In office 1843–1843
- Preceded by: Douglass Houghton
- Succeeded by: John R. Williams
- In office 1840–1841
- Preceded by: De Garmo Jones
- Succeeded by: Douglass Houghton

Personal details
- Born: April 12, 1797 Sandy Hill, New York
- Died: April 5, 1872 (aged 74) Detroit, Michigan
- Education: Middlebury College
- Profession: Physician

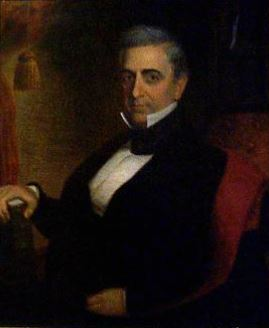
Portrait of Pitcher from 1852, by Alvah Bradish

Zina Pitcher (April 12, 1797, in Sandy Hill, New York – April 5, 1872, in Detroit) was an American physician, politician, educator, and academic administrator. He was a president of the American Medical Association, a two-time mayor of Detroit and a member of the Board of Regents of the University of Michigan.

== Biography ==
=== Early life ===
Pitcher was born in Sandy Hill, New York, on April 12, 1797. He was the son of Nathaniel Pitcher Sr., who died in Sandy Hill in 1802, and Margaret Stevenson, who died in Kingsbury, in 1819. He was the younger half-brother of Nathaniel Pitcher, a future Governor of New York. (In his 1836 will, Nathaniel mentioned an Osage orange walking stick given to him by Zina.) Another of Zina's brothers was James Pitcher, who became the first mayor of the city of Little Rock, Arkansas, in 1835. Zina attended Middlebury College in Vermont and graduated in medicine in 1822.

=== Career ===
Pitcher joined the Army in 1822 as an assistant surgeon, and was promoted to the rank of major in 1836 as a full surgeon. He was president of the Army Medical Board in 1835, and resigned from the Army at the end of 1836.

Pitcher was also an excellent botanist (not uncommon for medical professionals of his day). He collected and studied plants in the Great Lakes region, and the exceedingly rare Pitcher's thistle (Cirsium pitcheri) was first collected by him from the Grand Sable Dunes during his service as an Army surgeon; subsequently it was named for him as well. At times Pitcher teamed with botanist Thomas Nuttall.

He moved to Detroit, and was elected mayor for two separate terms, once from 1840–1841 and again in 1843. He was also a regent of the University of Michigan from 1837 until 1852 where he bought a copy of Audubon's "Birds of America" for the library. He served as president of the American Medical Association from 1856 to 1857, presiding over its annual meeting in Detroit.

He died in Detroit on April 5, 1872, and is buried in Elmwood Cemetery.

== Commemoration ==
- The Zina Pitcher Collegiate Professorship of the History of Medicine at the University of Michigan Medical School
- Zina Pitcher Place, a street leading into the University of Michigan Medical Center
- The Great Lakes endemic plant, Pitcher's thistle, named for its discoverer.
- Dr. Zina Pitcher Elementary School (closed 2007, demolished 2019)

== Notes ==
Political offices
Preceded by De Garmo Jones	Mayor of Detroit; 1840–1841	Succeeded by Douglass Houghton
Preceded by Douglass Houghton	Mayor of Detroit; 1843	Succeeded by John R. Williams
Party political offices
Preceded by Philo C. Fuller	Whig nominee for Governor of Michigan; 1843	Succeeded by Stephen Vickery
Business positions
Preceded by George B. Wood	President of the American Medical Association; 1856–1857	Succeeded by Paul F. Eve
