= Ethel Lynn =

Ethel Lynn may refer to the following persons who may be commonly known as such:

- Ethel Grace Lynn
- Ethel Lynn Beers
