= Ethel Grace Lynn =

American writer and doctor (1881–1960)

Ethel Grace Lynn (13 February 1881 – 1960) was an American novelist, medical doctor, artist, public speaker, suffragist, socialist activist and political candidate.

== Family ==
Ethel was the youngest child born 13 February 1881 to Capt. Alfred Marcey Aplin (1837 - 1918) and Mary Elizabeth Winn (1842 - 1922). Her father, born in Ohio, had volunteered for service in the Civil War while in college. In 1875 he moved his family to California and became successful in the fruit business and land investments. Two of her siblings also became medical doctors - Myrtle A. Aplin and Guy E. Aplin.

She graduated from Cooper Medical college in San Francisco in 1898, interned in Lane Hospital and then immediately employed by the city and county hospital there. She was a physician in Napa State Hospital. She was one of the early women physicians to specialize in mental illness. She resigned to stay with her mother the last thirteen years of her mother's life, and the last nine of which were spent as in invalid.

The sisters had a falling out shortly after their father's death. Ethel filed a contest of the will of her late father alleging undue influence upon the part of her sister Dr. Myrtle G. Aplin and claiming the estate was worth $54,000 vs. Dr. Aplin's estimate of $30,000.

== Education ==
According to her AMA Physician Masterfile Ethel graduated from Pomona College in 1903. Her graduation from a medical college seems to be indicated by "Calif 1909" on the handwritten card.

== Political activism ==
Lynn was chairman of the education committee of the California Woman's Political League formed in 1911. They met in the Pacific Building. 1912 was a busy year for Lynn and the League. At the January meeting she was again on the Education committee. In February the League became involved in the controversy for the city to purchase Spring Valley Water Company. Among issues of concern was apparently a lack of transparency. In April Lynn and others unsuccessfully lobbied Attorney-General Webb to allow them to serve on juries. They then planned to have a law passed to confer the obligation upon them. In June she went on a speaking tour concerning the alleged evils of competition and capitalism. Possibly at this time she became a socialist. Also in June, writing for Organized Labor concerning the proposed Spring Valley Water purchase, she has a long and very detailed evaluation of the proposed purchase, arguing the city is going to overpay, and there is a better option anyway. She apparently argues to pay only book value cost vs. market and intangible value. But she understands facts and figures, and makes a compelling argument nonetheless. In September she was still touring giving a public address in Folsom, California, "Do We Want Socialism?" In 1913 she was one of "nearly fifty prominent clubwomen and social workers" signing a telegram to Governed Johnson "urging him to reprieve the dozen or more men now under sentence of death till the people can vote on an initiative measure to abolish capital punishment in California." In 1914 Lynn ran for Secretary of State on the Socialist ticket winning 10% of the vote. In 1915 she won 15% of the vote (again as a Socialist) for San Francisco coroner.

== Speaking tours ==
In addition to several talks on socialism and in support of her candidacy, Lynn also gave lectures on other topics including "Modern Science and the Atom," "Theosophy's Gift to Science," "Evolution," and in support of The Townsend Plan (proposed by Francis Townsend). She was reported to be an excellent speaker.

== Career ==
Besides her early medical practice, Dr. Lynn also worked as a chemist at an ink and dye plant in 1918. By the 1930 Federal Census Lynn gave her occupation as an artist in landscapes working on her own behalf. As a painter she often used the nom de plume "Harlo Lynn."

== Death ==
Lynn died 9 June 1960 from a stroke. Her last residence (among many over her lifetime) was 154 Edinburgh St., San Francisco, California. She left no survivors.

== Bibliography ==
- Lynn, Ethel (2020-08-18). The Adventures of a Woman Hobo.
