= Lonnie R. Bristow =

American physician (born 1930)

Lonnie Robert Bristow
- Born: 1930 (age 95–96); Harlem, New York City
- Education: Morehouse College; City College of New York; New York University Grossman School of Medicine
- Known for: President of American Medical Association (AMA); President of the American Society of Internal Medicine; Co-founding the Sullivan Commission; Dispelling myths on sickle cell trait; Promoting diversity in the medical profession; Introducing medical ethics into medical board exams; Assessing medical needs of disabled veterans
- Medical career
- Profession: Physician
- Field: Internal medicine
- Institutions: Delafield Hospital, Columbia University; University of California Berkeley Hospital
- Sub-specialties: Occupational medicine
- Research: Sickle cell disease

Lonnie Robert Bristow (born 1930) is an American physician and former president of the American Medical Association (AMA). In his early career he established a private practice in San Pablo, California, as an internist with a special interest in occupational medicine, and wrote on sickle cell disease and misinformation on sickle cell trait. As the first African American president of the AMA in its 148-year history, he headed the introduction of questions on medical ethics into medical board exams and encouraged education about HIV/AIDS.

Bristow was a member of the Quality of Healthcare in America Committee of the Institute of Medicine, which published To Err is Human in 1999, and Crossing the Quality Chasm in 2001. He co-founded the Sullivan Commission; an initiative to encourage diversity within the medical profession, and co-authored In the Nation's Compelling Interest, published in 2004. In 2005 he was chosen to chair a committee established to assess the medical needs of disabled veterans, which resulted in the 2007 A 21st Century System for Evaluating Veteran's Disability Benefits. He has also written on the UK's and Canada's socialized medicine, American health-care financing, problems with professional liability insurance, and the usage of cardiac care units.

== Early life and education ==
Lonnie Bristow was born in 1930 in Harlem, New York City, to Lonnie Harlis Bristow, a Baptist minister, and Vivian Wines Bristow, a nurse at Sydenham Hospital. He was inspired by visits to his mother at her workplace to enter the medical profession. He later recounted that "one of the things that most impressed me in those visits was the realization that many cultures were represented on the staff." He attended Morehouse College in Atlanta, Georgia, for two years, followed by a four-year enrollment in the United States Navy, before returning to his studies. He graduated from the City College of New York with a bachelor's degree in 1953 and received his medical degree from the New York University Grossman School of Medicine in 1957.

== Early career ==
Bristow completed his internship in 1958 at the Veteran's Administration Hospital in San Francisco and New York's Delafield Hospital, Columbia University. He completed his residency at the University of California Berkeley Hospital. In 1964, he established a private practice in San Pablo, California, as an internist with a special interest in occupational medicine, sickle cell anaemia and HIV/AIDS. Having been affiliated with the American Medical Association (AMA) since 1958, he joined it in 1970, two years after the AMA began to admit Black physicians.

Before universal testing of newborns, and two years after drafting of a California state policy to "detect, as early as possible, sickle cell anaemia", it was announced that it would be enforced, with the requirement to test "all black hospital patients in California". Bristow, an advocate for widespread voluntary testing for sickle cell disease, and having been president of the California Society of Internal Medicine since 1974, was appointed to lead a committee established to re-draft the rules. He had noted problems in the policy of mandatory testing of all black people, saying at a press conference that "who is black or how black is black" is not always clear. He also criticized the screening programs for providing inappropriate counselling. One problem he highlighted was that it could lead to the racial status providing grounds to increase insurance premiums.

== Later career ==
In 1985, following a protest by around 200 medical students led by Benjamin Spock, Bristow was elected onto the AMA board of trustees. At the time, he told the press that he wanted to show that "competence is not determined by skin color", and that he would advocate for better health care for minorities. During his tenure as Chair of the AMA Board of Trustees, it was successful in obtaining partial AMA support for the Clinton health care plan of 1993.

In June 1995 Bristow became president of the AMA. This made him the first African American president of the AMA in its 148-year history. As AMA president, he headed the introduction of questions on medical ethics into medical board exams and encouraged education about HIV/AIDS. He had previously been a member of with the Centers for Disease Control Advisory Committee on the Prevention of HIV Infection, and the Quadrennial Advisory Council on Social Security.

Bristow was the first black president of the American Society of Internal Medicine, elected in 1981. He has consulted on numerous health issues in different organizations, including serving on advisory committees for the Centers for Disease Control and Prevention on smoking (1987–1994) and HIV infection (1989–1993). He was elected to the National Academy of Medicine in 1977.

Bristow was a member of the Quality of Healthcare in America Committee of the Institute of Medicine (IOM), which published To Err is Human in 1999, and Crossing the Quality Chasm in 2001. He co-founded, with Louis W. Sullivan, the Sullivan Commission, an initiative to encourage diversity within the medical profession. Following the publication of Missing Persons, he led and co-authored the IOM's In the Nation's Compelling Interest; Ensuring Diversity in the Health-Care Workforce, published in 2004. The report found that the medical workforce in the United States was not as diverse as the population it served. The document adds to evidence that calls for greater racial and ethnic diversity among health professionals, with the aim of improving access to care for racial and ethnic minorities. In 2005 he was chosen to chair a committee established to assess the medical needs of disabled veterans. It resulted in the 2007 A 21st Century System for Evaluating Veteran's Disability Benefits. He has also written on the UK's and Canada's socialized medicine, American health-care financing, problems with professional liability insurance, and the usage of cardiac care units.

== Personal life and family ==
Bristow was married to Margaret Jeter from 1957 to 1961, when they divorced. That year he married Marilyn Hingslage, a nurse; she died in 2017. He has three children, one from his first marriage and two from the second. His son, Robert Bristow, is an obstetrician-gynecologist.

== Awards and honours ==
The California Medical Action Committee awarded Bristow their Award of Excellence in 1976. The following year he was elected to the Institute of Medicine of the National Academy of Sciences. In 1989, he received the Contra Costa County Humanitarian of the Year award, and the following year received California's Most Distinguished Internist Award. He holds honorary doctorates from Morehouse School of Medicine (1994), Wayne State University School of Medicine (1995), and the City College of New York (1995).

== Selected publications ==
- Bristow, L. R. (July 1974). "The myth of sickle cell trait". The Western Journal of Medicine. 121 (1): 77–82. ISSN 0093-0415. PMC 1129505. PMID 4840172.
- Bristow, Lonnie R. (June 1979). "Medical ethics: quo vadis?". The Bulletin of the American College of Physicians. 2 (6): 417–418. ISSN 0002-8010. PMID 11662592.
- Bristow, L. R. (March 1989). "AIDS and the response of organized medicine". The Journal of Legal Medicine. 10 (1): 11–17. doi:10.1080/01947648909513557. ISSN 0194-7648. PMID 2708901.
- Todd, J. S.; Rennie, D.; McAfee, R. E.; Bristow, L. R.; Painter, J. T.; Reardon, T. R.; Johnson, D. H.; Corlin, R. F.; Coble, Y. D.; Dickey, N. W. (19 July 1995). "The Brown and Williamson documents. Where do we go from here?". JAMA. 274 (3): 256–258. doi:10.1001/jama.1995.03530030076038. ISSN 0098-7484. PMID 7609236.
- Bristow, Lonnie R. (1 June 2003). "Diversity and the road to the "land of best care"". The Virtual Mentor. 5 (6): virtualmentor.2003.5.6.pfor1–0306. doi:10.1001/virtualmentor.2003.5.6.pfor1-0306. ISSN 1937-7010. PMID 23268950.
- Smedley, BD; Stith Butler, A; Bristow, LR (2004). Institute of Medicine (US) Committee on Institutional and Policy-Level Strategies for Increasing the Diversity of the U.S. Healthcare Workforce. National Academies Press (US). doi:10.17226/10885. ISBN 978-0-309-09125-1. PMID 25009857.
