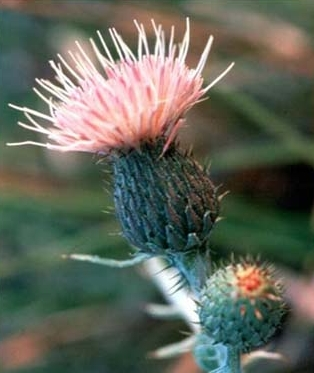

Conservation status
- Vulnerable (NatureServe)

Scientific classification
- Kingdom: Plantae
- Clade: Tracheophytes
- Clade: Angiosperms
- Clade: Eudicots
- Clade: Asterids
- Order: Asterales
- Family: Asteraceae
- Genus: Cirsium
- Species: C. pitcheri

Binomial name
- Cirsium pitcheri (Torr. ex Eat.) Torr. & A.Gray

Synonyms
- Carduus pitcheri (Torr. ex Eaton) Porter; Cnicus pitcheri Torr. ex Eaton

= Cirsium pitcheri =

Species of thistle

Cirsium pitcheri, sometimes called Pitcher's thistle or dune thistle, is a species of thistle native to sand dune shorelines along the upper Great Lakes. It is native to Indiana, Illinois, Michigan, Wisconsin, and Ontario. It is listed by the U.S. Fish and Wildlife Service as a threatened species.

== Description ==
Pitcher's thistle is a plant of modest appearance through much of its lifespan; it concentrates most of its biomass in a massive taproot that can be 6 feet (2 m) in length. Its long, narrow, gray-green leaves are protected by spines and dense, silvery hairs. Between 2 and 8 years after germination, the juvenile thistle abruptly matures and sends forth a flower stalk of 100 cm (40 inches) or more in height. At the top of the blooming shoot is a spectacular effusive flower head, ranging in color from creamy white to very light pink, and guarded by spines. Some individuals may be quite bushy, and produce numerous flowering heads. Usually at least 5 years are required for the thistle to reach maturity. Pitcher's thistle is monocarpic; after flowering once, the plant dies. Most of its seeds do not disperse very far, in fact, entire heads are occasionally buried, producing clusters of seedlings.

The Pitcher's thistle is adapted to life on open, windswept, semi-stable sand dune surfaces. It can flower at any time from mid-June through mid-September, depending on the amount of energy it has stored in its taproot and on local rain conditions immediately prior to the flowering.

== History and identification ==
The Pitcher's thistle was first identified by Dr. Zina Pitcher, an amateur naturalist and U.S. Army field surgeon stationed at Fort Brady, Sault Ste. Marie, Michigan. In an unknown summer at some point in the 1820s, Dr. Pitcher was granted leave to go on an adventure camping trip west of the fort on a sandy shoreline of Lake Superior. While exploring what are now the Grand Sable Dunes of the Pictured Rocks National Lakeshore, Dr. Pitcher discovered a Pitcher's thistle in flower. The physician shipped the specimen to botanists who published and named it in his honor, Cirsium pitcheri.

== Distribution ==
The Pitcher's thistle is found exclusively along the shorelines of Lake Huron, Lake Michigan, and Lake Superior, particularly in areas of sand dunes. Two of the largest remaining populations have been identified in the Nordhouse Dunes area of the Manistee National Forest, and within Sleeping Bear Dunes National Lakeshore. In addition, Pitcher's thistle continues to grow and flower in some smaller state parks and private tracts along these lake shores.

== Conservation ==
Great Lakes dune habitat is threatened by invasive species such as spotted knapweed. In addition, the high economic value of Great lakes shoreline for real estate development continues to threaten the Pitcher's thistle. Although it can be locally abundant in areas of relatively undisturbed habitat, the thistle is highly vulnerable because it is adapted to live in locations where many people would like to build vacation homes and resorts and is therefore critically threatened by anthropogenic habitat destruction. This fact, as well as its general vulnerability due to its specialized habitat and restricted range, has led to Pitcher's Thistle being federally listed as a threatened species by the U.S. government; it is also listed as either threatened or endangered at the state level. In Canada it is listed as endangered at both the provincial (Ontario) and federal level.
