= De Garmo Jones =

American politician

Mayor of Detroit
- In office 1839–1839
- Preceded by: Asher B. Bates
- Succeeded by: Zina Pitcher

Personal details
- Born: November 11, 1787 Albany, New York
- Died: November 14, 1846 (aged 59) Detroit, Michigan
- Party: Whig
- Spouse: Catherine Annin

De Garmo Jones (November 11, 1787 – November 14, 1846) was a businessman, state senator, and mayor of Detroit.

== Biography ==
De Garmo Jones was born in 1787 in Albany, New York; the first name of his father is unknown but his mother was Rachel De Garmo, daughter of a prominent Albany family. He served as a sutler during the War of 1812, during which time he passed through Detroit. In March, 1818, Jones married Catherine Annin. The couple immediately moved to Detroit, arriving in 1819. De Garmo and Catherine Annin Jones had seven children, of which three survived them: Matilda Cass Jones (born 1833, married Augustus Porter Thompson), De Garmo Jones (born 1835, married Caroline Sauger), and Alice Kercheval Jones (born 1838, married Albert M. Steele).

De Garmo Jones purchased a farm near the city of Detroit, located between what is now Third Avenue and the alley east of Fourth Street. Over time, Jones increased the value of the farm, making him and his heirs wealthy. Jones had a diverse portfolio of business interests: he was one of the first stockholders in the Bank of Michigan, one of the first directors of the Detroit and St. Joseph Railroad (later the Michigan Central Railroad), and developed copper mines near Lake Superior. He also owned interests in shipping, warehousing, and construction companies, and built the first capitol building on the state of Michigan.

Jones was a member of the Whig Party, and served several times as an alderman of the city of Detroit (1827, 1830, and 1838), and was elected mayor in 1839. He also served as Adjutant-General of the territory of Michigan in 1829 and as a state senator in 1840-1841. His contemporary George C. Bates said of him:

Sudden and quick in quarrel, with a temper requiring a curb bit, Mr. Jones was a sort of western Vanderbilt, with a great big head, enlarged views, interesting industry, who saw far ahead into the future, and had he lived longer, would have cut deeper and deeper into the tablet of time his career, for he was a most public spirited, enterprising, go ahead man.

De Garmo Jones died on November 14, 1846, leaving an estate valued at $250,000. His wife Catherine died in 1865, leaving an estate valued at $500,000 (~$8.23 million in 2025).

Political offices
Preceded by Asher B. Bates	Mayor of Detroit; 1839	Succeeded by Zina Pitcher
