= AMA Physician Masterfile =

The American Medical Association (AMA) Physician Professional Data (formerly known as the AMA Physician Masterfile) includes current and historical data on all physicians, including AMA members and nonmembers, and graduates of foreign medical schools who reside in the United States and who have met the educational and credentialing requirements necessary for recognition as physicians. A Masterfile record is created and ME number assigned when entering medical school or through the ECFMG. For medical students, there are two primary methods to create the initial record - the Student Outreach Program and the annual freshman matriculation file received from the Association of American Medical Colleges (AAMC).

The Physician Professional Data spans from undergraduate medical education through practice and comprise databases of

- 125 LCME-accredited medical schools
- 7,900 ACGME-accredited graduate medical education programs
- 1,600 teaching institutions; 820,000 physicians; and 19,000 medical group practices.

Physician records are never removed from the AMA Physician Professional Data, even in the case of a physician's death.

== Student outreach: steps for record creation ==
The Student Outreach Program creates affiliate student records in a database specifically designed to support AMA membership recruitment activities. The record includes:

1. student membership application is received
2. information is entered into the Student Outreach Database using the student supplied SSN as the initial unique identifier
3. SOD data loaded into the AMA Masterfile with status of "unverified"
  1. student affiliate membership status is assigned
  2. payment is processed
  3. record with corresponding ME number is created.
4. primary source notification of enrollment in an LCME-accredited (Liaison Committee on Medical Education) program received through the AAMC freshman matriculation file.
5. student affiliate records stored in the Masterfile are matched to AAMC records.
6. matched record now contains both an ME number and SSN and has been verified by the primary source. # affiliate status is removed and a permanent unique record on the Masterfile is established.

"Unverified" affiliate student records are considered and use of the data is limited to providing membership benefits and membership payment processing.

The AMA Masterfile has been in use since 1906.

== Uses ==
The data are shared with other organizations and agencies who credential physicians and are used to identify individuals who attempt to fraudulently assume the credentials of deceased physicians.

The AMA also charges data mining companies such as IQVIA a fee for access to the Physician Professional Data, which they then use to identify physicians within prescription data purchased from pharmacies. This enriched, prescriber-identified prescription data is then sold to pharmaceutical companies that use it to monitor marketing effectiveness.

== United States medical students and physicians ==
An AMA Physician Professional Data record is established when individuals enter medical schools accredited by the Liaison Committee on Medical Education (LCME), or in the case of international medical graduates (IMG), upon entry into ACGME-accredited programs. When creating a record, the database is first checked to see if the person has a record using legal last name, legal first name, date of birth, school code, and state of residence to identify unique student entities when creating physician records.

Each AMA Physician Professional Data record includes

- physician's name
- medical school
- year of graduation
- gender
- birthplace
- birthdate
- Medical Education (ME) Number (unique identifying id)
- Additional data added from primary data sources or from surveying the physicians directly as the physicians' training and career develop
  - residency training
  - state licensure
  - board certification
  - geographical location
  - address
  - type of practice
  - present employment,
  - practice specialty

== International medical graduates ==
Data on international medical graduates (IMGs) are included in the AMA Physician Professional Data when IMGs enter residency programs accredited by the Accreditation Council on Graduate Medical Education (ACGME). The AMA Physician Professional Data also includes data on IMGs who are licensed to practice medicine but who have not entered ACGME-accredited programs and on physicians licensed to practice medicine in the United States but who are temporarily located abroad.

== ME Number ==
The ME Number is created after a student record is created. Social Security number was used for ME Number and is widely used by internal AMA processing systems. The ME number is assigned by the AMA Finance Department.

== Controversy ==
In July 2007, it was publicized that the AMA discloses Masterfile Physician Data to pharmaceutical companies. In 2000, the AMA earned $20 million from the sale of data from the MasterFile. Currently, the AMA brings in over $40 million a year licensing the database.
