= Medical Education Number =

The Medical Education Number (ME Number) is an 11-digit identifier assigned to every physician member of the American Medical Association (AMA) in the United States. It is used for identification and recording basic physician information and Continuing Medical Education (CME) credits. It is an important element in the administrative and educational framework for physicians in the United States.

== Assignment and structure ==
The ME Number is assigned when a student begins medical school and can remain unchanged throughout their career. The number is structured as follows:

- First 5 digits: Represent the Medical School Code, identifying the medical school.
- Digits 6 and 7: Indicate the expected graduation year.
- Final 4 digits: Uniquely assigned to the physician.

== Usage and accessibility ==
The ME Number is prominently displayed on the physician's AMA membership card, serving as an easy reference for the physician and various administrative processes. Given that every physician in the United States is assigned an ME Number, even those who are not current members of the AMA can obtain their ME Number by contacting the American Medical Association directly.

== Function and importance ==
The ME Number functions as a unique identifying key field within the AMA Physician Masterfile. This Masterfile is a comprehensive database that maintains records for every physician practicing in the United States. The unique nature of the ME Number allows for precise and efficient retrieval of a physician's records, ensuring accurate tracking of their professional information and CME credits.

== AMA membership eligibility ==
Members of the AMA may include:

- Physicians located in the United States, who possess the degree of doctor of medicine (MD) or doctor of osteopathic medicine (DO), or a recognized international equivalent.
- Resident physicians who possess the United States degree of MD or DO, or a recognized international equivalent, and are serving in residencies or fellowships approved by the American College of Graduate Medical Education (ACGME) or the American Osteopathic Association (AOA).
- Medical students enrolled in an educational program provided by a college of medicine or osteopathic medicine accredited by the Liaison Committee on Medical Education (LCME) or American Osteopathic Association (AOA) leading to the MD or DO degree. This includes those students who are on an approved sabbatical, provided that the student will be in good standing upon returning from the sabbatical.
