= National Patient Safety Foundation =

- Merged into: Institute for Healthcare Improvement
- Founded: 1997
- Dissolved: May 2017; 9 years ago
- Purpose: Patient safety, quality, health care
- Location: Boston, Massachusetts, United States
- Method: Education, outreach, research
- Website: http://www.ihi.org/patientsafety

The National Patient Safety Foundation (NPSF) was an independent not-for-profit organization created in 1997 to advance the safety of health care workers and patients, and disseminate strategies to prevent harm. In May 2017, the Institute for Healthcare Improvement (IHI) and NPSF began working together as one organization.

== History ==
The National Patient Safety Foundation began as an idea proposed in 1996 at a large conference on medical error that was organized by the American Association for the Advancement of Science, the American Medical Association (AMA), and the Annenberg Center for Health Sciences at Eisenhower Medical Center in California and funded by The Robert Wood Johnson Foundation. At that meeting, representatives of the AMA announced plans to form a foundation that would be "a collaborative initiative involving all members of the healthcare community aimed at stimulating leadership, fostering awareness, and enhancing patient safety knowledge creation, dissemination and implementation."

Among the foundation's early activities was a survey of public opinion on patient safety issues. The survey, conducted by Louis Harris & Associates (2000) revealed that more than 4 out of 5 respondents (84%) had heard about a situation where a medical mistake had been made. More than one-third of respondents (42%) had been involved, either personally or through a friend or relative, in a situation where a medical error was made.

In 2007, NPSF formed the Lucian Leape Institute, a think tank named for Dr. Lucian Leape.

== Education and professional development ==
Educating health professionals about patient safety best practices is a key area of focus for NPSF. Since the annual NPSF Patient Safety Congress has brought together health leaders, patient safety professionals, and patient advocates. In recent years, the meeting has touched on some of the most pressing concerns in health care, such as the move toward patient satisfaction as a measure of quality, engaging patients and families in their care, and the use of simulation to teach and promote safe practices.

Another of the foundation's areas of focus is elevating patient safety as a medical discipline and a career path for medical professionals. The American Society of Professionals in Patient Safety, which was formed in January 2011, was introduced as the first such organization for individuals (as opposed to organizations).

NPSF was involved in creating the Certification Board for Professionals in Patient Safety. Established in 2012, the CBPPS is an independent body charged with developing and overseeing a credentialing exam for the patient safety field.
