= Socialized medicine =

Government-run health care system

Socialized medicine is a term used in the United States to describe and discuss systems of universal health care—medical and hospital care for all by means of government regulation of health care and subsidies derived from taxation. Because of historically negative associations with socialism in American culture, the term is usually used pejoratively in American political discourse. The term was first widely used in the United States by advocates of the American Medical Association in opposition to President Harry S. Truman's 1947 health care initiative. It was later used in opposition to Medicare. The Affordable Care Act has been described in terms of socialized medicine, but the act's objective is rather socialized insurance, not government ownership of hospitals and other facilities as is common in other nations.

== Background ==
The original meaning was confined to systems in which the government operates health care facilities and employs health care professionals. This narrower usage would apply to the British National Health Service hospital trusts and health systems that operate in other countries as diverse as Finland, Spain, Israel, and Cuba. The United States Veterans Health Administration and the medical departments of the U.S. Army, Navy, and Air Force, would also fall under this narrow definition. When used in that way, the narrow definition permits a clear distinction from single payer health insurance systems, in which the government finances health care but is not involved in care delivery.

More recently, American conservative critics of health care reform have attempted to broaden the term by applying it to any publicly funded system. Canada's Medicare system and most of the UK's NHS general practitioner and dental services, which are systems where health care is delivered by private business with partial or total government funding, fit the broader definition, as do the health care systems of most of Western Europe. In the United States, Medicare, Medicaid, and the US military's TRICARE fall under that definition. In specific regard to military benefits of a (currently) volunteer military, such care is an owed benefit to a specific group as part of an economic exchange, which muddies the definition yet further.

Most industrialized countries and many developing countries operate some form of publicly funded health care with universal coverage as the goal. According to the Institute of Medicine and others, the United States is the only wealthy, industrialized nation that does not provide universal health care.

Jonathan Oberlander, a professor of health policy at the University of North Carolina, maintains that the term is merely a political pejorative that has been defined to mean different levels of government involvement in health care, depending on what the speaker was arguing against at the time.

The term is often used by conservatives in the U.S. to imply that the privately run health care system would become controlled by the government, thereby associating it with socialism, which has negative connotations to some people in American political culture. As such, its usage is controversial, and at odds with the views of conservatives in other countries prepared to defend socialized medicine such as Margaret Thatcher. According to a 2018 Gallup poll, 37% of American adults have a positive view of socialism, including 57% of Democrat-leaning voters and 16% of Republican-leaning voters.

== History of term ==
When the term "socialized medicine" first appeared in the United States in the early 20th century, it bore no negative connotations. Otto P. Geier, chairman of the Preventive Medicine Section of the American Medical Association, was quoted in The New York Times in 1917 as praising socialized medicine as a way to "discover disease in its incipiency", help end "venereal diseases, alcoholism, tuberculosis", and "make a fundamental contribution to social welfare". However, by the 1930s, the term socialized medicine was routinely used negatively by conservative opponents of publicly funded health care who wished to imply it represented socialism, and by extension, communism. Universal health care and national health insurance were first proposed by U.S. President Theodore Roosevelt. President Franklin D. Roosevelt later championed it, as did Harry S. Truman as part of his Fair Deal and many others. Truman announced before describing his proposal that: "This is not socialized medicine".

Government involvement in health care was ardently opposed by the AMA, which distributed posters to doctors with slogans such as "Socialized medicine ... will undermine the democratic form of government." According to T.R. Reid (The Healing of America, 2009):

The term ["socialized medicine"] was popularized by a public relations firm [Whitaker and Baxter] working for the American Medical Association in 1947 to disparage President Truman's proposal for a national health care system. It was a label, at the dawn of the cold war, meant to suggest that anybody advocating universal access to health care must be a communist. And the phrase has retained its political power for six decades.

The AMA conducted a nationwide campaign called Operation Coffee Cup during the late 1950s and early 1960s in opposition to the Democrats' plans to extend Social Security to include health insurance for the elderly, later known as Medicare. As part of the plan, doctors' wives would organize coffee meetings in an attempt to convince acquaintances to write letters to Congress opposing the program. In 1961, Ronald Reagan recorded a disc entitled Ronald Reagan Speaks Out Against Socialized Medicine warning its audience the "dangers" that socialized medicine could bring. The recording was widely played at Operation Coffee Cup meetings. Other pressure groups began to extend the definition from state managed health care to any form of state finance in health care. President Dwight Eisenhower opposed plans to expand government role in healthcare during his time in office.

In more recent times, the term was brought up again by Republicans in the 2008 U.S. presidential election. In July 2007, one month after the release of Michael Moore's film Sicko, Rudy Giuliani, the front-runner for the 2008 Republican presidential nomination, attacked the health care plans of Democratic presidential candidates as socialized medicine that was European and socialist, Giuliani claimed that he had a better chance of surviving prostate cancer in the US than he would have had in England and went on to repeat the claim in campaign speeches for three months before making them in a radio advertisement. After the radio ad began running, the use of the statistic was widely criticized by FactCheck.org, PolitiFact.com, by The Washington Post, and others who consulted leading cancer experts and found that Giuliani's cancer survival statistics to be false, misleading or "flat wrong", the numbers having been reported to have been obtained from an opinion article by Giuliani health care advisor David Gratzer, a Canadian psychiatrist in the Manhattan Institute's City Journal where Gratzer was a senior fellow. The Times reported that the British Health Secretary pleaded with Giuliani to stop using the NHS as a political football in American presidential politics. The article reported that not only the figures were five years out of date and wrong but also that US health experts disputed both the accuracy of Giuliani's figures and questioned whether it was fair to make a direct comparison. The St. Petersburg Times said that Giuliani's tactic of "injecting a little fear" exploited cancer, which was "apparently not beneath a survivor with presidential aspirations". Giuliani's repetition of the error even after it had been pointed out to him earned him more criticism and was awarded four "Pinocchios" by the Washington Post for recidivism.

Health care professionals have tended to avoid the term because of its pejorative nature, but if they use it, they do not include publicly funded private medical schemes such as Medicaid. Opponents of state involvement in health care tend to use the looser definition.

The term is widely used by the American media and pressure groups. Some have even stretched use of the term to cover any regulation of health care, publicly financed or not. The term is often used to criticize publicly provided health care outside the US, but rarely to describe similar health care programs there, such as the Veterans Administration clinics and hospitals, military health care, or the single payer programs such as Medicaid and Medicare. Many conservatives use the term to evoke negative sentiment toward health care reform that would involve increasing government involvement in the US health care system.

Medical staff, academics and most professionals in the field and international bodies such as the World Health Organization tend to avoid use of the term. Outside the US, the terms most commonly used are universal health care or public health care. According to health economist Uwe Reinhardt, "strictly speaking, the term "socialized medicine" should be reserved for health systems in which the government operates the production of health care and provides its financing." Still others say the term has no meaning at all.

In more recent times, the term has gained a more positive reappraisal. Documentary movie maker Michael Moore in his documentary Sicko pointed out that Americans do not talk about public libraries or the police or the fire department as being "socialized" and do not have negative opinions of these. Media personalities such as Oprah Winfrey have also weighed in behind the concept of public involvement in healthcare. A 2008 poll indicates that Americans are sharply divided when asked about their views of the expression socialized medicine, with a large percentage of Democrats holding favorable views, while a large percentage of Republicans holding unfavorable views. Independents tend to somewhat favor it.

== History in United States ==
The Veterans Health Administration, the Military Health System, and the Indian Health Service are examples of socialized medicine in the stricter sense of government administered care, but they are for limited populations.

Medicare and Medicaid are forms of publicly funded health care, which fits the looser definition of socialized medicine. Part B coverage (Medical) requires a monthly premium of $96.40 (and possibly higher) and the first $135 of costs per year also fall to the senior, not the government.

A poll released in February 2008, conducted by the Harvard School of Public Health and Harris Interactive, indicated that Americans are currently divided in their opinions of socialized medicine, and this split correlates strongly with their political party affiliation.

Two thirds of those polled said they understood the term "socialized medicine" very well or somewhat well. When offered descriptions of what such a system could mean, strong majorities believed that it means "the government makes sure everyone has health insurance" (79%) and "the government pays most of the cost of health care" (73%). One third (32%) felt that socialized medicine is a system in which "the government tells doctors what to do". The poll showed "striking differences" by party affiliation. Among Republicans polled, 70% said that socialized medicine would be worse than the current system. The same percentage of Democrats (70%) said that a socialized medical system would be better than the current system. Independents were more evenly split, with 43% saying socialized medicine would be better and 38% worse.

According to Robert J. Blendon, professor of health policy and political analysis at the Harvard School of Public Health, "The phrase 'socialized medicine' really resonates as a pejorative with Republicans. However, that so many Democrats believe that socialized medicine would be an improvement is an indication of their dissatisfaction with our current system." Physicians' opinions have become more favorable toward "socialized medicine".

A 2008 survey of doctors, published in Annals of Internal Medicine, shows that physicians support universal health care and national health insurance by almost 2 to 1.

== Politics ==
While the United States is an exception among high-income countries in lacking an universal healthcare system, the politics of healthcare should not be thought of as entirely uncontentious in countries which have adopted it. In the aftermath the 2008 financial crisis and the resulting austerity, welfare systems in Europe are seen as less reslilant against political pressure as previously thought. There are also countries, such as post-Soviet states in economic crises during the dissolution and Chile, which adopted and subsequently lost universal healthcare. However, as the policy is generally popular, there are obstacles to convincing the majority of the population to vote against their own interests, whereas vested interests have thus far been successful in blocking expansion to health coverage.

In the United States, neither of the main parties favors a socialized system that puts the government in charge of hospitals or doctors, but they do have different approaches to financing and access. Democrats tend to be favorably inclined towards reform that involves more government control over health care financing and citizens' right of access to health care. Republicans are broadly in favor of the status quo, or a reform of the financing system that gives more power to the citizen, often through tax credits.

Supporters of government involvement in health care argue that government involvement ensures access, quality, and addresses market failures specific to the health care markets. When the government covers the cost of health care, there is no need for individuals or their employers to pay for private insurance.

Opponents also claim that the absence of a market mechanism may slow innovation in treatment and research.

=== Cost of care ===
Socialized medicine amongst industrialized countries tends to be more affordable than in systems where there is little government involvement. A 2003 study examined costs and outputs in the U.S. and other industrialized countries and broadly concluded that the U.S. spends so much because its health care system is more costly. It noted that "the United States spent considerably more on health care than any other country ... [yet] most measures of aggregate utilization such as physician visits per capita and hospital days per capita were below the OECD median. Since spending is a product of both the goods and services used and their prices, this implies that much higher prices are paid in the United States than in other countries. The researchers examined possible reasons and concluded that input costs were high (salaries, cost of pharmaceutical), and that the complex payment system in the U.S. added higher administrative costs. Comparison countries in Canada and Europe were much more willing to exert monopsony power to drive down prices, whilst the highly fragmented buy side of the U.S. health system was one factor that could explain the relatively high prices in the United States of America. The current fee-for-service payment system also stimulates expensive care by promoting procedures over visits through financially rewarding the former ($1,500 – for doing a 10-minute procedure) vs. the latter ($50 – for a 30–45 minute visit). This causes the proliferation of specialists (more expensive care) and creating, what Don Berwick refers to as, "the world's best healthcare system for rescue care".

Other studies have found no consistent and systematic relationship between the type of financing of health care and cost containment; the efficiency of operation of the health care system itself appears to depend much more on how providers are paid and how the delivery of care is organized than on the method used to raise these funds.

Some supporters argue that government involvement in health care would reduce costs not just because of the exercise of monopsony power, e.g. in drug purchasing, but also because it eliminates profit margins and administrative overhead associated with private insurance, and because it can make use of economies of scale in administration. In certain circumstances, a volume purchaser may be able to guarantee sufficient volume to reduce overall prices while providing greater profitability to the seller, such as in so-called "purchase commitment" programs. Economist Arnold Kling attributes the present cost crisis mainly to the practice of what he calls premium medicine, which overuses expensive forms of technology that is of marginal or no proven benefit.

Milton Friedman has argued that government has weak incentives to reduce costs because "nobody spends somebody else's money as wisely or as frugally as he spends his own". Others contend that health care consumption is not like other consumer consumption. Firstly there is a negative utility of consumption (consuming more health care does not make one better off) and secondly there is an information asymmetry between consumer and supplier.

Paul Krugman and Robin Wells argue that all of the evidence indicates that public insurance of the kind available in several European countries achieves equal or better results at much lower cost, a conclusion that also applies within the United States. In terms of actual administrative costs, Medicare spent less than 2% of its resources on administration, while private insurance companies spent more than 13%. The Cato Institute argues that the 2% Medicare cost figure ignores all costs shifted to doctors and hospitals, and alleges that Medicare is not very efficient at all when those costs are incorporated. Some studies have found that the U.S. wastes more on bureaucracy (compared to the Canadian level), and that this excess administrative cost would be sufficient to provide health care to the uninsured population in the U.S.

Notwithstanding the arguments about Medicare, there is overall less bureaucracy in socialized systems than in the present mixed U.S. system. Spending on administration in Finland is 2.1% of all health care costs, and in the UK the figure is 3.3% whereas the U.S. spends 7.3% of all expenditures on administration.

=== Quality of care ===
Some in the U.S. claim that socialized medicine would reduce health care quality. The quantitative evidence for this claim is not clear. The WHO has used Disability Adjusted Life Expectancy (the number of years an average person can expect to live in good health) as a measure of a nation's health achievement, and has ranked its member nations by this measure. The U.S. ranking was 24th, worse than similar industrial countries with high public funding of health such as Canada (ranked 5th), the UK (12th), Sweden (4th), France (3rd) and Japan (1st). But the U.S. ranking was better than some other European countries such as Ireland, Denmark and Portugal, which came 27th, 28th and 29th respectively. Finland, with its relatively high death rate from guns and renowned high suicide rate came above the U.S. in 20th place. The British have a Care Quality Commission that commissions independent surveys of the quality of care given in its health institutions and these are publicly accessible over the internet. These determine whether health organizations are meeting public standards for quality set by government and allows regional comparisons. Whether these results indicate a better or worse situation to that in other countries such as the U.S. is hard to tell because these countries tend to lack a similar set of standards.

=== Taxation ===
Opponents claim that socialized medicine would require higher taxes but international comparisons do not support this; the ratio of public to private spending on health is lower in the U.S. than that of Canada, Australia, New Zealand, Japan, or any EU country, yet the per capita tax funding of health in those countries is already lower than that of the United States.

Taxation is not necessarily an unpopular form of funding for health care. In England, a survey for the British Medical Association of the general public showed overwhelming support for the tax funding of health care. Nine out of ten people agreed or strongly agreed with a statement that the NHS should be funded from taxation with care being free at the point of use.

An opinion piece in The Wall Street Journal by two conservative Republicans argues that government sponsored health care will legitimatize support for government services generally, and make an activist government acceptable. "Once a large number of citizens get their health care from the state, it dramatically alters their attachment to government. Every time a tax cut is proposed, the guardians of the new medical-welfare state will argue that tax cuts would come at the expense of health care -- an argument that would resonate with middle-class families entirely dependent on the government for access to doctors and hospitals."

=== Innovation ===
Some in the U.S. argue that if government were to use its size to bargain down health care prices, this would undermine American leadership in medical innovation. It is argued that the high level of spending in the U.S. health care system and its tolerance of waste is actually beneficial because it underpins American leadership in medical innovation, which is crucial not just for Americans, but for the entire world.

Others point out that the American health care system spends more on state-of-the-art treatment for people who have good insurance, and spending is reduced on those lacking it and question the costs and benefits of some medical innovations, noting, for example, that "rising spending on new medical technologies designed to address heart disease has not meant that more patients have survived".

=== Access ===
One of the goals of socialized medicine systems is ensuring universal access to health care. Opponents of socialized medicine say that access for low-income individuals can be achieved by means other than socialized medicine, for example, income-related subsidies can function without public provision of either insurance or medical services. Economist Milton Friedman said the role of the government in health care should be restricted to financing hard cases. Universal coverage can also be achieved by making purchase of insurance compulsory. For example, European countries with socialized medicine in the broader sense, such as Germany and The Netherlands, operate in this way. A legal obligation to purchase health insurance is akin to a mandated health tax, and the use of public subsidies is a form of directed income redistribution via the tax system. Such systems give the consumer a free choice amongst competing insurers whilst achieving universality to a government directed minimum standard.

Compulsory health insurance or savings are not limited to so-called socialized medicine, however. Singapore's health care system, which is often referred to as a free-market or mixed system, makes use of a combination of compulsory participation and state price controls to achieve the same goals.

=== Rationing (access, coverage, price, and time) ===
Part of the current debate about health care in the United States revolves around whether the Affordable Care Act as part of health care reform will result in a more systematic and logical allocation of health care. Opponents tend to believe that the law will eventually result in a government takeover of health care and ultimately to socialized medicine and rationing based not on being able to afford the care you want but on whether a third party other than the patient and the doctor decides whether the procedure or the cost is justifiable. Supporters of reform point out that health care rationing already exists in the United States through insurance companies issuing denial for reimbursement on the grounds that the insurance company believes the procedure is experimental or will not assist even though the doctor has recommended it. A public insurance plan was not included in the Affordable Care Act but some argue that it would have added to health care access choices, and others argue that the central issue is whether health care is rationed sensibly.

Opponents of reform invoke the term socialized medicine because they say it will lead to health care rationing by denial of coverage, denial of access, and use of waiting lists, but often do so without acknowledging coverage denial, lack of access and waiting lists exist in the U.S. health care system currently or that waiting lists in the U.S. are sometimes longer than the waiting lists in countries with socialized medicine. Proponents of the reform proposal point out a public insurer is not akin to a socialized medicine system because it will have to negotiate rates with the medical industry just as other insurers do and cover its cost with premiums charged to policyholders just as other insurers do without any form of subsidy.

There is a frequent misunderstanding to think that waiting happens in places like the United Kingdom and Canada but does not happen in the United States. For instance it is not uncommon even for emergency cases in some U.S. hospitals to be boarded on beds in hallways for 48 hours or more due to lack of inpatient beds and people in the U.S. rationed out by being unable to afford their care are simply never counted and may never receive the care they need, a factor that is often overlooked. Statistics about waiting times in national systems are an honest approach to the issue of those waiting for access to care. Everyone waiting for care is reflected in the data, which, in the UK for example, are used to inform debate, decision-making and research within the government and the wider community. Some people in the U.S. are rationed out of care by unaffordable care or denial of access by HMOs and insurers or simply because they cannot afford co-pays or deductibles even if they have insurance. These people wait an indefinitely long period and may never get care they need, but actual numbers are simply unknown because they are not recorded in official statistics.

Opponents of the current reform care proposals fear that U.S. comparative effective research (a plan introduced in the stimulus bill) will be used to curtail spending and ration treatments, which is one function of the National Institute for Health and Care Excellence (NICE), arguing that rationing by market pricing rather by government is the best way for care to be rationed. However, when defining any group scheme, the same rules must apply to everyone in the scheme so some coverage rules had to be established. Britain has a national budget for public funded health care, and recognizes there has to be a logical trade off between spending on expensive treatments for some against, for example, caring for sick children. NICE is therefore applying the same market pricing principles to make the hard job of deciding between funding some treatments and not funding others on behalf of everyone in the insured pool. This rationing does not preclude choice of obtaining insurance coverage for excluded treatment as insured persons do having the choice to take out supplemental health insurance for drugs and treatments that the NHS does not cover (at least one private insurer offers such a plan) or from meeting treatment costs out-of-pocket.

The debate in the U.S. over rationing has enraged some in the UK and statements made by politicians such as Sarah Palin and Chuck Grassley resulted in a mass Internet protest on websites such as Twitter and Facebook under the banner title "welovetheNHS" with positive stories of NHS experiences to counter the negative ones being expressed by these politicians and others and by certain media outlets such as Investor's Business Daily and Fox News. In the UK, it is private health insurers that ration care (in the sense of not covering the most common services such as access to a primary care physician or excluding pre-existing conditions) rather than the NHS. Free access to a general practitioner is a core right in the NHS, but private insurers in the UK will not pay for payments to a private primary care physician. Private insurers exclude many of the most common services as well as many of the most expensive treatments, whereas the vast majority of these are not excluded from the NHS but are obtainable at no cost to the patient. According to the Association of British Insurers (ABI), a typical policy will exclude the following: going to a general practitioner; going to accident and emergency; drug abuse; HIV/AIDS; normal pregnancy; gender reassignment; mobility aids, such as wheelchairs; organ transplant; injuries arising from dangerous hobbies (often called hazardous pursuits); pre-existing conditions; dental services; outpatient drugs and dressings; deliberately self-inflicted injuries; infertility; cosmetic treatment; experimental or unproven treatment or drugs; and war risks. Chronic illnesses, such as diabetes and end stage renal disease requiring dialysis are also excluded from coverage. Insurers do not cover these because they feel they do not need to since the NHS already provides coverage and to provide the choice of a private provider would make the insurance prohibitively expensive. Thus in the UK there is cost shifting from the private sector to the public sector, which again is the opposite of the allegation of cost shifting in the U.S. from public providers such as Medicare and Medicaid to the private sector.

Palin had alleged that America will create rationing "death panels" to decide whether old people could live or die, again widely taken to be a reference to NICE. U.S. Senator Chuck Grassley alleged that he was told that Senator Edward Kennedy would have been refused the brain tumor treatment he was receiving in the United States had he instead lived a country with government run health care. This, he alleged, would have been due to rationing because of Kennedy's age (77 years) and the high cost of treatment. The UK Department of Health said that Grassley's claims were "just wrong" and reiterated health service in Britain provides health care on the basis of clinical need regardless of age or ability to pay. The chairman of the British Medical Association, Hamish Meldrum, said he was dismayed by the "jaw-droppingly untruthful attacks" made by American critics. The chief executive of the National Institute for Health and Clinical Excellence (NICE), told The Guardian newspaper that "it is neither true, nor is it anything you could extrapolate from anything we've ever recommended" that Kennedy would be denied treatment by the NHS. The business journal Investor's Business Daily claimed mathematician and astrophysicist Stephen Hawking, who had ALS and spoke with the aid of an American-accented voice synthesizer, would not have survived if he had been treated in the British National Health Service. Hawking was British and was treated throughout his life (67 years) by the NHS and issued a statement to the effect he owed his life to the quality of care he has received from the NHS.

Some argue that countries with national health care may use waiting lists as a form of rationing compared to countries that ration by price, such as the United States, according to several commentators and healthcare experts. The Washington Post columnist Ezra Klein compared 27% of Canadians reportedly waiting four months or more for elective surgery with 26% of Americans reporting that they did not fulfill a prescription due to cost (compared to only 6% of Canadians). Britain's former age-based policy that once prevented the use of kidney dialysis as treatment for older patients with renal problems, even to those who can privately afford the costs, has been cited as another example. A 1999 study in the Journal of Public Economics analyzed the British National Health Service and found that its waiting times function as an effective market disincentive, with a low elasticity of demand with respect to time.

Supporters of private price rationing over waiting time rationing, such as The Atlantic columnist Megan McArdle, argue time rationing leaves patients worse off since their time (measured as an opportunity cost) is worth much more than the price they would pay. Opponents also state categorizing patients based on factors such as social value to the community or age will not work in a heterogeneous society without a common ethical consensus such as the U.S. Doug Bandow of the CATO Institute wrote that government decision making would "override the differences in preferences and circumstances" for individuals and that it is a matter of personal liberty to be able to buy as much or as little care as one wants. Neither argument recognizes the fact that in most countries with socialized medicine, a parallel system of private health care allows people to pay extra to reduce their waiting time. The exception is that some provinces in Canada disallow the right to bypass queuing unless the matter is one in which the rights of the person under the constitution.

A 1999 article in the British Medical Journal, stated "there is much merit in using waiting lists as a rationing mechanism for elective health care if the waiting lists are managed efficiently and fairly". Arthur Kellermann, associate dean for health policy at Emory University, stated rationing by ability to pay rather than by anticipated medical benefits in the U.S. makes its system more unproductive, with poor people avoiding preventive care and eventually using expensive emergency treatment. Ethicist Daniel Callahan has written that U.S. culture overly emphasizes individual autonomy rather than communitarian morals and that stops beneficial rationing by social value, which benefits everyone.

Some argue that waiting lists result in great pain and suffering, but again evidence for this is unclear. In a recent survey of patients admitted to hospital in the UK from a waiting list or by planned appointment, only 10% reported they felt they should have been admitted sooner than they were. 72% reported the admission was as timely as they felt necessary. Medical facilities in the U.S. do not report waiting times in national statistics as is done in other countries and it is a myth to believe there is no waiting for care in the U.S. Some argue that wait times in the U.S. could actually be as long as or longer than in other countries with universal health care.

There is considerable argument about whether any of the health bills currently before congress will introduce rationing. Howard Dean for example contested in an interview that they do not. However, Politico has pointed out that all health systems contain elements of rationing (such as coverage rules) and the public health care plan will therefore implicitly involve some element of rationing.

=== Political interference and targeting ===
In the UK, where government employees or government-employed sub-contractors deliver most health care, political interference is quite hard to discern. Most supply-side decisions are in practice under the control of medical practitioners and of boards comprising the medical profession. There is some antipathy towards the target-setting by politicians in the UK. Even the NICE criteria for public funding of medical treatments were never set by politicians. Nevertheless, politicians have set targets, for instance to reduce waiting times and to improve choice. Academics have pointed out that the claims of success of the targeting are statistically flawed.

The veracity and significance of the claims of targeting interfering with clinical priorities are often hard to judge. For example, some UK ambulance crews have complained that hospitals would deliberately leave patients with ambulance crews to prevent an accident and emergency department (A&E, or emergency room) target-time for treatment from starting to run. The Department of Health vehemently denied the claim, because the A&E time begins when the ambulance arrives at the hospital and not after the handover. It defended the A&E target by pointing out that the percentage of people waiting four hours or more in A&E had dropped from just under 25% in 2004 to less than 2% in 2008. The original Observer article reported that in London, 14,700 ambulance turnarounds were longer than an hour and 332 were more than two hours when the target turnaround time is 15 minutes. However, in the context of the total number of emergency ambulance attendances by the London Ambulance Service each year (approximately 865,000), these represent just 1.6% and 0.03% of all ambulance calls. The proportion of these attributable to patients left with ambulance crews is not recorded. At least one junior doctor has complained that the four-hour A&E target is too high and leads to unwarranted actions that are not in the best interests of patients.

Political targeting of waiting-times in Britain has had dramatic effects. The National Health Service reports that the median admission wait-time for elective inpatient treatment (non-urgent hospital treatment) in England at the end of August 2007, was just under 6 weeks, and 87.5% of patients were admitted within 13 weeks. Reported waiting times in England also overstate the true waiting-time. This is because the clock starts ticking when the patient has been referred to a specialist by the GP and it only stops when the medical procedure is completed. The 18-week maximum waiting period target thus includes all the time taken for the patient to attend the first appointment with the specialist, time for any tests called for by the specialist to determine precisely the root of the patient's problem and the best way to treat it. It excludes time for any intervening steps deemed necessary prior to treatment, such as recovery from some other illness or the losing of excessive weight.

== See also ==
- Appeal to fear in defense of established economic interests
- Health care compared – tabular comparisons of the U.S., Canada, and other countries not shown above.
- Publicly funded health care
- Social medicine
- Socialization (economics)
- Universal health care

== Links ==
- Percentage of population covered under national health programs, selected countries, 1955 and 1970
- Contains information on health coverage in various countries in the 1980s
- Contains information on healthcare access in various European countries
- Contains information on healthcare coverage in various European countries
- Includes information about he healthcare systems of various countries in the 1970s
- Countries with social security programs in operation, January 1, 1955, by type of program and date of legislation
