= Operation Coffee Cup =

American Medical Association's campaign against proposed Medicare

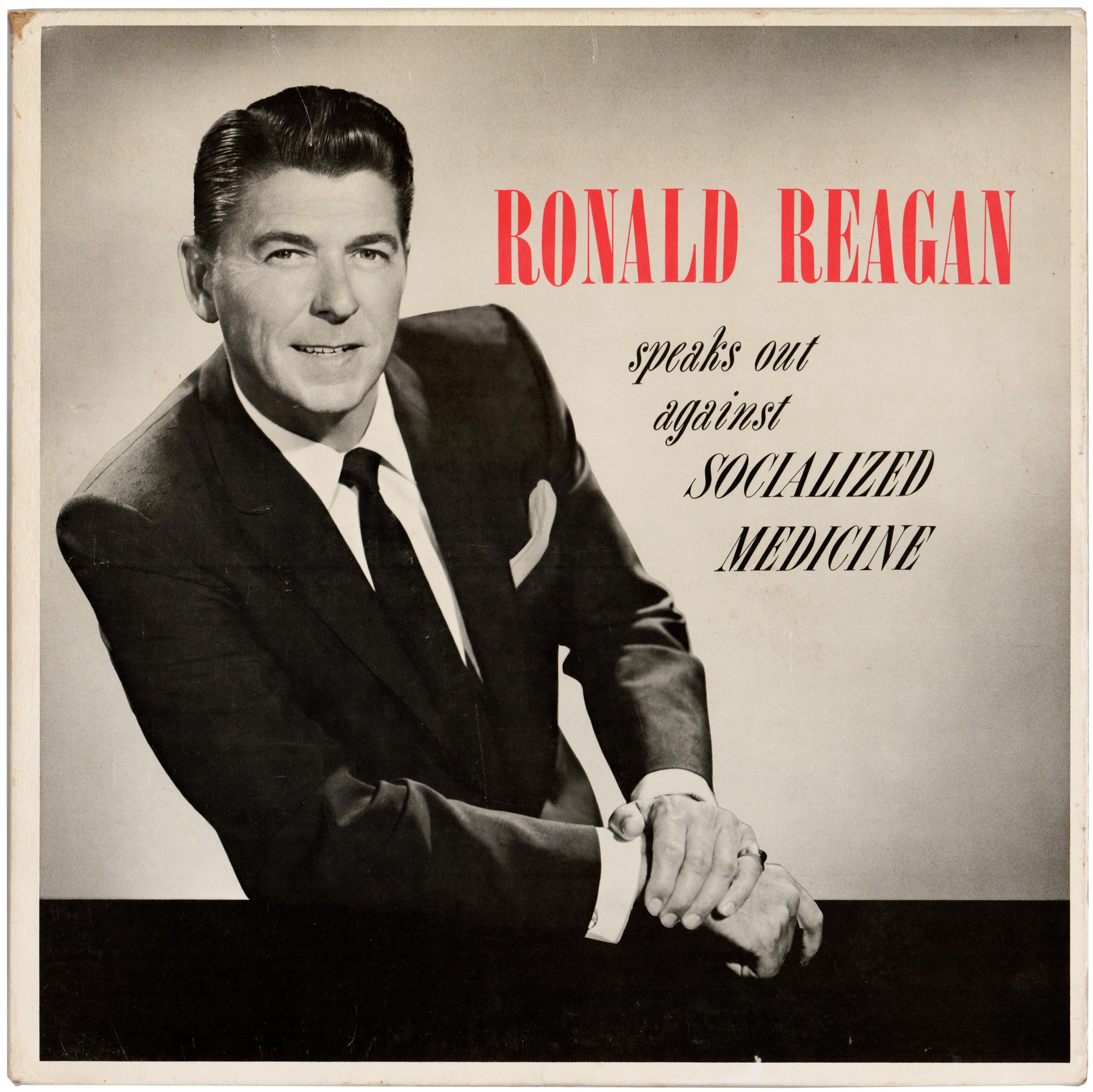
The cover of Ronald Reagan Speaks Out Against Socialized Medicine

Operation Coffee Cup was a campaign conducted by the American Medical Association (AMA) Women's Auxiliary in early 1961 in opposition to the Democrats' plans to extend Social Security to include health insurance for the elderly, later known as Medicare. As part of the plan, doctors' wives organized coffee meetings to try to convince acquaintances to write letters to Congress opposing the program. The operation received support from Ronald Reagan, who in 1961 produced the LP record Ronald Reagan Speaks Out Against Socialized Medicine for the AMA, outlining arguments against what he called socialized medicine. This record would be played at the coffee meetings.

== Background ==
The AMA had long opposed any government-run or subsidized provision of health care.

As John F. Kennedy took the presidency, one of his priorities was reforming the American healthcare system. He sent a health care bill to Congress, HR 4222, known as the King-Anderson legislation after its sponsors (Senator Clinton Anderson of New Mexico, and Rep. Cecil King of California). The bill expanded the government's role in caring for the elderly, including features of what would eventually become Medicare.
