= C. A. L. Reed =

American medical doctor (1856–1928)

Charles A.L. Reed
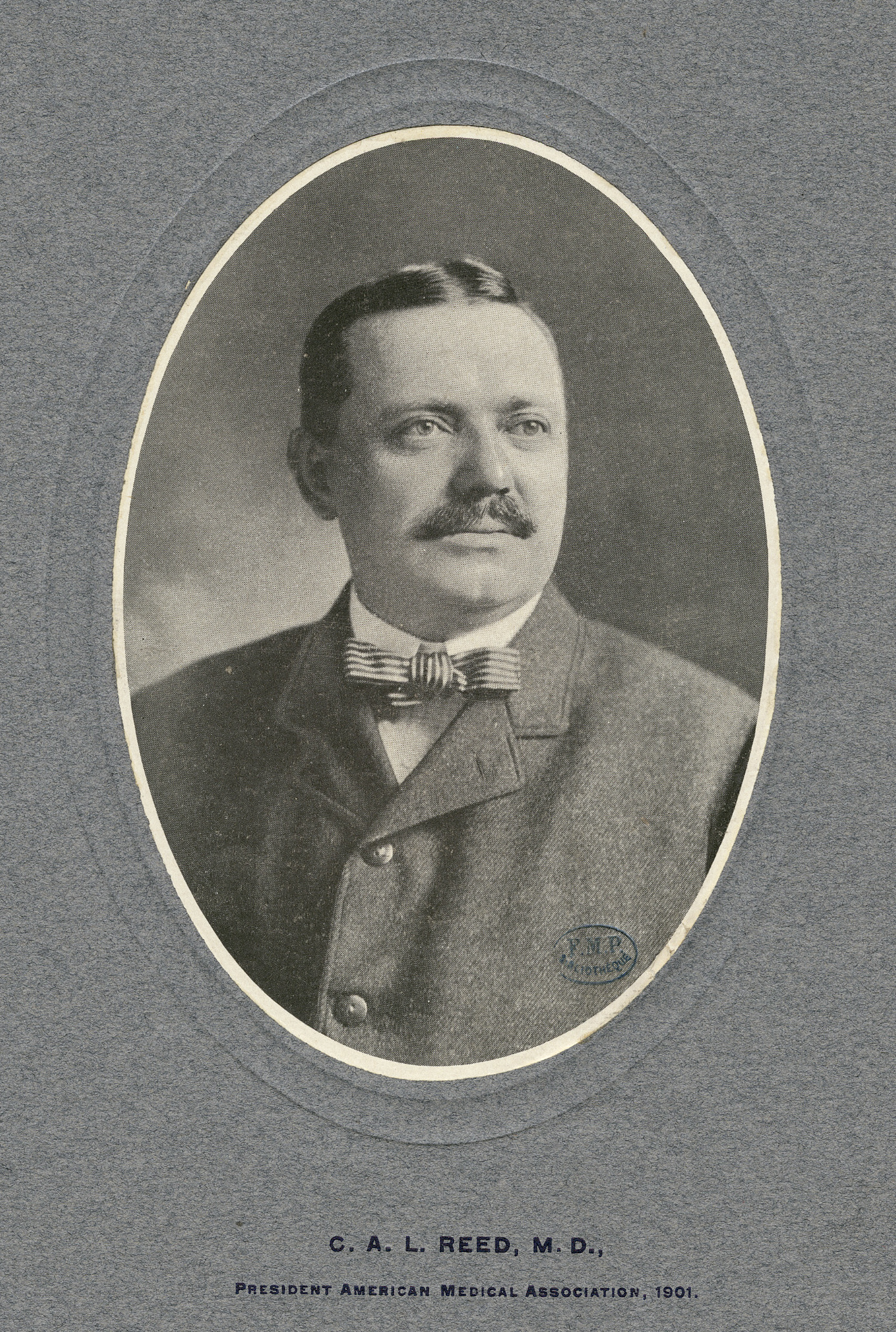
- Reed as president of the AMA, 1901.
- Born: 1856
- Died: 1928 (aged 71–72)
- Known for: President of the American Medical Association, 1901-1902
- Medical career
- Profession: Medical doctor

Charles A. L. Reed (1856-1928) was an American medical doctor. He served as president of the American Medical Association from 1901 to 1902.

== History ==
Charles Alfred L. Reed was born in Wolf Lake, Indiana, in 1856, the second son of Dr. Richard Cumming Stockton Reed and Nancy (Clark) Reed. He was educated in the schools of Ohio and held a Master of Arts from Miami University, Oxford. His medical education was received in the Cincinnati College of Medicine and Surgery, in which institution his father held the professorship of materia medica and therapeutics. Following graduation, he also studied in London and Paris. He practiced medicine in Cincinnati, specializing in surgery. He also practiced gynecology at several Cincinnati hospitals.

He was President of the Mississippi Valley Medical Association in 1892 and the Secretary-General of the first Pan-American Medical Congress in 1893. He later served as chairman of a committee on medical legislation within the AMA, circa 1905–1909. He was also a lecturer and promoter of public health initiatives and professor emeritus of the medical faculty at the University of Cincinnati.

Reed was a prolific author of monographs and journal articles.

He was an opponent of Prohibition.

He was married to the former Irene E. Dougherty. The couple had two children.

He died of a heart attack on August 28, 1928, at the age of 72.
