= Ronald Reagan Speaks Out Against Socialized Medicine =

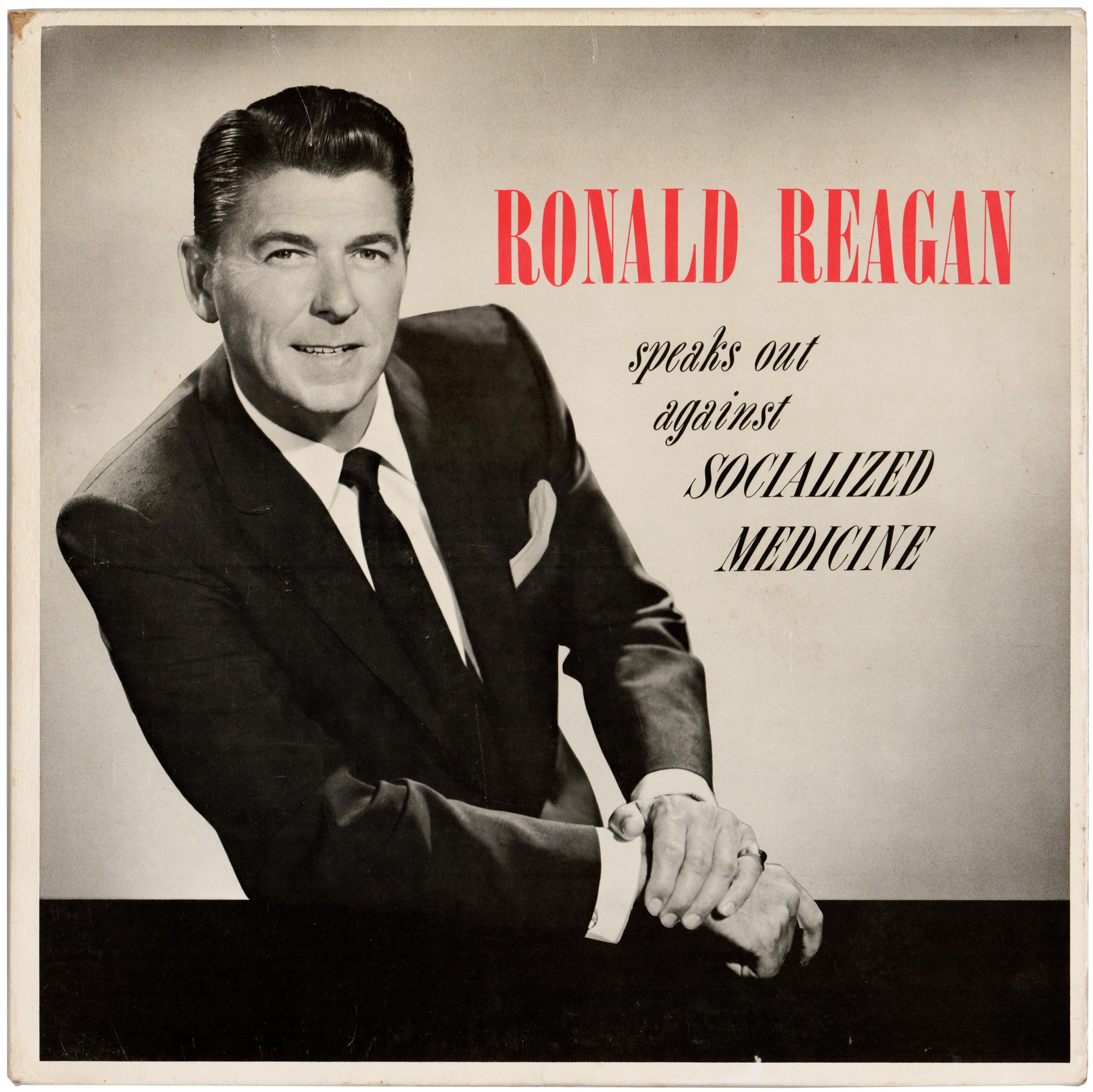

Live album (spoken word) by Ronald Reagan
- Released: 1961
- Genre: Spoken word
- Length: 10:06

Ronald Reagan Speaks Out Against Socialized Medicine is a 1961 LP featuring the actor and future U.S. president Ronald Reagan. In this ten-minute recording, Reagan "criticized Social Security for supplanting private savings and warned that subsidized medicine would curtail Americans' freedom" and that "pretty soon your son won't decide when he's in school, where he will go or what he will do for a living. He will wait for the government to tell him." Roger Lowenstein called the LP part of a "stealth program" conducted by the American Medical Association (see Operation Coffee Cup).

== Summary ==
Reagan opens by repeating an unsourced lie that in 1927 socialist Norman Thomas said that the American people would never vote for socialism but "under the name of liberalism the American people would adopt every fragment of the socialist program." Snopes.com calls this attribution probably false, arguing that "no one has ever been able to turn up a source".

Reagan says that "Government has invaded the free precincts of private citizens," stating that the U.S. government owns "1/5 of the total industrial capacity of the United States." Reagan says "One of the traditional methods of imposing statism or socialism on a people has been by way of medicine. It's very easy to disguise a medical program as a humanitarian project; most people are a little reluctant to oppose anything that suggests medical care for people who possibly can't afford it." Reagan cites the failure of President Harry S. Truman's national health insurance proposal as evidence of the American people's rejection of socialized medicine.

Reagan describes Representative Aime Forand as having introduced a bill which would institute "compulsory health insurance" for all people of social security age. Forand is quoted as having said, "If we can only break through and get our foot inside the door, then we can extend the program after that." Forand is likened to labor union leader Walter Reuther, who is quoted as having said, "It's no secret that the United Automobile Workers is officially on record of backing a program of national health insurance." The Forand bill is described as being praised by socialists: "They say once the Forand bill is passed this nation will be provided with a mechanism for socialized medicine capable of indefinite expansion in every direction until it includes the entire population. Now we can't say we haven't been warned."

Reagan describes Representative Cecil R. King of California as the successor to Congressman Forand in his support for a bill that would provide senior citizens with medical care; this bill was being championed by President John F. Kennedy at the time. (The 1962 King-Anderson bill is often described as a precursor to the Social Security Act of 1965, which established Medicare.) Reagan cites the expansion of private health insurance and the passage of the 1960 Kerr-Mills Act, which provided federal funds to states to cover the "medically needy," as evidence that King's legislation is unnecessary. Reagan concludes that the new bill is "simply an excuse to bring about what they wanted all the time: socialized medicine." Reagan warns against the danger of encroaching on the relationship between patients and doctors, and of an attack on doctors' freedoms.

Reagan encourages his listeners to join a letter-writing campaign to Congress with the message, "We do not want socialized medicine." Reagan quotes Representative Charles A. Halleck of Indiana as having said, "When the American people wants something from Congress, regardless of its political complexion, if they make their wants known, Congress does what the people want." Reagan warns that if his listeners do not stop the proposed medical program, "behind it will come other government programs that will invade every area of freedom as we have known it in this country until one day as Norman Thomas said we will wake to find that we have socialism." Under this scenario, Reagan says, "We are going to spend our sunset years telling our children and our children's children, what it once was like in America when men were free."

== Criticism ==
In 1966, Governor Pat Brown, campaigning for re-election against Reagan, said of Reagan's speech about socialized medicine, that Reagan was "an enemy of social progress," who had "hired" out to the American Medical Association. In response, Reagan accused him of "pure demagoguery" in suggesting that California's elderly had reason to fear a Reagan victory in the race for governor.

In 1980, President Jimmy Carter, campaigning for re-election against Reagan, told crowds that: "As a traveling salesman for the American Medical Association campaign against Medicare, [Reagan] sowed the fear that Medicare would mean socialism and that it would lead to the destruction of our freedom." When the subject arose in a televised debate in late October, Reagan responded: "When I opposed Medicare, there was another piece of legislation meeting the same problem before Congress. I happened to favor the other piece of legislation and thought it would be better for the senior citizens. ... I was not opposing the principle of providing care for them..." Carter's campaign accused Reagan of "rewriting history", saying that there was no such alternative legislation.
