= Patrice Harris =

American psychiatrist

Patrice A. Harris
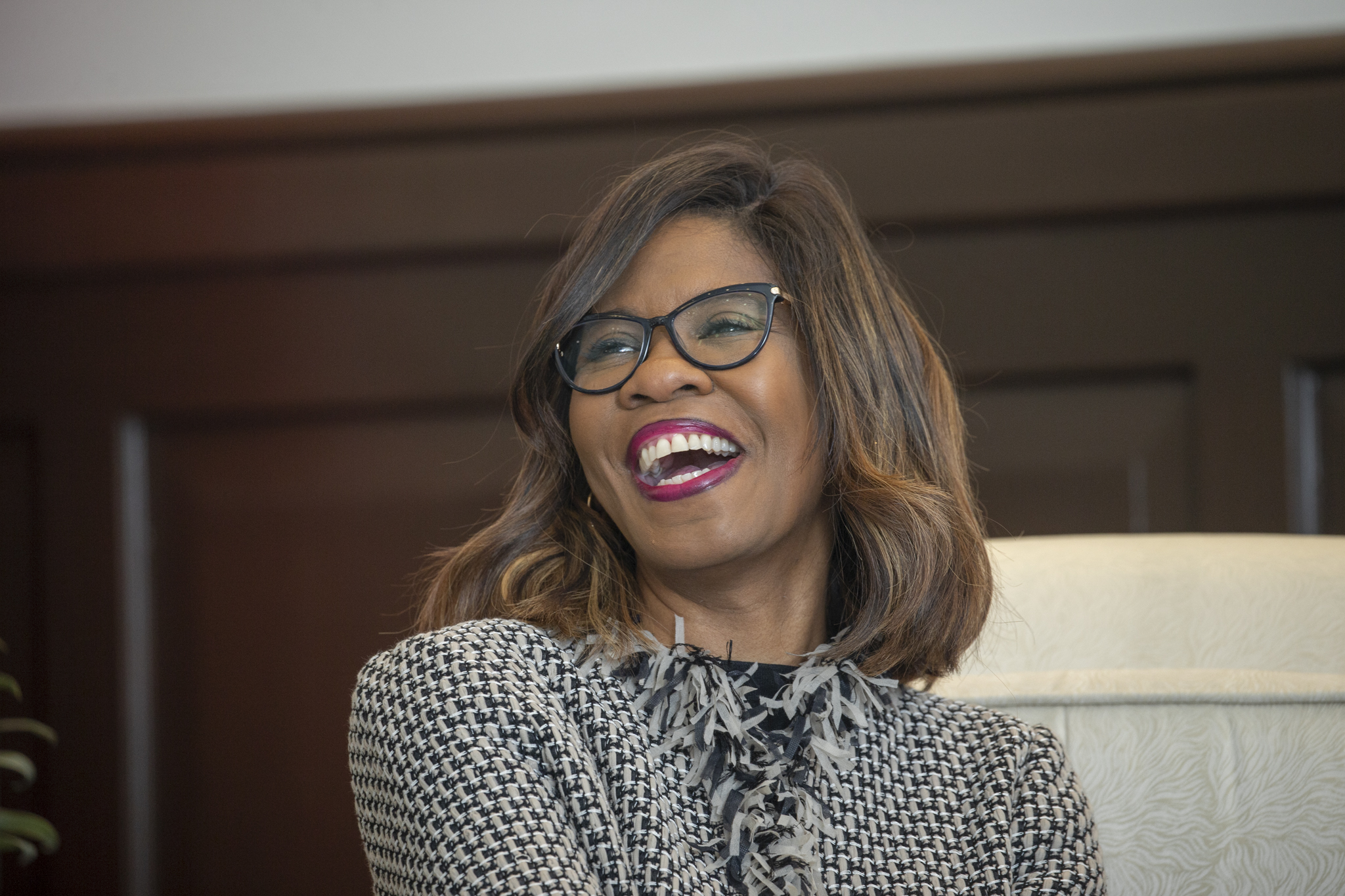
- Born: Bluefield, West Virginia
- Education: West Virginia University (BA, MA, MD)
- Occupation: Psychiatrist
- Organization(s): American Medical Association; American Psychiatric Association
- Known for: Elected the first African-American female president of the American Medical Association
- Website: Website

Patrice Harris is an American psychiatrist and the first African-American woman to be elected president of the American Medical Association. She was elected the 174th president in June 2019.

Harris is a native of West Virginia and received her Doctor of Medicine degree at West Virginia University. Her practice in psychiatry and public health has been in Atlanta, Georgia.

== Education and early career ==
Harris is a native of Bluefield, West Virginia. She received her Bachelor of Arts in Psychology from West Virginia University in 1982, and went on to receive her Master of Arts in Counseling Psychology and her medical degree from the university between 1982 and 1992. Following medical school, she moved to Atlanta to begin her residency in Child and Adolescent Psychiatry and Forensic Psychiatry at Emory University Hospital, where she remained for her fellowship.

== Medical career and service ==
Following her fellowship at Emory University Hospital, Harris launched her private practice in Adult, Child, Adolescent, and Forensic Psychiatry. In addition to her practice, Harris has used her expertise in public service and advocacy. She is also an adjunct professor at Emory University in the Department of Psychiatry and Behavioral Sciences.

From 2001 to 2003, Harris became a senior policy fellow and lobbyist for the Barton Child Law and Policy Clinic with funding from the Arthur M. Blank Family Foundation. There, she worked to strengthen the Clinic's capacity to act as a lead agency in protecting children from abuse and neglect with Child Protective Services. In 2005, she joined the Fulton County Department of Health Services, serving as the medical director of the Department of Behavioral Health and Developmental Disabilities, and from 2009 to 2015, she became the director of health services. In that role, she spearheaded efforts to integrate public health, behavioral health, and primary care services.

Harris has been an active member of the American Medical Association and has served in a number of leadership capacities. In June 2011, Harris was elected to the American Medical Association's board of trustees. In that capacity, she has been active on a number of task forces, including acting as chair of the AMA Opioid Task Force, which was launched in 2014 to identify best practices to combat the opioid epidemic. In addition to reducing the number of opioid prescriptions and taking advantage of state prescription drug monitoring programs, the task force has advocated for emphasizing treatment options, including making medication-assisted treatment more accessible and affordable. Harris has also chaired the AMA Council on Legislation and co-chaired the Women Physicians Congress. In 2018, she was elected as president of the AMA, making her the first African-American woman to serve in the role. Her time as president was marred by controversy surrounding the board's support of Tom Price's nomination for Secretary of Health and Human Services in 2016, causing backlash by group members and membership cancellations.

Harris has also served on the American Psychiatric Association's board of trustees and is a past president of the Georgia Psychiatric Physicians Association.

== Awards and honors ==
- Jeanne Spurlock, M.D. Minority Fellowship Achievement Award, American Psychiatric Association, 2018
- Presidential Commendation, American Academy of Pain Medicine, 2018
- Joseph P. Bailey Jr., M.D., Physician Distinguished Service Award, Medical Association of Georgia
- National Black Health Magazine Honoree, 2012
- Psychiatrist of the Year Award, Georgia Psychiatric Physicians Association, 2007
