= Nancy Dickey =

American physician

Nancy W Dickey
- Born: Nancy Wilson; September 10, 1950 (age 75); Clark, South Dakota
- Education: McGovern Medical School
- Occupation: Physician
- Known for: First female president of the American Medical Association; first female president of the Texas A&M Health Science Center

Nancy Dickey (born September 10, 1950) is an American physician. She was the first female president of the American Medical Association (AMA), serving in 1997–98. Previously she had served as chair of the board of trustees of the AMA and chaired its Council on Ethical and Judicial Affairs. For eleven years she was president of the Texas A&M Health Science Center, the first woman to hold that position.

== Biography ==
She was born in Clark, South Dakota on a family farm. Her parents were Ed and Mary Wilson. When she was 9 years old her family moved to Sacramento, California; five years later they moved to Katy, Texas, near Houston. She earned bachelor's degrees in psychology and sociology from Stephen F. Austin State University. A high school counselor had told her it was impossible to be a physician and have a family too, but her husband Frank said "go for it" and encouraged her to go to medical school. She earned her M.D. from McGovern Medical School at the University of Texas Health Science Center at Houston, where she also completed her residency training. She is board certified in Family practice; she estimates that she has delivered more than 4,000 babies in her private practice career. She was the founding director of the Family Practice Residency of the Brazos Valley.

In recent decades her focus has been on "health policy, health care delivery solutions, medical ethics, and professionalism." She developed the AMA's Patient Bill of Rights. She frequently speaks to professional and civic organizations and testifies before Congress on issues involving medical care in America.

In 1999 she was appointed a professor in the Department of Family and Community Medicine at the Texas A&M Health Science Center, and in 2002 she was named president and vice-chancellor for health affairs, a position she held until 2012. During her term as president, the Center added three campuses, grew from four to six colleges (adding a College of Pharmacy and a College of Nursing), and more than doubled enrollment from 880 students to more than 2000. Her resignation in October 2012 was prompted by the decision by the Texas A&M University System to transfer control of the Health Science Center to Texas A&M University. In 2013-2014 she was a Senior Scholar for the Association of Academic Health Centers.

In 2010 she was inducted into the Texas Women's Hall of Fame.

She is married with three children.

== See also ==
- Lillian H. South (first woman vice-president of American Medical Association)
