= Paul F. Eve =

American surgeon and Confederate veteran

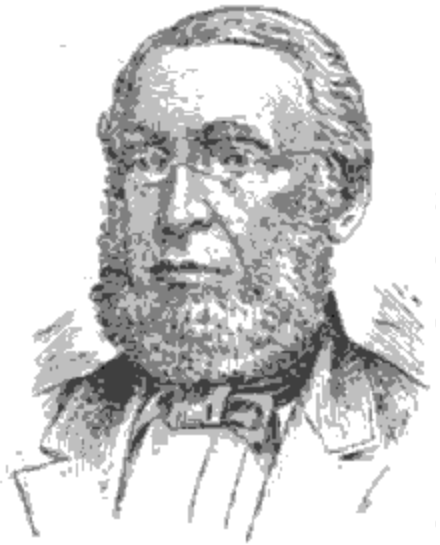
- Born: Paul Fitzsimmons Eve; June 27, 1806; Forest Hall, Richmond County, Georgia, U.S.
- Died: November 3, 1877 (aged 71); Nashville, Tennessee, U.S.
- Resting place: Augusta, Georgia, U.S.
- Education: Franklin College; University of Pennsylvania Medical School
- Occupation: Surgeon
- Parent(s): Oswell Eve; Aphra Ann Eve

Paul Fitzsimmons Eve (June 27, 1806 – November 3, 1877) was an American surgeon and Confederate veteran.

== Biography ==
Paul F. Eve was born in Richmond County, Georgia on June 27, 1806.

He graduated from Franklin College in 1826, and from the University of Pennsylvania Medical School in 1828. He participated in the Polish November Uprising against the Russians between 1830-1831, holding the rank of Major Field Surgeon.

He published over 600 articles in books and medical journals, and was the editor of the Southern Medical and Surgical Journal.

Eve died in Nashville on November 3, 1877.
