= American Medical Association =

American medical professional organization

- Formation: May 7, 1847; 179 years ago
- Type: Professional association
- Tax ID no.: 36-0727175
- Legal status: 501(c)(6)
- Headquarters: 330 North Wabash, Chicago, Illinois, United States
- Region served: United States
- Members: 271,660 as of 2022
- CEO: John Whyte
- President: Willie Underwood III
- Revenue: $493,147,829 (2022)
- Website: ama-assn.org

The American Medical Association (AMA) is an American professional association and lobbying group of physicians and medical students. This medical association was founded in 1847 and is headquartered in Chicago, Illinois. Membership was 271,660 in 2022.

The AMA's stated mission is "to promote the art and science of medicine and the betterment of public health". The organization was founded with the goal to raise the standards of medicine in the 19th century primarily through gaining control of education and licensing. In the 20th century, the AMA has frequently lobbied to restrict the supply of physicians, contributing to a doctor shortage in the United States. The organization has also lobbied against allowing physician assistants and other health care providers to perform basic forms of health care. The organization has historically lobbied against various forms of universal healthcare.

The Association also publishes the Journal of the American Medical Association (JAMA). The AMA also publishes a list of Physician Specialty Codes which are the standard method in the U.S. for identifying physician and practice specialties.

The American Medical Association is governed by a House of Delegates as well as a board of trustees in addition to executive management. The organization maintains the AMA Code of Medical Ethics, and the AMA Physician Masterfile containing data on United States Physicians. The Current Procedural Terminology coding system was first published in 1966 and is maintained by the Association. It has also published works such as the Guides to Evaluation of Permanent Impairment and established the American Medical Association Foundation and the American Medical Political Action Committee.

== History ==
=== 1847–1900 ===
In 1846, the organization created a committee dedicated to analyzing the methodology of vital records registration. It urged state governments to adopt measures to register births, marriages and deaths within their populations. In 1847, the American Medical Association was founded in Philadelphia by Nathan Smith Davis as a national professional medical organization. The organization educated people about the dangers of patent medicines and called for legislation regulating their production and sale. One resulting legislation was the Drug Importation Act of 1848.

In 1848, the AMA began publishing Transactions of the American Medical Association, which included lists and reports of cases of physiological effects of ether and chloroform at the Massachusetts General Hospital in Boston, the New York Hospital and the clinics of the University of Pennsylvania and Jefferson Medical College.

At the organization's second meeting in 1849, Thomas Wood suggested a committee on medical science to establish a board to analyze quack remedies and nostrums to be published in order to inform the public about the dangers of such remedies. The AMA's attempts to expose quack remedies aided the passage of the first Pure Food and Drug Act in 1906.

The AMA Committee on Ethics advocated for recognition of qualified female physicians in 1869, and the AMA inducted its first female member, Sarah Hackett Stevenson, as an Illinois State Medical Society delegate in 1876.

In 1872, the AMA's book Nomenclature of Diseases was published. In 1883, the AMA launched the Journal of the American Medical Association. The organization's founder, Nathan Smith Davis, served as the first editor of the publication.

In 1897, the AMA was incorporated in the state of Illinois.

AMA pushed for laws requiring compulsory smallpox vaccinations in 1899. In 1899, the AMA appointed a committee to report on tuberculosis, including on its communicability and prevention. The Committee on Tuberculosis presented its report in October 1900.

=== 1901–1920 ===
In 1901, the AMA was reorganized with its central authority shifted to a House of Delegates, a board of trustees, and executive offices. The House of Delegates was modeled after the United States House of Representatives and included representatives from medical organizations across the United States as a formal, reform-minded legislative body. The organization's new president appointed a Committee on Medical Education in order to evaluate medical education in the United States and make recommendations for its improvement.

The AMA's Committee on National Legislation established the Committee on Medical Legislation in 1901.

AMA created the Council on Pharmacy and Chemistry in 1905 to set standards for drug manufacturing and advertising. That same year, the AMA began a voluntary program of drug approval, which would remain in effect until 1955. Drug companies were required to show proof of the effectiveness of their drugs to advertise them in AMA's journal.

In 1906, the AMA established a Physician Masterfile designed to contain data on physicians in the United States as well as graduates of American medical schools and international graduates who are in the United States. Each file is established when an individual either enters medical schools or enters the United States.

The AMA established the Council for the Defense of Medical Research in 1908. AMA's Council on Medical Education and Hospitals first published its annual list of hospitals approved for internships in 1914.

=== 1921–1960 ===
In May 1922, the Woman's Auxiliary to the AMA was organized. The following year, the AMA established standards for medical specialty training residency programs. The AMA later published its first list of hospitals approved for residency training in 1927.

In 1927, Congress passed the Caustic Poison Act, lobbied for by the AMA, which required product labels to include warnings if they included lye or 10 other caustic chemicals.

In 1933, the AMA's general medical guide the Standard Classified Nomenclature of Disease, (referred to as the Standard), was released. Along with the New York Academy of Medicine, the APA provided the psychiatric nomenclature subsection. A number of revisions were produced, with the last in 1961.

The Normal Diet, a comprehensive listing of what Americans should be eating, was published by the AMA in 1938.

A formal partnership between the AMA and the Association of American Medical Colleges formed the Liaison Committee on Medical Education in 1942 in order to establish requirements for certification of medical schools. In 1951, the Joint Commission on Accreditation of Hospitals was created through merging the Hospital Standardization Program with quality standards from the American College of Physicians, the American Hospital Association, and the American Medical Association. The commission, established for evaluation and accreditation of healthcare organizations in the United States, governed by a board of commissioners including physicians, consumers and administrators.

The AMA publicly endorsed the principle of fluoridation of community water supplies in 1951.

In the 1940s, the AMA opposed President Harry S. Truman's proposal for a national health insurance program. Truman's plan called for a comprehensive federal health program that included expanded medical personnel, public health services, medical research, lower individual medical costs, and protection against loss of income from illness. The AMA criticized the proposal as "socialized medicine" and supported private, voluntary health insurance as an alternative.

=== 1961–1980 ===
In the early 1960s, the AMA opposed proposals to create Medicare, including the King-Anderson bill, which would have added hospital insurance for older Americans to Social Security. As part of this campaign, the AMA and its Woman's Auxiliary supported Operation Coffee Cup, a grassroots effort in which physicians' wives hosted coffee meetings, played Ronald Reagan's recorded address Ronald Reagan Speaks Out Against Socialized Medicine, and encouraged attendees to write members of Congress opposing the legislation. The AMA also promoted an alternative "Eldercare" plan rather than hospital insurance financed through Social Security.

The AMA first published the Current Procedural Terminology (CPT) coding system in 1966. The system was created for uniform reporting of outpatient physician services. The first manual was 163 pages and contained only four-digit codes with descriptions of each. A second edition of the book was published in 1970 with a fifth digit added.

The AMA published the first Guides to the Evaluation of Permanent Impairment in 1971. The guides were later republished in 1977 before the AMA Council on Scientific Affairs created 12 committees to review the guides before the second edition was published in 1984.

In the 1970s, the AMA spoke out against gender discrimination in medical institutions. In 1975, the AMA adopted a policy stating that "discrimination based on sexual orientation is improper and unacceptable by any part of the federation of medicine." It adopted a resolution to repeal all state sodomy laws. In 1976, the AMA began encouraging all public facilities to have handicap access.

=== 1981–2000 ===
The AMA released a survey in 1981 that found two short-term effects of dioxin on humans and recommended further studies. By 1983, the AMA accused the news media of conducting a "witch hunt" against the toxic chemical and launched a public information campaign to counter media hysteria.

In May 1983, the Journal of the American Medical Association published a report that reviewed cases of childhood AIDS.

A Federal district judge ruled that the AMA had violated the Sherman Antitrust Act in 1987 by depriving chiropractors of access to the Association. The lawsuit, filed by four chiropractors, accused AMA of conspiring to prevent chiropractors from practicing in the United States.

The Journal of the American Medical Association first documented that Joe Camel cartoons reached more children than adults in December 1991. The Association called for the R. J. Reynolds Tobacco Company to stop using the Joe Camel character in its advertising because of its appeal to youth.

In 1995, Lonnie R. Bristow became the first African-American president of the American Medical Association. Before he became president, Bristow was the first African-American member of the board of trustees and first African-American chairman of the board.

In 1996, the AMA campaigned against health plan "gag clauses", which prohibited doctors from discussing with their patients treatments not covered by the plan, stating that the stipulations inhibit the communication of information and restrict the care doctors can give their patients. The clauses were removed from the contracts of five leading providers, and laws prohibiting such clauses were passed in 16 states.

In 1997, the AMA established the National Patient Safety Foundation as an independent, nonprofit research and education organization focused on patient safety.

Nancy W. Dickey was named president of the American Medical Association in June 1998. She was the first woman to head the organization and had been part of AMA's leadership since 1977.

=== 2000–present ===
In 2002, the AMA released a report that found a medical liability insurance crisis in at least a dozen states was forcing physicians to either close practices or limit services. The association called for Congress to take action and campaigned for national reform.

In 2008, the AMA issued a formal apology for previous policies that excluded African-Americans from the organization and announced increased efforts to increase minority physician participation.

The AMA officially recognized obesity as a disease in 2013 in an attempt to change how the medical community approaches the issue.

In 2015, the AMA declared there is no medically valid reason to exclude transgender individuals from serving in the U.S. military. The Human Rights Campaign lauded the decision.

Patrice A. Harris became the AMA's 174th president serving from June 2019 to June 2020. She was the organization's first African-American woman to hold this position.

The AMA sponsors the Specialty Society Relative Value Scale Update Committee, which is an influential group of 29 physicians, mostly specialists, who help determine the value of different physicians' labor in Medicare prices.

== Policy positions ==
The AMA has one of the largest political lobbying budgets of any organization in the United States. Its political positions throughout its history have often been controversial.

=== Lobbying ===
Between 1998 and 2020, the association has spent an average of $18 million annually on lobbying efforts. In the first quarter of 2021, they reported $6.36 million in lobbying expenses.

Over the period 1/1/2022 to 12/31/2023, the AMA's political action committee donated a total sum of $1,095,900 to 244/535 (45.6%) voting members of the 118th Congress. 87% of that sum went to House members. Democrats received $654,400 (59.7%) while Republicans received $441,500 (40.3%).

=== Restrictions on physician supply ===
The AMA has at various points in history advocated for restricting the supply of physicians. In the early 20th century, the AMA lobbied lawmakers to shut down medical schools on grounds that they were substandard, which in turn reduced the supply of doctors. The AMA lobbied for reductions in physician supply during the Great Depression. In the 1930s and 1940s, the AMA pushed for citizenship requirements for doctors licenses as part of an effort to prevent Jewish doctors fleeing Nazi persecution in Europe from being able to practice medicine in the United States. In 1997, the AMA lobbied Congress to restrict the number of doctors that could be trained in the United States, claiming that, "The United States is on the verge of a serious oversupply of physicians." The AMA successfully lobbied Congress to cap how much Medicare could reimburse hospitals for resident physicians, which reduced residency training. In the decades following these restrictions on physician supply, the United States has a shortage of doctors. The United States was forecasted to have a shortage of 46,900 to 121,900 physicians by 2032. As a consequence of the restrictions on medical training in the United States, a quarter of physicians in the United States were trained abroad by 2022.

In the 1930s, the AMA attempted to prohibit its members from working for the health maintenance organizations established during the Great Depression, which violated the Sherman Antitrust Act and resulted in a conviction ultimately affirmed by the US Supreme Court.

In 1982, the Supreme Court of the United States upheld a Federal Trade Commission order that allowed doctors and dentists to advertise without professional association interference. The order restrained the AMA from its power to obstruct agreements between physicians and health maintenance organizations.

In the 1980s and 1990s, the AMA lobbied to restrict the number of foreign-trained doctors to the United States and to restrict the number of slots available to foreign-trained doctors to study in the United States.

The AMA has lobbied to restrict the ability of physician assistants to provide services with less oversight from doctors.

In 2007, the AMA called for state and federal agencies to investigate potential conflicts of interest between the retail clinics and pharmacy chains.

=== Opposition to expanded health care access ===
In 1917, the AMA endorsed compulsory health insurance, but the organization faced backlash from its state-level societies for this position. The AMA established a policy of opposition to compulsory health insurance by state or federal government in 1920.

A 1932 editorial in the Journal of the American Medical Society denounced a proposal for government-backed voluntary health insurance system.

Amid plans in post-WWII America to introduce compulsory health insurance, the AMA lobbied against it, spending more than $3.1 million on its lobbying campaign, including $1.1 million on advertising in 11,000 newspapers, 30 national magazines, and 1,000 radio stations. In the 1940s, the AMA opposed President Harry Truman's proposed healthcare reforms, which would have expanded healthcare facilities in low-income and rural communities, bolstered public health services, increased investments in medical research and education, and provided a payroll-tax-financed, government-run health insurance plan to help relieve the burden of excessive healthcare bills from sick persons. The AMA condemned Truman's plan as "socialized medicine". The AMA charged each of its members an extra 25 dollars to finance a lobbying campaign against the Truman plan. According to a 2026 study, which analyzed the AMA's campaign against national health insurance:

the AMA launched a nationwide campaign to weaken support for National Health Insurance by framing it as "socialized medicine," while simultaneously enrolling people in private health insurance plans to shift demand away from a public alternative... greater exposure to the campaign explains about 20% of the rise in private health insurance enrollment and a comparable decline in public support for a national program. The campaign also appears to have influenced policymaking through coordinated messaging, resolutions passed by civic organizations, congressional rhetoric, and political donations.

The AMA opposed Medicare, describing it as "the beginning of socialized medicine," although the AMA supported the creation of Medicaid. In 1961, the AMA opposed the King-Anderson bill proposing Medicare legislation and took out advertisements in newspapers, radio and television against government health insurance. The AMA established the American Medical Political Action Committee, which was separate from AMA though the Association nominated its board of directors. The AMA's efforts to defeat Medicare legislation was called Operation Coffee Cup. Actor and future president Ronald Reagan produced a spoken-word LP supporting the campaign, claiming that Medicare legislation would serve as a gateway to further government regulation of everyday life. The LP was a common fixture of Operation Coffee Cup meetings. The AMA created an "Eldercare" proposal rather than hospital insurance through Social Security. Since the enactment of Medicare, the AMA reversed its position and now opposes any "cut to Medicare funding or shift [of] increased costs to beneficiaries at the expense of the quality or accessibility of care".

The AMA did not take a position on Bill Clinton's proposed health care reform.

The AMA supported the Barack Obama administration's health care reform. In 2009, the American Medical Association released a public letter to the United States Congress and President Barack Obama endorsing his proposed overhaul to the public health care system, including universal health coverage. The following year, it offered "qualified support" for the Patient Protection and Affordable Care Act.

The AMA supported the Medicare Access and CHIP Reauthorization Act of 2015, which introduced Medicare reforms and replaced the SGR formula with increased Medicare physician reimbursement.

The AMA opposed Republicans' proposed repeal of the Affordable Care Act in March 2017, saying millions of Americans would lose health care coverage.

The AMA is opposed single-payer health care. At its 2019 House of Delegates meeting, the AMA voted to maintain its opposition to a single-payer system.

=== Substance use and addiction ===
The AMA's Committee on Alcoholism issued a statement in 1956 calling alcoholism an illness and encouraging medical personnel and institutions to admit and treat alcoholic patients.

In 1972, the AMA launched a "war on smoking" and supported legislation that would prohibit tobacco sample disbursement.

In the early 1980s, the AMA advocated for raising the national legal drinking age to 21.

The AMA called for a ban on advertising and promotion of all tobacco products in any form of media. The AMA also proposed declaring snuff and chewing tobacco a health hazard, increasing the tax on cigarettes, prohibiting smoking on public transportation and urged medical facilities to ban smoking on their premises.

In 2014, the Association created the AMA Opioid Task Force to evaluate prescription opioid use and abuse.

=== Medical malpractice reform ===
The AMA has supported changes in medical malpractice law to limit damage awards, which, it contends, makes it difficult for patients to find appropriate medical care. In many states, high risk specialists have moved to other states that have enacted reform. For example, in 2004, all neurosurgeons had relocated out of the entire southern half of Illinois. The main legislative emphasis in multiple states has been to effect caps on the amount that patients can receive for pain and suffering. These costs for pain and suffering are only those that exceed the actual costs of healthcare and lost income. At the same time however, states without caps also experienced similar results, suggesting that other market factors may have contributed to the decreases. Some economic studies have found that caps have historically had an uncertain effect on premium rates. A recent report by the AMA found that, in a 12-month period, five percent of physicians had claims filed against them.

=== Structural racism controversy and outcomes ===
During a February 2021 JAMA podcast, a Deputy Editor of the journal proposed that "structural racism is an unfortunate term to describe a very real problem," and that "taking racism out of the conversation would help" to ensure "all people who lived in disadvantaged circumstance have equal opportunities to become successful and have better qualities of life." In addition to the comments made during the podcast, JAMA then tweeted out the podcast with the caption "No physician is racist, so how can there be structural racism in health care" which further added to the controversy. The subsequent controversy led a Deputy Editor and the JAMA editor-in-chief Howard Bauchner to resign. Columnists Eric Zorn and Daniel Henninger asserted in separate Op-Eds that the resignation of the two editors was an unfortunate substitute for meaningful conversations about racism and health care, and the episode was highlighted as a case study of social media, polarization, and radicalization in Greg Lukianoff and Rikki Schlott's 2023 book The Canceling of the American Mind.

After the podcast structural racism controversy in 2021, the AMA published a paper that included recommendations to help improve health equity and address structural racism which would encourage "explicit conversations about power, racism, gender and class oppression, forms of discrimination and exclusion." Its "Advancing Health Equity: A Guide to Language, Narrative and Concepts" document asked "questions about language and commonly used phrases and terms, with the goal of cultivating awareness about dominant narratives and offering equity-based, equity-explicit, and person-first alternatives."

=== Position on LGBTQ rights ===
The AMA supports allowing transgender and intersex athletes to compete in sports that align with their gender identity and believes that attempts to ban trans and intersex athletes from sports is discrimination and hurts the mental and physical health of trans people. Additionally, the AMA opposes sports eligibility criteria that would force trans and intersex athletes to alter their hormones to participate in sports and opposes hormonal guidelines to determine gender classification for sports eligibility as well as physician participation in confirming an athlete's gender to determine eligibility.

The AMA also supports allowing trans people to use single-sex facilities that align with their gender identity and opposes attempts to ban trans people from single-sex facilities that align with their gender identity.

The AMA supports public and private health insurance coverage for gender-affirming care and opposes insurance exclusion on such care.

==== Position on gender-affirming care ====
In 2021, the AMA issued statements advocating strongly in favor of the use of puberty blockers for transgender youth, and against any legislation restricting such.

In 2023, members of the Endocrine Society submitted a resolution that advocated against legislation criminalizing access to gender-affirming healthcare and supported efforts to oppose discriminatory policies. This resolution led to the AMA's decision to strengthen its position on protecting gender-affirming care.

In 2025, the AMA rejected the Trump administration HHS gender dysphoria report, saying that its claims are "rooted in politics and partisanship, misrepresent the consensus of medical science, undermine the professionalism of physicians, and risk harming vulnerable young people and their families". The report was written in compliance with Executive Order 14187, which made it illegal for the federal government to advocate in favor of gender-affirming care under the age of 19. The report contradicted the consensus of the mainstream medical community, instead advocating for conversion therapy as the primary means of treatment for transgender youth.

On February 4, 2026, a day after the American Society of Plastic Surgeons (ASPS) heavily cited the Trump report to advocate against gender affirming surgeries under the age of 19, news outlets reported that the AMA had agreed with the ASPS. However, AMA's board released a statement claiming the media was misrepresenting what they had told them. The AMA board claimed that they never said they agreed with the ASPS statement nor had they changed their position on gender-affirming care. They said that they still support gender-affirming care as "medically necessary" and that their "recent response to questions about ASPS's position statement was intended to preserve—not diminish—access to gender-affirming care". Additionally, the AMA board said that they had sent letters to news outlets like the New York Times asking them to correct their stories which mischaracterized their statement.

On February 5, 2026, an AMA spokesperson reaffirmed the organization's support for puberty blockers for trans youth and said their position on puberty blockers had not changed, nor did they have any plans to change it.

The AMA continues to oppose restrictions on gender-affirming care for trans youth. On February 17, 2026, the AMA sent letters opposing two proposed CMS rules that would restrict doctors and hospitals from providing gender-affirming care to minors, saying the rules "interfere with the practice of medicine and undermine the physician-patient relationship" and requesting that the rules be withdrawn.

On February 23, 2026, 20 Republican state attorney generals, led by Alabama's Steve Marshall, sent a letter to the AMA threatening to investigate them under state consumer protection laws if they kept supporting puberty blockers and hormones for trans youth.

At their annual meeting in summer 2026, the AMA's House of Delegates passed a new policy formally and explicitly supporting gender-affirming surgeries for minors.

== Political donations ==
The association has donated between $1.6 million and $3.4 million in election cycles between 1990 and 2020. Their distributions have varied from near parity for both Democrats and Republicans to heavily favoring Republican candidates at 75% in the 1996 and 2004 elections.

Contributions by party of recipient (1990 to 2020)
Cycle	Total	Democrats	% to Dems	Republicans	% to Repubs
1990	$2,846,407	$1,398,543	49.13%	$1,447,864	50.87%
1992	$3,451,005	$1,696,551	49.23%	$1,749,454	50.77%
1994	$2,838,629	$1,206,192	42.57%	$1,627,437	57.43%
1996	$2,869,846	$695,525	24.23%	$2,174,571	75.77%
1998	$2,712,032	$804,018	29.84%	$1,890,514	70.16%
2000	$2,290,025	$1,081,268	47.27%	$1,206,007	52.73%
2002	$2,704,238	$1,074,695	39.74%	$1,629,543	60.26%
2004	$2,353,510	$564,375	24.24%	$1,763,950	75.76%
2006	$2,261,629	$743,554	33.05%	$1,506,410	66.95%
2008	$1,875,337	$1,044,987	55.74%	$829,700	44.26%
2010	$1,624,409	$867,750	53.46%	$755,409	46.54%
2012	$2,117,640	$880,062	41.66%	$1,232,578	58.34%
2014	$2,062,906	$793,776	38.51%	$1,267,640	61.49%
2016	$1,994,697	$739,187	37.12%	$1,252,093	62.88%
2018	$1,470,984	$715,539	49.13%	$740,805	50.87%
2020	$1,573,836	$830,438	54.14%	$703,513	45.86%

Between 1990 and 2020, the majority of contributions came from PAC money.

Contributions by source of funds (1990 to 2020)
Cycle	Individuals	PACs	Soft (Individuals)	Soft (Organization)
1990	$19,321	$2,827,086	N/A	N/A
1992	$31,425	$3,371,794	$0	$47,786
1994	$26,341	$2,742,156	$0	$70,132
1996	$46,633	$2,617,176	$0	$206,037
1998	$21,666	$2,609,991	$0	$80,375
2000	$41,056	$2,216,104	$350	$32,515
2002	$33,657	$2,656,131	$700	$13,750
2004	$81,800	$2,257,425	$35	$14,250
2006	$61,080	$2,188,884	$665	$11,000
2008	$124,869	$1,749,818	$0	$650
2010	$64,550	$1,538,859	$1,000	$20,000
2012	$70,062	$2,047,578	$0	$0
2014	$66,700	$1,985,716	$490	$10,000
2016	$101,903	$1,880,594	$2,200	$10,000
2018	$62,734	$1,400,190	$2,560	$5,500
2020	$171,963	$1,362,650	$4,223	$35,000

== Criticism ==
During the Civil Rights Movement, the American Medical Association's policy of allowing its constituent groups to be racially segregated in areas with widespread prejudice faced opposition from doctors as well as other healthcare professionals. Pressure from organizations such as the Medical Committee for Human Rights (MCHR) resulted in changed policies by the late 1960s.

Nobel Memorial Prize-winning economist Milton Friedman, as well as his wife, Rose Friedman, have claimed that the organization acts as a guild and has attempted to increase physicians' wages and fees by influencing limitations on the supply of physicians and competition from non-physicians. In the book Free to Choose, the Friedmans stated that "the AMA has engaged in extensive litigation charging chiropractors and osteopathic physicians with the unlicensed practice of medicine, in an attempt to restrict them to as narrow an area as possible." The AMA was also criticized for holding up licensing of foreign-trained medical professionals who, after Adolf Hitler came to power, were fleeing to the U.S. from Nazi-controlled Germany and adjacent nations. Profession and Monopoly also criticized the AMA for limiting the supply of physicians and inflating the cost of medical care in the U.S. as well as its influence on hospital regulation. In a 1987 antitrust court case, a federal district judge called the AMA's behavior toward chiropractors "systematic, long-term wrongdoing". The AMA was accused of limiting the associations between physicians and chiropractors. In the 1960s and 1970s, the association's Committee on Quackery was said to have targeted the chiropractic profession, and for many years the AMA held that it was unethical for physicians to refer patients to chiropractors or to receive referrals from chiropractors.

In October 2020, the association used Twitter and Facebook to publicly oppose scope of practice creep, where non-physicians are permitted to provide healthcare services without physician oversight. The posts were removed the same day and the AMA commented that they were committed to "team-based healthcare guided by a physician" to "optimize patient outcomes." The American Academy of Physician Assistants published a letter expressing their frustration at the social media posts. Rebekah Bernard from the advocacy group Physicians for Patient Protection publicly criticized the AMA for retracting their social media posts.

In 2024 and 2025 the AMA came under criticism for relative silence on US government interference in medical practice, such as the criminalization of abortion in many states, the de-funding and banning of many medical research studies and the promotion of anti-vaccination beliefs. The independent editors of JAMA, published by the AMA, condemned government over-reach into medical publishing and the de-funding of medical research. By comparison, the leadership of the AMA was notably absent in lobbying against or even publicly criticizing the actions of the Trump administration which affected medicine in early 2025.

== Structure ==
The AMA is composed of policy discussion groups that meet twice a year for an annual meeting and an Interim meeting. Within the AMA, there are sections that include Medical Students, Resident and Fellows, Academic physicians, Medical School Deans and Faculty, Physicians in group practice setting, Retired and Senior Physicians, International Medical graduates, Woman physicians, Physician Diversity and Minority health, GLBT, USAN, AMA board of Trustees, Foundation and Council. External organizations, called AMA member organizations, come to these meetings by sending representatives. Representatives come from a state, specialty or the federal services/government service medical societies.

== See also ==
- AMA Foundation Leadership Award
- AMA Manual of Style
- AMA Scientific Achievement Award
- American Association of Physicians and Surgeons
- American Dental Association
- American Medical Student Association
- American Osteopathic Association
- ChangeMedEd
- George H. Simmons
- JAMA Pediatrics
- List of journals published by the American Medical Association
- National Physicians Alliance
- Physicians for a National Health Program
- C. A. L. Reed
- African American student access to medical schools
