= 5th Michigan Territorial Council =

Legislature in Michigan Territory (1832–1833)

←	4th Michigan Territorial Council	6th Michigan Territorial Council	→
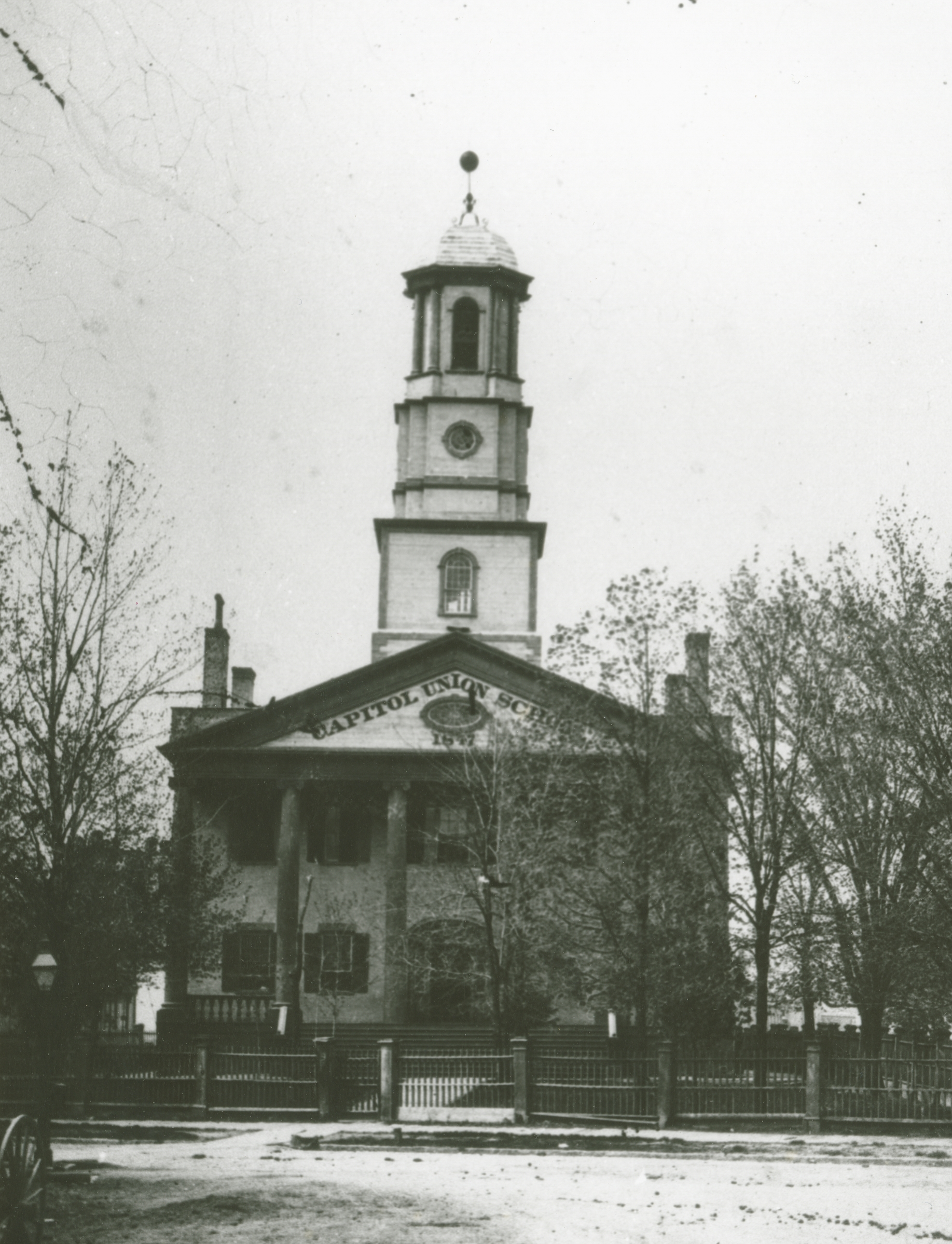
- The Territorial Courthouse in Detroit, later the State Capitol and then a school

Overview
- Legislative body: Michigan Territorial Council
- Jurisdiction: Michigan Territory, United States
- Meeting place: Territorial Courthouse, Detroit
- Term: May 1, 1832 – April 23, 1833

Michigan Territorial Council
- Members: 13 members
- President: John McDonell

Sessions
- 1st: May 1, 1832 – June 29, 1832
- 2nd: January 1, 1833 – April 23, 1833

Districts of the Fifth Territorial Council

The Fifth Michigan Territorial Council was a meeting of the legislative body governing Michigan Territory, known formally as the Legislative Council of the Territory of Michigan. The council met in Detroit in two regular sessions between May 1, 1832, and April 23, 1833, during the term of George B. Porter as territorial governor.

== Leadership and organization ==
John McDonell was president of the council, Edmund A. Brush secretary, and James T. Allen sergeant-at-arms.

== Members ==
A January 1827 act of the United States Congress provided for the direct election of a 13-member legislative council by the people of the territory; the same act gave the council responsibility for determining the apportionment of seats. The council apportioned the seats as follows in an 1831 act:

... the county of Wayne shall form the first electoral district, and shall be entitled to elect three members ... the counties of Macomb and St. Clair shall compose the second district, and shall be entitled to elect one member ... the county of Oakland, and the country attached thereto, shall compose the third district, and shall be entitled to elect two members ... the county of Washtenaw, and the country attached thereto, shall compose the fourth district, and shall be entitled to elect two members ... the counties of Monroe and Lenawe, and the country attached to Lenawe, shall compose the fifth district, and shall be entitled to elect two members ... the counties of Cass, St. Joseph and Kalamazoo, and the country attached thereto, shall compose the sixth district, and be entitled to elect one member ... the counties of Chippewa, Michilimackinac, Brown, Crawford and Iowa shall compose the seventh district, and shall be entitled to elect two members of the legislative council.

Members
District	County	Name	Party	Notes
1	Wayne	John McDonell	Democratic	
1	Wayne	Charles Moran	Democratic	
1	Wayne	Joseph Torrey	Democratic	
2	Macomb St. Clair	Alfred Ashley		
3	Oakland	Charles C. Hascall	Democratic	
3	Oakland	Roger Sprague		
4	Washtenaw	James Kingsley	Democratic	
4	Washtenaw	George Renwick	Whig	
5	Lenawee Monroe	Daniel S. Bacon	Democratic	
5	Lenawee Monroe	Laurent Durocher	Democratic	
6	Cass Kalamazoo St. Joseph	Calvin Britain	Democratic	
7	Brown Chippewa Crawford Iowa Michilimackinac	Henry Dodge	Democratic	Did not appear at either session.
7	Brown Chippewa Crawford Iowa Michilimackinac	Morgan L. Martin	Democratic	
