= 6th Michigan Territorial Council =

Legislature in Michigan Territory (1834–1835)

←
5th Michigan Territorial Council
- 1st Michigan Legislature
- 7th Michigan Territorial Council
→
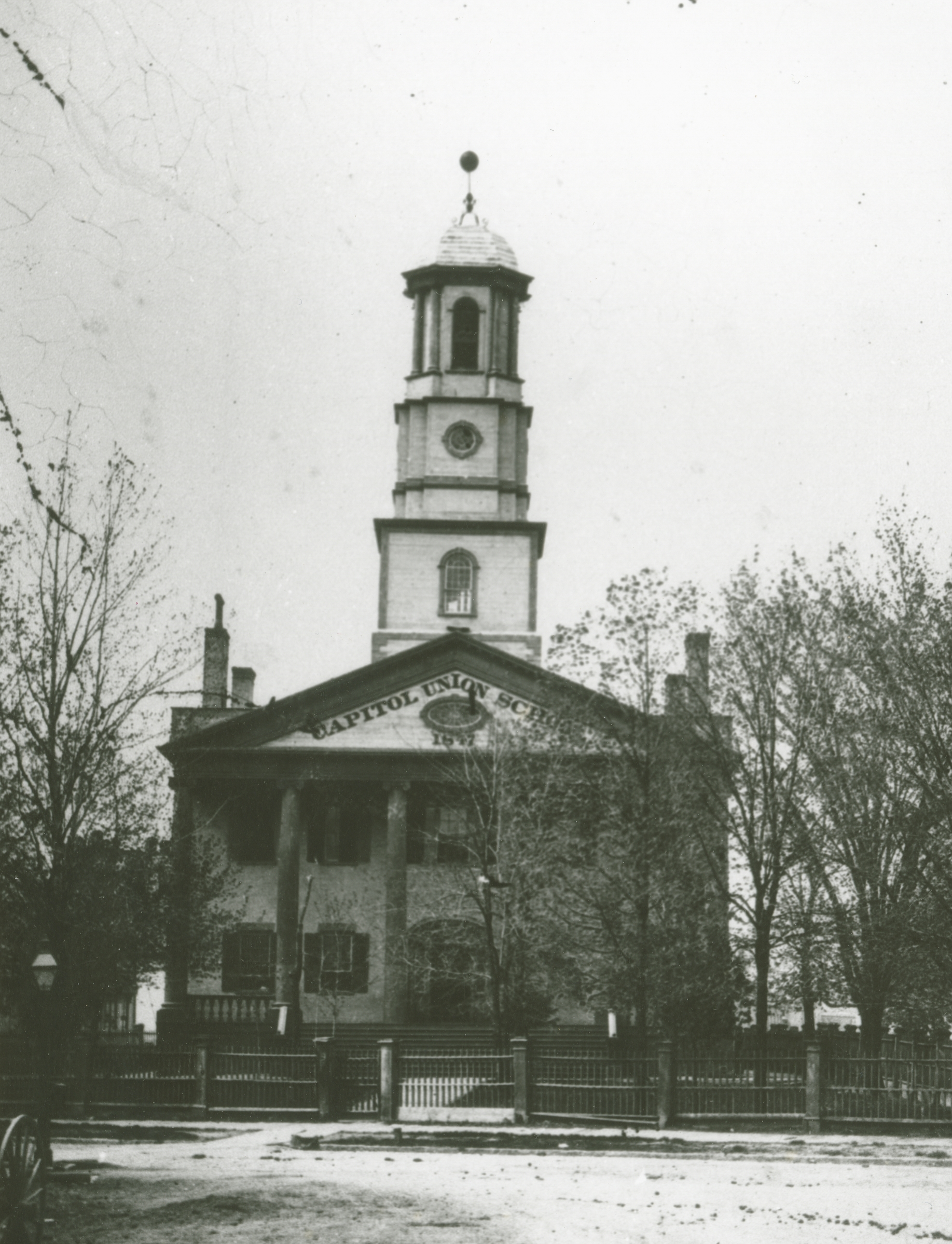
- The Territorial Courthouse in Detroit, later the State Capitol and then a school

Overview
- Legislative body: Michigan Territorial Council
- Jurisdiction: Michigan Territory, United States
- Meeting place: Territorial Courthouse, Detroit
- Term: January 7, 1834 – August 25, 1835

Michigan Territorial Council
- Members: 13 members
- President: John McDonell (1st session); Morgan L. Martin (2nd session)

Sessions
- 1st: January 7, 1834 – March 7, 1834
- Extra: September 1, 1834 – September 8, 1834
- November 11, 1834 – December 31, 1834
- 2nd: January 12, 1835 – March 28, 1835
- Special: August 17, 1835 – August 25, 1835

Districts of the Sixth Territorial Council

The Sixth Michigan Territorial Council was a meeting of the legislative body governing Michigan Territory, known formally as the Legislative Council of the Territory of Michigan. The council met in Detroit in two regular sessions, one extra session, and one special session between January 7, 1834, and August 25, 1835, during the terms of George B. Porter and Stevens T. Mason as territorial governors.

In addition to the regular business of governing the territory, during these sessions the council dealt with a number of matters related to Michigan's desire for statehood, including petitioning both the United States Congress and President Andrew Jackson for action on the matter, organizing a census of the territory, trying to find a resolution of the ongoing dispute with Ohio known as the Toledo War, and calling a state constitutional convention in order to force Congress to act.

This was the final meeting of the territorial council in its role as the legislative body for all of Michigan Territory. The people of the portion of the territory east of Lake Michigan ratified a state constitution in 1835 that created a new Michigan Legislature, elections for which were held that same year. A 7th Michigan Territorial Council, also known as the Rump Council, was convened in 1836, but was composed of members only from that portion of the territory not governed by the new constitution, which later became the Wisconsin Territory.

== Sessions ==
The council met in two regular sessions, one in 1834 and one in 1835. An extra session was held in late 1834, and a special session in August 1835.

=== First regular session ===
The first session convened at Detroit on January 7, 1834. The length of the session was limited by law to sixty days, but the pending application for statehood for Michigan before the United States Congress—and its anticipated failure—prompted the council on March 7, the final day of the session, to request that Congress authorize an extra thirty-day session, callable by the territorial governor, for the purpose of arranging a census of the territory. Congress approved the request on June 30.

=== Extra session ===
Territorial Governor George B. Porter died during a cholera epidemic in July, leaving Acting Governor Stevens T. Mason to call the extra session, which convened in Detroit on September 1, 1834. In his message to the council, Mason reiterated the purpose of conducting a census to ascertain that the territory had more than the 60,000 inhabitants necessary to qualify for statehood under the terms of the Northwest Ordinance. Anticipating a constitutional convention, he wrote, "The State of Michigan will then have a right to demand admission into the Union; and it is not to be anticipated, that the Congress of the United States will hesitate to yield as a matter of right, what they have heretofore refused to grant to us as a favor." Mason also asked the council to end the practice of imprisoning debtors, and to organize counties and courts in land newly attached to Michigan Territory—the area of present-day Iowa and Minnesota.

In this session, the council extended the territorial laws to the newly-acquired lands and created Milwaukee County in the area of present-day Wisconsin. The council also called for a census of the lands both east and west of Lake Michigan to be conducted the following month, to be completed by November 2, and issued a resolution calling for statehood if the census showed a population above the 60,000 threshold. The council adjourned on September 8, 1834, until November 11, after the census was due to be completed.

The extra session resumed on November 12, a day late due to a lack of quorum the day before. Mason reported to the council that the census showed 85,856 inhabitants, and exhorted them to authorize the election of delegates to a state constitutional convention. The council authorized all "free white inhabitants" of the territory to vote for delegates in April 1835, and reiterated Michigan's claim to the strip of land at dispute in the Toledo War with Ohio.

On December 26, the council passed an act providing for the appointment of three commissioners to negotiate and settle all disputes with Ohio. The extra session was adjourned on December 31. The second regular session was set to begin the following day, January 1, 1835, but the council immediately adjourned until January 12.

=== Second regular session ===
The second regular session convened in Detroit on January 12, 1835. The council wrote a lengthy petition to President Andrew Jackson imploring him to intervene to stop Ohio's pending claim of the disputed strip of land, saying, "What! Because the state of Ohio contains a million of inhabitants, and this territory but one hundred thousand, are our rights less sacred than hers? Or is justice in this free country to be measured by the number or strength of the parties?"

In February, Ohio Governor Robert Lucas rejected the idea of negotiating with the commissioners, saying the council had no authority to negotiate and any agreement would not be binding on Michigan as a state. In addition, he asked the Ohio Legislature to declare that "all counties bordering on the northern boundary of the state of Ohio shall extend to and be bounded on the north by the line running from the southern extremity of Lake Michigan to the most northern cape of Maumee bay", and direct local authorities to begin exercising jurisdiction in these areas, and the legislature complied. The Michigan Territorial Council, in response, passed on act on February 12 punishing by heavy fines or imprisonment any person who would "exercise or attempt to exercise any official functions" within the territory without authority from either the territory or the United States. Militias from Ohio and Michigan, under command of their respective governors, faced off across the Maumee River.

Anticipating the upcoming constitutional convention, the council authorized the territorial governor to apportion seats on the council among the remaining counties not covered by the constitution.

=== Special session ===
President Jackson dispatched a pair of commissioners to the Maumee River to meet with both governors, and they proposed a compromise which effectively gave Ohio what it wanted. Mason opposed the compromise, and called the council into special session on August 17, 1835, to consider it. The council unanimously rejected the proposed compromise on August 20. The state constitutional convention had met in the meantime, and its own resolution called for the territory not to interfere with re-marking the previously-surveyed "Harris line" that Ohio preferred, as long as Ohio did not exercise any jurisdiction over the disputed territory in the meantime. Ohio agreed, and the Toledo War effectively ended.

The council adjourned on August 25, 1835. That same day, Mason issued a proclamation apportioning membership on the council among the territory's remaining counties, and called for the newly-constituted council to meet in Green Bay on January 1, 1836; this would be the 7th council, which became known as the Rump Council.

== Leadership and organization ==
After adoption of the standing rules for the session on January 13, 1834, John McDonell was elected president, John Norvell secretary, Seneca Allen recording clerk, Theodore Williams enrolling clerk, Elisha L. Atkins sergeant-at-arms, Harvey Chubb doorkeeper, and Solomon J. Matthews and Pitt Phillips messenger and assistant messenger, respectively.

At the second regular session, Morgan Lewis Martin was elected president, and Charles W. Whipple secretary.

== Members ==
A January 1827 act of the United States Congress provided for the direct election of a 13-member legislative council by the people of the territory; the same act gave the council responsibility for determining the apportionment of seats. The council apportioned the seats as follows in an 1831 act, which was re-affirmed in 1833:

... the county of Wayne shall form the first electoral district, and shall be entitled to elect three members ... the counties of Macomb and St. Clair shall compose the second district, and shall be entitled to elect one member ... the county of Oakland, and the country attached thereto, shall compose the third district, and shall be entitled to elect two members ... the county of Washtenaw, and the country attached thereto, shall compose the fourth district, and shall be entitled to elect two members ... the counties of Monroe and Lenawe, and the country attached to Lenawe, shall compose the fifth district, and shall be entitled to elect two members ... the counties of Cass, St. Joseph and Kalamazoo, and the country attached thereto, shall compose the sixth district, and be entitled to elect one member ... the counties of Chippewa, Michilimackinac, Brown, Crawford and Iowa shall compose the seventh district, and shall be entitled to elect two members of the legislative council.

Members
District	County	Name	Party
1	Wayne	Farnsworth, Elon	Democratic
1	Wayne	McDonell, John	Democratic
1	Wayne	Moran, Charles	Democratic
2	Macomb St. Clair	Stockton, John	Democratic
3	Oakland	Hascall, Charles C.	Democratic
3	Oakland	Satterlee, Samuel	
4	Washtenaw	Millington, Abel	
4	Washtenaw	Renwick, George	Whig
5	Lenawee Monroe	Bacon, Daniel S.	Democratic
5	Lenawee Monroe	Durocher, Laurent	Democratic
6	Cass Kalamazoo St. Joseph	Britain, Calvin	Democratic
7	Brown Chippewa Crawford Iowa Michilimackinac	Doty, James D.	Democratic
7	Brown Chippewa Crawford Iowa Michilimackinac	Martin, Morgan L.	Democratic
