= 1818 Michigan Territory general assembly referendum =

- February 16, 1818

The 1818 Michigan Territory general assembly referendum was held in the Territory of Michigan to determine whether a majority of the territory's freeholders favored the creation of a general legislative assembly to replace the system of governors and judges in effect at the time, as provided for by the Northwest Ordinance. The election was called by Territorial Governor Lewis Cass, and results showed a majority opposed changing the system of government.

== Background ==
The Northwest Ordinance outlined three stages of government for the Northwest Territory. The first stage consisted of a governor, a secretary, and three judges; the governor and judges together formed the legislative branch of government. The second stage called for a general assembly comprising the territorial governor, an elected house of representatives, and a five-person legislative council; this stage was to be instituted when the territory contained 5000 "free male inhabitants of full age" and "satisfactory evidence [had been] given to the Governor thereof, that such is the wish of a majority of the freeholders". The third stage was full statehood. The Northwest Territory reached the second stage in 1798. When the Territory of Indiana was split from it in 1800, the new territory reverted to the first stage, but advanced again to the second stage in 1804. Michigan Territory reverted again to the first stage when it was created from part of Indiana Territory in 1805, and the governor and judges still constituted its legislative branch in 1818.

Nominally, the governor and judges formed a four-person legislative body. In practice, Judge Augustus Woodward wielded much of the power, since another of the judges, John Griffin, almost always deferred to him, so Woodward could do no worse than tie in most legislative matters and needed only one additional ally for a majority. Some residents and fellow officials found Woodward pompous and pedantic, but others, especially the French and British settlers, appreciated him as a counterbalance to the influence of newer settlers from the east coast. Governor Cass believed that advancing to the second stage would both move Michigan Territory closer to statehood and help reduce Woodward's influence, since he would remain a judge but no longer control the legislative process.

== Election ==
Governor Cass issued a proclamation on January 5, 1818, calling for a vote to determine whether a majority of freeholders supported creating a general assembly. He cited his authority under the Northwest Ordinance and the successive acts of Congress that created Michigan Territory, as well as petitions signed by 145 residents asking him to take the step. For most of the territory, Cass set the election date as February 16, 1818. For the district of Michilimackinac, then part of Wayne County, the justices of the peace were to choose a date.

The proposal to move to the general assembly form of government failed. The primary argument against it involved cost. While the governor and judges were paid for by the federal government, the territory would have been responsible for the cost of the new government.

Dissatisfaction with the system of government continued to grow after the failed referendum, and in 1822 hundreds of citizens petitioned Congress for a change. In 1823, Congress authorized the creation of the Michigan Territorial Council.
