= Witherell =

Witherell is a surname, and may refer to:

- Benjamin F. H. Witherell (1797-1867) American jurist in Michigan
- James Witherell (1759-1838), American politician and jurist in Vermont and Michigan
- Elizabeth Witherell, editor-in-chief of The Writings of Henry D. Thoreau
- Michael S. Witherell (born 1949), physicist, director of Lawrence Berkeley National Laboratory and formerly director of Fermilab.

== See also ==
- Justice Witherell (disambiguation)
