= Abel Millington =

American politician and physician

Member of the Michigan Territorial Council from the 4th district
- In office January 7, 1834 – August 25, 1835 Serving with George Renwick

Personal details
- Born: February 5, 1787 Rutland, Vermont
- Died: 1838 (aged 50–51) St. Charles, Illinois

Abel Millington (February 5, 1787 – 1838) was a Michigan politician and medical doctor.

== Early life ==
Millington was born on February 5, 1787, in Rutland, Vermont. In 1826, Millington moved to Ypsilanti Township, Michigan Territory.

== Career ==
Millington was a medical doctor. In either 1825 or 1826, Harvey H. Snow transferred his ownership of Snow's Landing (now known as Rawsonville) to Millington. In 1826, Millington built a sawmill there. In 1827, Millington was unanimously elected the first supervisor of Ypsilanti Township, receiving 59 votes. The same year, Millington unsuccessfully ran for a seat in the Michigan Territorial Council, receiving 74 votes. In 1832, Millington was elect among the first trustees of the village of Ypsilanti. In 1833, Millington was elected as a member of the member of the Michigan Territorial Council from 4th district, receiving 537 votes. He served in this position from January 7, 1834, to August 25, 1835, alongside George Renwick. In 1835, Millington unsuccessfully ran for a seat in the Michigan Senate, receiving 771 votes. In 1836, Millington unsuccessfully ran for a seat in the Michigan House of Representatives, receiving 1,105 votes. Millington also served as sheriff of Washtenaw County, Michigan.

== Removal from Michigan and death ==
In 1838, Millington moved to St. Charles, Illinois. He died there the same year.
