= 4th Michigan Territorial Council =

Legislature in Michigan Territory (1830–1831)

←	3rd Michigan Territorial Council	5th Michigan Territorial Council	→
- Districts of the Fourth Territorial Council

Overview
- Legislative body: Michigan Territorial Council
- Jurisdiction: Michigan Territory, United States
- Meeting place: Detroit
- Term: May 11, 1830 – March 4, 1831

Michigan Territorial Council
- Members: 13 members
- President: Abraham Edwards

Sessions
- 1st: May 11, 1830 – July 31, 1830
- 2nd: January 4, 1831 – March 4, 1831

The Fourth Michigan Territorial Council was a meeting of the legislative body governing Michigan Territory, known formally as the Legislative Council of the Territory of Michigan. The council met in Detroit in two regular sessions between May 11, 1830, and March 4, 1831, during the terms of Lewis Cass and George B. Porter as territorial governor.

== Leadership and organization ==
Abraham Edwards was president of the council, Edmund A. Brush secretary, and William Meldrum sergeant-at-arms.

== Members ==
A January 1827 act of the United States Congress provided for the direct election of a 13-member legislative council by the people of the territory; the same act gave the council responsibility for determining the apportionment of seats. The council apportioned the seats as follows in an 1828 act:

... the county of Wayne shall form the first electoral district, and shall be entitled to elect four members; the counties of Monroe and Lenawe shall form the second district, and shall be entitled to elect three members; the counties of Macomb and St. Clair shall form the third district, and shall be entitled to elect one member; the county of Oakland shall form the fourth district, and shall be entitled to elect two members; the county of Washtenaw shall form the fifth district, and shall be entitled to elect one member; and the counties of Michilimackinac, Brown, Crawford, and Chippewa shall form the sixth district, and shall be entitled to elect two members of the legislative council.

Members
District	County	Name	Party	Notes
1	Wayne	William Bartow		
1	Wayne	William Brown		
1	Wayne	William A. Fletcher		
1	Wayne	John McDonell	Democratic	
2	Lenawee Monroe	Laurent Durocher	Democratic	
2	Lenawee Monroe	Abraham Edwards	Democratic	
2	Lenawee Monroe	Wolcott Lawrence		
3	Macomb St. Clair	John Stockton	Democratic	
4	Oakland	Thomas J. Drake	Whig	
4	Oakland	Daniel LeRoy	Democratic	
5	Washtenaw	James Kingsley	Democratic	
6	Brown Chippewa Crawford Michilimackinac	Robert Irwin Jr.		Did not appear at second session.
6	Brown Chippewa Crawford Michilimackinac	Henry R. Schoolcraft	Democratic	
