= William Woodbridge =

American judge

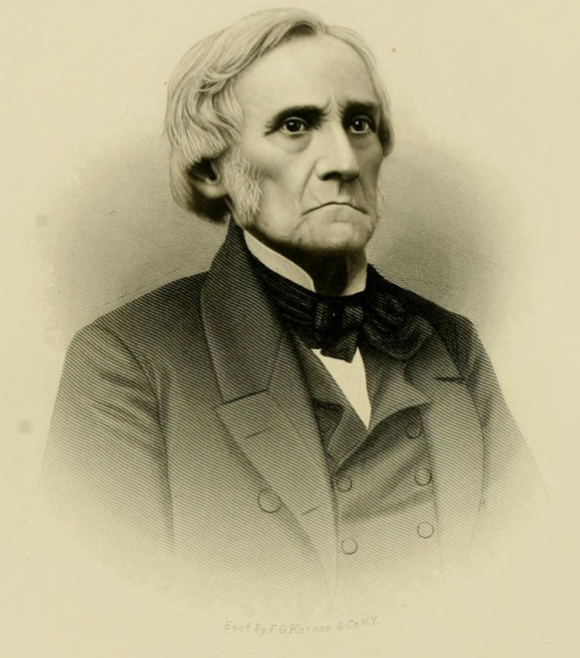
- From 1900's Cyclopedia of Michigan: Historical and Biographical

United States Senator from Michigan
- In office March 4, 1841 – March 3, 1847
- Preceded by: John Norvell
- Succeeded by: Alpheus Felch

2nd Governor of Michigan
- In office January 7, 1840 – February 23, 1841
- Lieutenant: J. Wright Gordon
- Preceded by: Stevens T. Mason
- Succeeded by: J. Wright Gordon

Member of the Michigan Senate from the 1st district
- In office 1838–1840 Serving with Benjamin Berry Kercheval
- Preceded by: Benjamin Berry Kercheval, John McDonell, Jonathan D. Davis
- Succeeded by: Benjamin F. H. Witherell, De Garmo Jones

Delegate to the U.S. House of Representatives from Michigan Territory's at-large district
- In office March 4, 1819 – August 9, 1820
- Preceded by: none
- Succeeded by: Solomon Sibley

3rd Secretary of Michigan Territory
- In office October 15, 1814 – January 15, 1828
- President: James Madison
- Preceded by: Reuben Atwater
- Succeeded by: James Witherell

Member of the Ohio Senate from Washington and Athens counties
- In office 1809–1814
- Preceded by: Leonard Jewett
- Succeeded by: William R. Putnam

Member of the Ohio House of Representatives from Washington and Athens counties
- In office 1808–1809 Serving with Leonard Jewett
- Preceded by: New district
- Succeeded by: Simeon Pool; William R. Putnam

Prosecuting Attorney of Washington County, Ohio
- In office September 9, 1808 – February 6, 1815
- Preceded by: Matthew Backus
- Succeeded by: Caleb Emerson

Personal details
- Born: August 20, 1780 Norwich, Connecticut, U.S.
- Died: October 20, 1861 (aged 81) Detroit, Michigan, U.S.
- Party: Whig
- Spouse: Juliana Trumbull (m. 1806–1860)
- Children: 6
- Education: Litchfield Law School
- Profession: Attorney
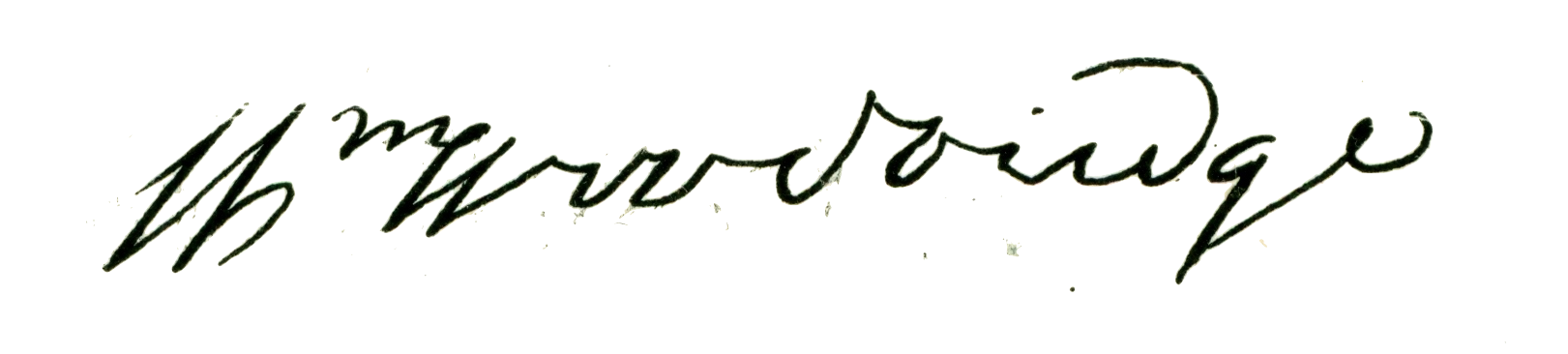
- Signature

William Woodbridge (August 20, 1780 – October 20, 1861) was a U.S. statesman in the states of Ohio and Michigan and in the Michigan Territory prior to statehood. He served as the second governor of Michigan and a United States senator from Michigan.

== Early life in Connecticut and politics in Ohio ==
Woodbridge was born in Norwich, Connecticut on August 20, 1780, a son of Dudley Woodbridge and Lucy (Backus) Woodbridge. He moved to Marietta, Ohio in 1790, where he was raised and educated. He began the study of law in Marietta with his uncle Matthew Backus and developed a close friendship with Lewis Cass, who was also studying in Backus's office. He completed his studies at the Litchfield Law School, was admitted to the bar in Connecticut in 1804, and Ohio in 1806, after which he began a practice in Marietta. In June 1806, he married Juliana Trumbull, the daughter of John Trumbull.

He was elected to the Ohio House of Representatives in 1807, and served from 1808 to 1809. He was elected to the Ohio Senate in 1808, and served from 1809 to 1814. He was also the prosecuting attorney for New London (now Washington County, Ohio) from 1808 to 1814.

== Politics in Michigan Territory ==
In 1814, Lewis Cass, then serving as Governor of Michigan Territory, encouraged Woodbridge to accept appointments as territorial secretary and the collector of customs at the Port of Detroit. On October 15, 1814, Woodbridge accepted the appointments from President James Madison and moved to Detroit. During Cass's frequent absences, Woodbridge served as acting governor.

In 1818, Woodbridge became Michigan Territory's first congressional delegate, serving in the 16th Congress from March 4, 1819, until his resignation on August 9, 1820, due to illness in his family; he was succeeded by Solomon Sibley. As a delegate, Woodbridge worked for the passage of legislation that recognized old French land titles in the territory according to the terms of the previously signed treaties. He also secured approval for the construction of government roads from the Great Miami River to Detroit, and from Detroit to Chicago. He was a strong advocate for Michigan's claim to the Toledo Strip, which was disputed with the state of Ohio.

In 1821, Woodbridge became a trustee of the University of Michigan. In 1828, he was appointed one of three Territorial Supreme Court justices by President John Quincy Adams, succeeding James Witherell and serving in this capacity until 1832 when his term expired.

== Politics and Governorship in the State of Michigan ==
Woodbridge was a delegate to the state constitutional convention in 1835 and a member of the Michigan State Senate from 1838 to 1839, where he represented the 1st district. He was elected as the second Governor of Michigan in 1840, leading the Whig Party to sweeping statewide victories under the slogan "Woodbridge and reform" (along with William Henry Harrison's national campaign). He resigned as governor on February 23, 1841 so he could accept the United States Senate to which he had been elected, and was succeeded by his Lieutenant Governor, J. Wright Gordon.

Woodbridge was elected to the Senate by the Michigan Legislature and served from March 4, 1841, to March 3, 1847. He was only one of two Whig senators who represented Michigan, alongside Augustus S. Porter, with whom he served for most of his term. Woodbridge served as chairman of the Committee on Public Lands in the 28th Congress from 1843 to 1845, and of the Committee on Patents and the Patent Office in the 29th Congress from 1845 to 1847. Democrats controlled the state legislature in 1847, and chose Alpheus Felch as Woodbridge's successor.

== Retirement and death ==
After leaving the Senate, Woodbridge retired from public life and devoted his time to horticulture, especially apple and pear orchards. His farm at the corner of Michigan and Trumbull avenues in Detroit later became a park, then was developed as Tiger Stadium. He died in Detroit on October 20, 1861 and was buried at Elmwood Cemetery.

Features named in Woodbridge's honor include:

- Woodbridge Township, in Hillsdale County, Michigan
- The Woodbridge Historic District and Woodbridge Avenue in Detroit
- Woodbridge Street and Woodbridge Elementary School in Zeeland, Michigan
- Woodbridge Street in Saginaw, Michigan

Party political offices
Preceded by Charles Christopher Trowbridge	Whig nominee for Governor of Michigan; 1839	Succeeded by Philo C. Fuller
Political offices
Preceded by Reuben Atwater	Secretary of Michigan Territory; October 15, 1814 – January 15, 1828	Succeeded by James Witherell
Preceded by Stevens T. Mason	Governor of Michigan; 1840–1841	Succeeded by J. Wright Gordon
Ohio House of Representatives
New district	Representative from Washington and Athens Counties; 1808–1809; Served alongside: Leonard Jewett	Succeeded by Simeon Pool; William R. Putnam
Ohio Senate
Preceded by Leonard Jewett	Senator from Washington and Athens Counties; 1809–1814	Succeeded by William R. Putnam
U.S. House of Representatives
Preceded by New seat	Delegate to the U.S. House of Representatives from Michigan Territory; March 4, 1819 – August 9, 1820	Succeeded by Solomon Sibley
U.S. Senate
Preceded by John Norvell	U.S. senator (Class 2) from Michigan; 1841–1847; Served alongside: Augustus S. Porter, Lewis Cass	Succeeded by Alpheus Felch
