= Joseph Torrey =

Joseph Torrey may refer to:

- Joseph Torrey (academic) (1797–1867), American professor of philosophy and acting president of the University of Vermont
- Joseph W. Torrey (politician) (died 1844), Michigan Territory politician
- Joseph William Torrey (1828–1885), American merchant
