= George Renwick =

George Renwick may refer to:

- Sir George Renwick, 1st Baronet (1850–1931), English politician and shipowner
- George Renwick (athlete) (1901–1984), British athlete who competed mainly in the 400 metres
- George Renwick (American politician) (1789–1831), American politician
- George Renwick (footballer) (1886–1945), Australian rules footballer
