= Michigan's 1st Senate district =

American legislative district

Michigan's 1st State Senate district
Senator
| Erika Geiss; D–Taylor |
- Demographics: 39.7% White; 33.7% Black; 20.7% Hispanic; 0.8% Asian; 0.1% Native American; 0.1% Hawaiian/Pacific Islander; 0.6% Other; 4.4% Multiracial
- Population (2024): 262,075

Michigan's 1st Senate district is one of 38 districts in the Michigan Senate. It has been represented by Democrat Erika Geiss since 2023, succeeding fellow Democrat Stephanie Chang.

== Geography ==
District 1 encompasses part of Wayne County.

=== 2011 Apportionment Plan ===
District 1, as dictated by the 2011 Apportionment Plan, covered parts of Wayne County along the Canadian border, including much of Detroit as well as River Rouge, Ecorse, Wyandotte, Riverview, Trenton, Woodhaven, Gibraltar, Grosse Ile, and parts of Brownstown.

The district was split three ways among Michigan's 12th, 13th, and 14th congressional districts. It overlapped with the 1st, 2nd, 4th, 6th, 14th, and 23rd districts of the Michigan House of Representatives.

== List of senators ==
| Senator | Party | Dates | Residence | Notes |
|---|---|---|---|---|
| Jonathan D. Davis | Democratic | 1835–1837 | Plymouth | |
| Conrad Ten Eyck | Democratic | 1835–1837 | Dearborn | Resigned. |
| John McDonell | Democratic | 1835–1838 | Detroit | Resigned. |
| Benjamin B. Kercheval | Democratic | 1837–1839 | Detroit | Elected in 1837 to fill Conrad Ten Eyck's vacancy. |
| William Woodbridge | Whig | 1838–1839 | Detroit | |
| De Garmo Jones | Whig | 1840–1841 | Detroit | |
| Benjamin F. H. Witherell | Democratic | 1840–1841 | Detroit | |
| Dewitt C. Walker | Democratic | 1842 | Romeo | |
| Lyman Granger | Democratic | 1842–1843 | Columbus | |
| Jonathan Shearer | Democratic | 1842–1844 | Plymouth | |
| Neil Gray Jr. | Democratic | 1843–1844 | Ray | |
| Lorenzo M. Mason | Democratic | 1844–1845 | Port Huron | |
| William Hale | Democratic | 1845–1846 | Detroit | |
| Abner C. Smith | Democratic | 1845–1846 | Mount Clemens | |
| Oel Rix | Democratic | 1846–1847 | Richmond | |
| Andrew T. McReynolds | Democratic | 1847 | Detroit | |
| Robert P. Eldredge | Democratic | 1847–1848 | Mount Clemens | |
| John E. Schwarz | Democratic | 1847–1848 | Detroit | |
| George Griswold | Democratic | 1848–1849 | Detroit | |
| Charles A. Loomis | Democratic | 1848–1849 | Saint Clair | |
| Jacob Summers | Democratic | 1849–1850 | Utica | |
| Titus Dort | Democratic | 1849–1852 | Dearborn | |
| Joseph T. Copeland | Democratic | 1850–1851 | Saint Clair | Resigned, elected circuit judge. |
| Andrew Harvie | Democratic | 1850–1852 | Detroit | |
| Andrew Harvie | Democratic | 1850–1852 | Detroit | |
| Henry C. Kibbee | Democratic | 1851–1852 | Mount Clemens | |
The 1850 Michigan Constitution takes effect, changing the district from a multi-member district to a single-member district.
| George Griswold | Democratic | 1853–1854 | Detroit | |
| Buckminster Wight | Republican | 1855–1856 | Detroit | |
| Alexander H. Redfield | Democratic | 1857–1858 | Detroit | |
| Anthony Dudgeon | Democratic | 1859–1860 | Detroit | |
| William Adair | Democratic | 1861–1866 | Detroit | |
| Paul Gies | Democratic | 1867–1868 | Detroit | |
| William Adair | Democratic | 1869–1870 | Detroit | |
| James W. Romeyn | Democratic | 1871–1872 | Detroit | |
| William B. Wesson | Republican | 1873–1874 | Detroit | |
| William Adair | Democratic | 1875–1878 | Detroit | |
| James D. Weir | Democratic | 1879–1880 | Detroit | |
| James Caplis | Republican | 1881–1882 | Detroit | |
| James W. Romeyn | Democratic | 1883–1884 | Detroit | |
| Michael Greiner | Democratic | 1885–1886 | Wayne County | |
| John Rairden | Republican | 1887–1888 | Detroit | Also backed by the Labor Party. |
| Joseph Nagel | Democratic | 1889–1890 | Detroit | |
| Frank Smith | Democratic | 1891–1892 | Detroit | |
| Lewis C. Hough | Democratic | 1893–1894 | Plymouth | |
| F. Markham Briggs | Republican | 1895–1896 | Plymouth | |
| Arthur L. Holmes | Republican | 1897–1898 | Detroit | |
| John J. Perren | Democratic | 1899–1900 | Detroit | |
| Arthur L. Holmes | Republican | 1901–1902 | Detroit | |
| William P. Scullen | Democratic | 1903–1904 | Greenfield | |
| Frederick C. Martindale | Republican | 1905–1908 | Greenfield | |
| Lawrence W. Snell | Republican | 1909–1912 | Highland Park | |
| Clarence E. Gittins | Progressive | 1913–1914 | Highland Park | |
| Louis N. Hilsendegen | Republican | 1915–1916 | Grosse Pointe | |
| Herman L. Koehler | Republican | 1917–1918 | Detroit | |
| Walter J. Hayes | Republican | 1919–1924 | Wayne County | |
| Roy Herald | Republican | 1925–1926 | Highland Park | |
| George Defer | Republican | 1927 | Detroit | Died in office. |
| Fred W. Harding | Republican | 1929–1932 | Grosse Pointe | |
| James A. Murphy | Democratic | 1933–1939 | Detroit | Died in office. |
| Carl W. Bischoff | Democratic | 1939–1940 | Detroit | |
| Ernest G. Nagel | Democratic | 1941–1942 | Detroit | |
| Charles N. Youngblood Sr. | Democratic | 1943–1946 | Detroit | |
| Matthew F. Callahan | Republican | 1947–1948 | Detroit | |
| Harold M. Ryan | Democratic | 1949–1962 | Detroit | Resigned. |
| Charles N. Youngblood Jr. | Democratic | 1963–1964 | Detroit | |
| George S. Fitzgerald | Democratic | 1965–1974 | Grosse Pointe Park | |
| William B. Fitzgerald Jr. | Democratic | 1975–1978 | Detroit | |
| John F. Kelly | Democratic | 1979–1994 | Detroit | |
| Joseph F. Young Jr. | Democratic | 1995–2002 | Detroit | |
| Hansen Clarke | Democratic | 2003–2010 | Detroit | |
| Coleman Young II | Democratic | 2011–2018 | Detroit | |
| Stephanie Chang | Democratic | 2019–2022 | Detroit | |
| Erika Geiss | Democratic | 2023–present | Taylor | |
| Justin Onwenu | Democratic | (Note: Member-elect.) | | |

== Recent election results ==
=== 2020s ===
2026 Michigan Senate election
Primary election
| Party | Candidate | Votes | % |
|---|---|---|---|
| Democratic | Justin Onwenu | 18,928 | 58.67 |
| Democratic | Abraham Aiyash | 13,336 | 41.33 |
| Total votes | | 32,264 | 100 |
| Republican | Patrick O'Connell | 4,060 | 100 |
| Total votes | | 4,060 | 100 |
General election
| Democratic | Justin Onwenu | 67,639 | 83.31 |
| Republican | Patrick O'Connell | 13,550 | 16.69 |
| Total votes | | 81,189 | 100 |
| Democratic hold | | | |

2022 Michigan Senate election, District 1
Primary election
| Party | Candidate | Votes | % |
|---|---|---|---|
| Democratic | Erika Geiss (incumbent) | 6,824 | 32.3 |
| Democratic | Brenda K. Sanders | 4,912 | 23.3 |
| Democratic | Frank Liberati | 4,842 | 22.9 |
| Democratic | Shellee M. Brooks | 2,089 | 9.9 |
| Democratic | Ricardo R. Moore | 1,673 | 7.9 |
| Democratic | Carl J. Schwartz | 774 | 3.7 |
| Total votes | | 21,114 | 100 |
General election
| Democratic | Erika Geiss (incumbent) | 53,475 | 71.6 |
| Republican | Erik Soderquist | 21,243 | 28.4 |
| Total votes | | 74,718 | 100 |
| Democratic hold | | | |

=== 2018 ===
2018 Michigan Senate election, District 1
Primary election
| Party | Candidate | Votes | % |
|---|---|---|---|
| Democratic | Stephanie Chang | 16,427 | 49.8 |
| Democratic | Alberta Tinsley-Talabi | 8,710 | 26.4 |
| Democratic | Bettie Cook Scott | 3,698 | 11.2 |
| Democratic | James Cole Jr. | 1,717 | 5.2 |
| Democratic | Stephanie Roehm | 1,464 | 4.4 |
| Democratic | Nicholas Rivera | 941 | 2.9 |
| Total votes | | 32,957 | 100 |
General election
| Democratic | Stephanie Chang | 62,071 | 72.0 |
| Republican | Pauline Montie | 20,879 | 24.2 |
| Green | David Bullock | 3,257 | 3.8 |
| Total votes | | 86,207 | 100 |
| Democratic hold | | | |

=== 2014 ===
2014 Michigan Senate election, District 1
| Party | Candidate | Votes | % |
|---|---|---|---|
| Democratic | Coleman Young II (incumbent) | 48,510 | 71.8 |
| Republican | Barry Berk | 19,021 | 28.2 |
| Total votes | | 67,531 | 100 |
| Democratic hold | | | |

=== Federal and statewide results ===
| Year | Office | Results |
|---|---|---|
| 2020 | President | Biden 70.4 – 28.3% |
| 2018 | Senate | Stabenow 72.0 – 26.1% |
| 2018 | Governor | Whitmer 73.4 – 24.2% |
| 2016 | President | Clinton 70.6 – 26.2% |
| 2014 | Senate | Peters 77.1 – 19.9% |
| 2014 | Governor | Schauer 70.0 – 28.4% |
| 2012 | President | Obama 78.0 – 21.4% |
| 2012 | Senate | Stabenow 80.0 – 17.2% |

== Historical district boundaries ==
| Map | Description | Apportionment Plan | Notes |
|---|---|---|---|
| | Wayne County (part); Detroit (part); Grosse Pointe; Grosse Pointe Farms; Grosse Pointe Park | 1964 Apportionment Plan | |
| | Macomb County (part); Lake Township; Wayne County (part); Detroit (part); Grosse Pointe; Grosse Pointe Farms; Grosse Pointe Park; Grosse Pointe Township | 1972 Apportionment Plan | |
| | Wayne County (part); Detroit (part); Grosse Pointe; Grosse Pointe Farms; Grosse Pointe Park; Grosse Pointe Township; Grosse Pointe Woods; Harper Woods | 1982 Apportionment Plan | |
| | Wayne County (part); Detroit (part); Grosse Pointe; Grosse Pointe Farms; Grosse Pointe Park; Grosse Pointe Township; Grosse Pointe Woods; Harper Woods | 1992 Apportionment Plan | |
| | Wayne County (part); Detroit (part) | 2001 Apportionment Plan | |
| | Wayne County (part); Brownstown Township (part); Detroit (part); Ecorse; Gibraltar; Grosse Ile Township; River Rouge; Riverview; Trenton; Woodhaven; Wyandotte | 2011 Apportionment Plan | |
