= Justice Witherell =

Justice Witherell may refer to:

- Benjamin F. H. Witherell (1797–1867), associate justice of the Michigan Supreme Court
- James Witherell (1759–1838), associate justice of the Supreme Court for the Territory of Michigan
