= Justin Onwenu =

American politician

Senator-elect for the Michigan Senate
- Preceded by: Erika Geiss
- Constituency: 1st Senate district

Personal details
- Party: Democratic
- Education: Rice University (Bachelor's degree); Columbia Law School (Doctor of Law)
- Occupation: State senator-elect, attorney, community organizer, educator
- Website: Official website

Justin Onwenu is a Detroit state senator-elect, attorney, community organizer, and educator. In November 2026, running as a Democrat, he won the election for the 1st Senate district for the Michigan Senate. He previously served as the City of Detroit's first Director of Entrepreneurship and Economic Opportunity, and Detroit’s Director of Small Business Affairs.

== Biography ==
Onwenu is a fourth generation Detroiter. His mother was a nurse and healthcare administrator in Detroit and his father was a Detroit Public Schools teacher and small business owner. Onwenu received a bachelor's degree from Rice University, where he served as student body president. He was drawn to community activism in 2017 while at Rice, after seeing damage from Hurricane Harvey and the long term effects on poor Black and Hispanic neighborhoods. At Rice, he was an activist and lead signatory on a national campaign to stop universities from reducing financial aid for students who receive scholarships. After graduating from Rice, Onwenu served as a community organizer for the Sierra Club. He worked in Michigan’s most polluted zip code, advocating for neighborhood investment and public health protections to protect residents from toxic air and water. In 2020, Crain's Detroit named Onwenu one of its 20 in their Twenties for his community activism, including mobilizing Detroit's COVID response. His efforts, along with friends Bridget Quinn and Lauren Schandevel, to help create and moderate the Metro Detroit COVID-19 Support group were profiled by NPR. Also in 2020, Onwenu was a Bernie Sanders delegate.

In 2024, after graduating from Columbia Law School with a Doctor of Law degree and as student body president, Onwenu was named by then-Detroit Mayor Mike Duggan as the city's first Director of Entrepreneurship and Economic Opportunity. In this role, he championed blockchain technology, and in January 2025, Detroit became the largest US city to accept cryptocurrency for tax and other payments. He also created a program in 2024 for blockchain entrepreneurs to propose ideas for civic blockchain applications. He was also an adjunct professor at the University of Detroit Mercy School of Law, as of October 2025.

In January 2026, Onwenu was appointed by Mayor Mary Sheffield as Detroit’s Director of Small Business Affairs (SBA). As Detroit's SBA Director, he helped the city launch funding programs for Detroit businesses, including the Detroit Startup Fund, and the Detroit Legacy Business Project. He also served as the youngest member of Michigan Governor Gretchen Whitmer's Black Leadership Advisory Council, tasked with promoting economic growth by identifying state laws that perpetuated racial inequality.

=== Political career ===
In August 2026, Onwenu won the Democratic Senate primary for Michigan's newly redistricted 1st Senate district, representing Detroit and Downriver, the suburban municipalities of Wayne County. His endorsements included Senator Bernie Sanders, along with a mix of progressive and moderate city and state Democrats. Onwenu's opponent for the Nov. 3 general election was Republican Patrick O’Connell. The redrawn district leans heavily Democrat.

On November 3, 2026, Onwenu was elected as Michigan's state senator for District 1, after winning over 90% of the votes.

== Personal life ==
Onwenu lives in Detroit.
