= British occupation of the Michigan Territory =

British occupation of American territory during the War of 1812

British Michigan Territory
- 1812–1813
- Union Flag (1801 version)
- Anthem: "God Save the King"
- British occupied Michigan Territory during the War of 1812
- Status: Military occupation by the British Empire
- Capital: Detroit
- Common languages: English
- Government: Monarchy
  - King: George III
  - Governor General: Sir George Prevost
  - Civil Governor: Henry Procter
  - Chief Justice: Augustus B. Woodward (Note: Woodward stayed in Detroit and maintained his judicial status. When the British requested he become Secretary of the Territory, Woodward refused and was later expelled.)
- Historical era: War of 1812
  - Surrender of Detroit: 16 August 1812
  - Liberation of Detroit: 29 September 1813
Preceded by	Succeeded by
Michigan Territory	Michigan Territory
- Today part of: State of Michigan

The British occupation of the Michigan Territory began when the American territorial governor, Brigadier General William Hull, surrendered the Territory of Michigan to the British Empire on 16 August 1812. The territory was occupied by the United Kingdom during the War of 1812 and was at least nominally a part of the Province of Upper Canada.

== History ==
=== Fall of Detroit ===
Hull surrendered Detroit after a short siege, led by a coalition of British and indigenous forces from Upper Canada, led by Major General Isaac Brock and Chief Tecumseh. After the surrender of Michigan, Colonel Henry Procter, Brock's second-in-command was appointed as civil governor. The reaction of the American public and government officials to Hull's surrender was that of disbelief and fury. For the first time since the American Revolutionary War, British forces occupied American territory.

=== End of the occupation ===
Following the American naval victory at the Battle of Lake Erie, the British abandoned the Michigan Territory. On 29 September 1813, elements of Major General William Henry Harrison's Army of the Northwest arrived in Detroit. American control over Michigan was restored.
