= Joseph W. Torrey (politician) =

American politician

Member of the Michigan Territorial Council from the 1st district
- In office May 1, 1832 – April 23, 1833

Personal details
- Born: Connecticut
- Died: 1844 Connecticut

Joseph W. Torrey was a Michigan politician.

== Early life ==
Torrey was born in Connecticut. At some point, Torrey moved to the Michigan Territory.

== Career ==
Torrey was a lawyer. Torrey served recorder of Detroit in 1829 and as probate judge from 1829 to 1833. He was supporter of President Andrew Jackson during his time in Detroit. Torrey served on the Michigan Territorial Council from May 1, 1832 to April 23, 1833.

== Death ==
Torrey moved back to Connecticut in 1844, and died the same year.
