= Charles C. Hascall =

American politician

Member of the Michigan Senate from the 5th district
- In office November 2, 1835 – July 26, 1836

Personal details
- Born: November 7, 1796 Peru, Massachusetts
- Died: October 5, 1862 (aged 65) Flint, Michigan
- Party: Democratic

Charles Chandler Hascall (November 7, 1796 – October 5, 1862) was an American newspaper publisher and politician. He served in the Michigan Senate during its first session after adoption of the state constitution.

== Biography ==
Charles Chandler Hascall was born in Peru, Massachusetts, on November 7, 1796, to Samuel Hascall and Esther Starkweather. His father died while he was young, and he and his brother William were adopted by his uncle Jeremiah. Jeremiah already had a son named Charles, so Hascall was known as Charles Chandler or just Chandler. He served in the War of 1812.

He moved to Michigan Territory in 1819, and opened a hotel in Auburn, Michigan, as early as 1825. He was a justice of the peace in Pontiac Township, Michigan, from 1827 to 1829, and township clerk in 1829 and 1830. Complaints were made about Hascall's conduct as justice of the peace in 1828, but Territorial Governor Lewis Cass did not find sufficient cause to remove him from office. He represented Oakland County on the Territorial Council from 1832 to 1835, and was elected as a Democrat to the Michigan Senate for its first term from 1835 to 1837.

Hascall moved to Genesee County in 1836. That same year, he was appointed receiver of public monies for Michigan, and resigned his senate seat on the final day of its session, on July 26, 1836, in order to begin serving in the post. He was removed from the post in 1842, and President James K. Polk re-appointed him in March 1845.

Hascall reached the rank of major general in the state militia. During the Black Hawk War he was commander of the Oakland Cavalry and assembled a company of mounted men to serve under Winfield Scott. He commanded a division during the time of Toledo War, and led them on a march to Toledo in 1835, but as there was no enemy to fight, they returned to their homes soon after.

He was involved with several companies building roads and railroads in Michigan. He received a contract for $20,000 (equivalent to $604,688 in 2025) to construct the portion of a railroad extending through Genesee County in 1838 and 1839. In 1846, an act of the legislature incorporated the Pontiac and Genesee Railroad Company, with Hascall as one of its commissioners, and in 1847 he was a commissioner of the Port Huron and Lake Michigan Railroad Company. In April 1848, he became a commissioner for two separate plank road companies, one that planned to build a road from Flint, to Grand Blanc, Michigan, which was never built, and another to build a road from Flint to Fentonville, which was completed several years later.

Hascall began publishing The Genesee Republican, a Democratic-aligned paper, on April 17, 1845. He was part of a committee that drafted a city charter in January 1855 that led to Flint, Michigan, becoming a city the following month.

He died in Flint on October 5, 1862, and is buried there in Glenwood Cemetery.

=== Family ===
Hascall married his cousin Charlotte Hascall, the daughter of his uncle who had adopted him and his brother. They divorced, and in 1819 he remarried, to Nancy Rounds. They had one child who died while young, and five who lived to adulthood: Charles C., Angeline (also spelled Angelina and Angeolina), Esther, Richard M., and Henry C. Angeline married future Michigan governor Moses Wisner, and the two of them entertained the Prince of Wales—later Edward VII—during his tour of North America.
