= Augustus B. Woodward =

American judge (1774–1827)

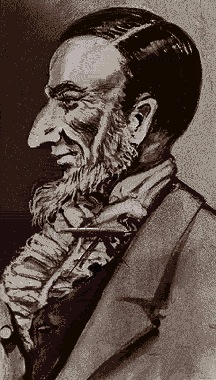

Chief Justice for the Territory of Florida
- In office August 26, 1824 – June 12, 1827
- Appointed by: James Monroe

Chief Justice for the Territory of Michigan under British occupation (1812–1813)
- In office March 3, 1805 – February 1, 1824
- Appointed by: Thomas Jefferson

Personal details
- Born: November 1774 New York City, New York, British America
- Died: June 12, 1827 (aged 52) Tallahassee, Florida Territory, U.S.
- Education: Columbia College

Augustus Brevoort Woodward (born Elias Brevoort Woodward; November 1774 – June 12, 1827) was an American attorney and politician who served as the territorial Chief Justice for the Michigan Territory from 1805 to 1824 and for the Florida Territory from 1824 until 1827.

Woodward was born in 1774 in New York City, Province of New York to a middle-class merchant family. He studied at Columbia College and later worked as a clerk in the Treasury Department before reading law in Rockbridge County, Virginia, and practicing as an attorney in Washington, D.C. In 1805, President Thomas Jefferson appointed him Chief Justice of the newly created Michigan Territory. Following the Great Fire of 1805 in Detroit, Woodward designed an urban plan for the city modeled after the radial avenues of Paris and Washington, D.C. Officials at the time largely discarded it, but further developments incorporated some elements of his vision for the city, such as Woodward Avenue. In 1824, President James Monroe appointed him to a federal judgeship in the Florida Territory, where he served until his death in 1827 at age 52.

Woodward's record on slavery is a subject of controversy. Earlier in his life, Woodward was a slaveholder, owning slaves while living in the Southern slave state of Virginia. Although Michigan was a free territory, it still held enslaved people due to the legacy of British and French rule. While serving as Chief Justice, Woodward ruled in the 1807 case Denison v. Tucker that individuals enslaved before Michigan came under American control would remain enslaved for life. This ruling forced the Denison family to flee to Canada.

== Early life ==
He was born Elias Brevoort Woodward in 1774 in New York City, the son of John and Ann Silvester Woodward. His mother was of Flemish ancestry, and his father was of English descent. John Woodward was a merchant and importer, as well as a soldier in the Continental Army. The family lived in Manhattan on the corner of Pine and Pearl Streets.

Woodward graduated from Columbia College. After working in Philadelphia as a clerk in the U.S. Treasury Department, he later read the law and practiced as an attorney in Washington, DC.

Woodward never married. His biographer, Arthur M. Woodford, describes Woodward as a prototype of Washington Irving's Ichabod Crane. He stood 6 feet 3 inches (1.91 m) tall, and was thin, sallow, and stooped. His long, narrow face was dominated by a big nose. He had thick, black hair. His contemporaries commented on his slovenliness. While living in Washington, D.C., Woodward was described as "a man of middle age, a hardened bachelor who wore nut-brown clothing . . . he slept in his office which was never swept ... and was eccentric and erratic. His friends were few and his practice was so small that he hardly made a living." But while working in Washington, he got to know President Thomas Jefferson, and they shared scientific and education interests.

== Michigan Territory ==
President Thomas Jefferson appointed Woodward on March 3, 1805, as the Michigan Territory's first Chief Justice. When Woodward arrived in Detroit on June 30, 1805, he found the city in ruins from the devastating fire earlier that month on June 11. Few buildings were left standing.

Woodward, with Governor William Hull and associate Justices John Griffin and Frederick Bates, possessed all the legislative power in the Territory. Woodward and Griffin, along with the current Governor and a third judge, held this power from 1805 until the institution of a legislature in 1824. Woodward and Hull bickered almost constantly. One of Woodward's legacies is the Woodward Code: a series of statutes serving as the basis of the Territorial Supreme Court legal procedures.

During the War of 1812, Governor Hull surrendered Detroit to the British without a shot being fired in the Battle of Detroit. While Hull and Justices Bates and Griffin left, Woodward stayed and maintained his judicial status in Detroit during the British occupation. The colonial government appointed him as Provincial Secretary of the Territory, but Woodward declined that offer. Eventually, he became a problem for the British. He was asked to leave the territory and was granted safe passage to New York. The United States regained control of Detroit in 1813.

Shortly after the formation of the Territory of Michigan, Woodward was involved in reorganizing the territory's education system. As the territory's chief justice, he managed much of the legal work to consolidate the French Christian schools led by Gabriel Richard and established it as the Catholepistemiad, or University of Michigania, in 1817. The university initially had authority over all cultural establishments in the territory.

Following the destruction of Detroit in the Great Fire of 1805, it fell to Woodward and Hull to oversee the rebuilding of the then territorial capital. The resulting plan drew heavily from Pierre L'Enfant's layout for Washington, D.C. Woodward proposed a system of hexagonal street blocks, with the Grand Circus at its center. Wide avenues, alternatively 200 feet and 120 feet, were designed to radiate from large circular plazas like spokes from the hub of a wheel. Most prominent of these are the construction of the six main "spokes" of Woodward, Michigan, Grand River, Gratiot, and Jefferson avenues and Fort Street.

Though ambitious, Woodward's Plan for Detroit would ultimately be discarded in 1817 while he was away in Washington. Instead of following the pattern laid out by Woodward, then Territorial Governor Lewis Cass platted 10,000-acres of the surrounding countryside into a more typical (for Midwestern America) Grid Plan of 160-acre rectangular farms girded by rectangular roads. This new platting became the basis for the modern layout of Detroit. Despite this remnants of the original plan can still be found within the city's downtown, including the radial avenues emanating from the Campus Martius, the Campus itself, and the Grand Circus.

== Later years ==
August 26, 1824, saw Woodward's return to the judiciary, as President James Monroe appointed him to a judgeship in the new Territory of Florida. Woodward served in that capacity until his death in Tallahassee on June 12, 1827, at the age of 52.

== Legacy and honors ==
- Woodward is commemorated in a Michigan Legal Milestone erected by the State Bar of Michigan.
- Woodward Avenue in the city and Metro Detroit is named after him.
