= Reuben Atwater =

American politician

Reuben Atwater, also known as Reuben Attwater (May 11, 1768 – February 1831) was the Secretary of Michigan Territory and served as acting governor during 1811–1812.

== Biography ==
Reuben Atwater was born in 1768, in Vermont, the son of Reuben Attwater and Mary Russell. He married Eliza Williard, and after her death married Sarah Lamb, daughter of General John Lamb. Atwater had two children: Catharine Atwater and Clinton Edward Atwater. Atwater was the Secretary of Michigan Territory from March 18, 1808, to October 15, 1814, and was at the same time collector for the port of Detroit. He directed the 1810 census of the Michigan Territory, acted as Land Commissioner until 1811, and served as acting governor during the absence of Governor William Hull in 1811–12. Atwater Street in Detroit was named after him.

Reuben Atwater died in 1831.
