= John Griffin (judge) =

American judge

- Born: 1774 or 1779; Scotland or Virginia, US
- Education: College of William and Mary
- Occupation: Judge on the Michigan Territory Supreme Court
- Father: Cyrus Griffin

John Griffin (born 1774 or 1779 – death unknown) was an American judge. He was one of the original judges of the Supreme Court of Michigan Territory.

Griffin was born in either Scotland or Virginia. His father was Cyrus Griffin, the last president of the Continental Congress, and his mother was the daughter of a Scottish baron. He graduated from the College of William and Mary and studied law, and was appointed a judge in the Indiana Territory in 1800 by President John Adams. He did not like the climate, and in 1806 his father convinced President Thomas Jefferson to transfer him to the Supreme Court of the recently created Michigan Territory.

While on the court in Michigan, he generally deferred to the opinions of Chief Justice Augustus Woodward, going so far as to refuse to hear cases by himself without Woodward there to offer his opinion. He spent seventeen years on the court, and has been called "one of the most petulantly dissatisfied office-holders of all time" because he spent the entire time trying to find another job.
