= Benjamin F. H. Witherell =

American judge (1797–1867)

Benjamin Franklin Hawkins Witherell (August 4, 1797 – June 26, 1867) was a jurist in the U.S. state of Michigan. He served as a justice of the Michigan Supreme Court in 1857.

== Biography ==
Witherell was born in Fair Haven, Vermont, the second son and fifth of six children of James Witherell. His father moved to Detroit, Michigan, in 1808 after being appointed by U.S. President Thomas Jefferson as a Judge of the Supreme Court for the Territory of Michigan. With the impending outbreak of hostilities in the War of 1812, Benjamin was sent back to Vermont with his mother in 1811. He studied the classics privately in Troy, New York, and returned to Detroit in 1817. He then studied law in the offices of his father and of Territorial Secretary William Woodbridge and was admitted to the bar in 1819. He was subsequently admitted to the bar of the Supreme Court of the United States on the motion of Daniel Webster.

He served as prosecuting attorney and judge in various local and state courts through the 1820s and 1830s. He was appointed a Justice of the Peace in 1824 and Recorder of the City of Detroit in 1828. In 1834–1835, he was a Judge of Probate, and from 1835 to 1839, he was Prosecuting Attorney for Wayne County. In 1840 and 1841, he served in the Michigan State Senate. He also held at various times, the military offices of Judge Advocate General, Brigadier General, and Major General of the militia.

In 1842, Witherell lost an election for mayor of Detroit, with Zina Pitcher receiving 793 votes to 479 for Witherell. Soon afterwards, the state legislature abolished the District Court of the County of Wayne, officiated by Judge Henry C. Chipman, and replaced it with the District Court for the Counties of Wayne, Oakland, Washtenaw and Jackson. Governor John S. Barry appointed Witherell to be judge of the new court, where he served until the court was abolished by the Michigan Constitution of 1850. Witherell was a delegate to the constitutional convention of 1850 that revised the Michigan Constitution. He was a regent of the University of Michigan, 1848–1852.

In 1857, Witherell was appointed as Judge of the Circuit Court of Wayne County, to fill the vacancy caused by the resignation of Judge Samuel T. Douglass. He was twice re-elected to the Circuit Court serving until his death in 1867. During his term, he served in 1858 on the Michigan Supreme Court, since at the time, the court was constituted of Circuit Court judges. From 1862 to 1864, he was also Judge of the Recorder's Court.

He was called by his intimate friends a "Walking Historical Dictionary of Detroit," and published a series of Historical Recollections. He also took an active interest in all public affairs during the Civil War, and was the originator, and chosen President of the Soldiers' and Sailors' Monument Association at the time of his death. He wrote several articles on the early history of Michigan for the Detroit Free Press under the pen name 'Hamtramck'. From 1855 to 1867, he was the Historiographer of the City of Detroit and was President of the State Historical Society for many years.

Witherell owned land in several parts of Southeast Michigan, including section 29 of Ypsilanti Township in Washtenaw County, section 33 of Township 5N16E (St. Clair Township) in St. Clair County, and sections 34 and 35 of Warren Township in Macomb County. He was also among the first purchasers of land in Lynn Township in St. Clair County.

As a member of "The First Methodist Episcopal Society of the City of Detroit", incorporated in 1822, he was a trustee for several lots of land on which Methodist churches were located in downtown Detroit.

== Family and legacy ==
Witherell was the uncle of U.S. Senator Thomas W. Palmer. He was married three times. In 1824, he married Mary A. Sprague of Poultney, Vermont. They had four children, Martha E., James B., Harriet C. M., and Julia A. Mary died in August 1834, and Witherell married Delia A. Ingersoll in 1837. they had one child, Charles I. Delia died in 1847, and he married Cassandra S. Brady, who died in March 1863. Witherell is interred in Elmwood Cemetery in Detroit.

== References and notes ==
- Michigan Supreme Court Historical Society. BENJAMIN F.H. WITHERELL, 18th Justice Accessed 2007-07-28
- The Political Graveyard
- Burton, Clarence M. (2005) [1922]. The city of Detroit, Michigan, 1701-1922. Ann Arbor, Mich.: University of Michigan Library.
- Caitlin, George B., ed. (2005) [1922]. Local history of Detroit and Wayne County. Ann Arbor, Mich.: University of Michigan Library.
- Carlisle, Fred (comp.) (2005) [1890]. "s.v. Benjamin F. H. Witherell". Wayne County Historical and Pioneer Society. Ann Arbor, Mich.: University of Michigan Library. pp. 277–278.
- Chas. Chapman Co. (2005) [1881]. History of Washtenaw County, Michigan. Ann Arbor, Mich.: University of Michigan Library.
- Eldridge, Robert F. (2005) [1905]. Past and present of Macomb County, Michigan: together with biographical sketches of many of its leading and prominent citizens and illustrious dead. Ann Arbor, Mich.: University of Michigan Library.
- Farmer, Silas (2005) [1889]. "s.v. Benjamin Franklin Hawkins Witherell". The history of Detroit and Michigan; or, The metropolis illustrated; a full record of territorial days in Michigan, and the annals of Wayne County. Ann Arbor, Mich.: University of Michigan Library. pp. 1133–1134.
- Lanman, Charles (2005) [1871]. "s.v. Witherell, Benjamin F. H.". The red book of Michigan; a civil, military and biographical history. Ann Arbor, Mich.: University of Michigan Library. p. 502.
- History of St. Clair County, Michigan, containing an account of its settlement, growth, development and resources, its war record, biographical sketches, the whole preceded by a history of Michigan. Ann Arbor, Mich.: University of Michigan Library. 2005 [1883].
