= James Kingsley =

American politician (1797–1878)

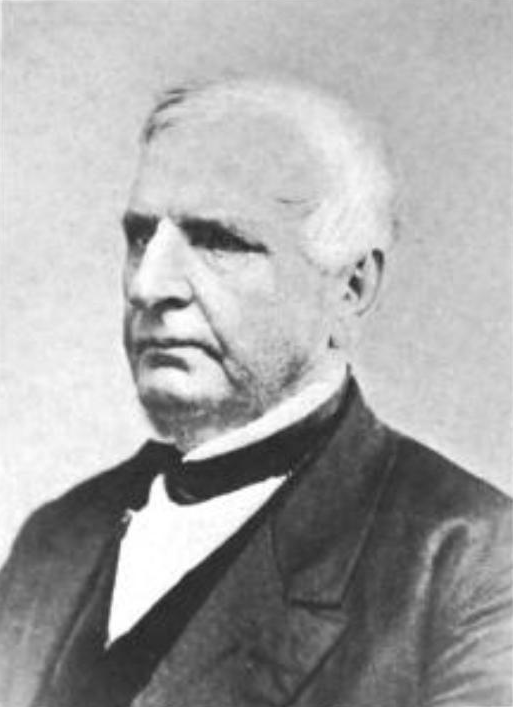
James Kingsley

James Kingsley (6 January 1797 – 10 August 1878) was an attorney and mayor of Ann Arbor from 1855 to 1856.

Attorney James "Honest Jim" Kingsley, who came to Ann Arbor in 1826, was the first member of the Washtenaw County Bar, a probate judge, and a member of both the territorial and later the state legislature, as well as Ann Arbor's second mayor and a regent of the University of Michigan.

Kingsley Street in Ann Arbor is named after him.

== Sources ==
- James Kingsley: Ann Arbor District Library
- History of the University of Michigan, By Burke Aaron Hinsdale Published by the University of Michigan, 1906; p. 182
- Kingsley Family Papers, 1830-1901, Bentley Historical Library.
