= George Renwick (American politician) =

American politician (1789–1863)

Member of the Michigan House of Representatives from the Washtenaw County district
- In office January 7, 1839 – April 13, 1841
- In office January 4, 1847 – March 17, 1847

Personal details
- Born: October 31, 1789 England
- Died: June 1863 (aged 73)
- Party: Whig

George Renwick (October 31, 1789 – June 1863) was a Michigan politician.

== Early life ==
Renwick was born in England on October 31, 1789. In 1802, Renwick immigrated with his father's family to the United States, where they settled in Gorham, New York. Renwick attended school in Canandaigua, New York, and taught school in the winter. Renwick worked as a carpenter and a farmer in his early life. In 1817, Renwick moved to Greece, New York. In 1828, Renwick moved to Salem, Michigan Territory.

== Career ==
Renwick served on the Michigan Territorial Council, where he represented the 4th district from May 1, 1832 to August 25, 1835. On November 5, 1838, Renwick was elected to the Michigan House of Representatives where he represented the Washtenaw County district from January 7, 1839 to April 13, 1841. On November 2, 1840, Renwick was again elected to the state house, where he represented the same district from January 4, 1847 to March 17, 1847.

== Death ==
Renwick died in the June of 1863.
