= Michigan Territorial Council =

Defunct American legislative body

- Michigan Territory

Type
- Type: Unicameral

History
- Founded: June 7, 1824
- Disbanded: January 14, 1836
- Preceded by: Governor and judges of Michigan Territory
- Succeeded by: Michigan Legislature (in 1835); Legislative Assembly of the Wisconsin Territory (in 1836)

Structure
- Length of term: 2 years
- Authority: Act of March 3, 1823, 3 Stat. 769

Meeting place
- Detroit, Michigan (through 1835); Green Bay, Wisconsin (1836)

The Michigan Territorial Council, known formally as the Legislative Council of the Territory of Michigan, was the legislative body of the Territory of Michigan from 1824 to 1835, when it was succeeded by the Michigan Legislature in anticipation of Michigan becoming a U.S. state (though this did not happen until 1837). A session of the council including only members from what would become Wisconsin Territory met in 1836.

== History ==
The council represented the second stage of Michigan's evolution from a territory administered by a governor and judges to full statehood.

=== Background ===
Since its creation from part of Indiana Territory in 1805, the government of Michigan Territory had consisted of a governor, a secretary, and three judges. In this "first stage" government outlined by the Northwest Ordinance, the governor—or the secretary, in his absence—exercised executive power, with the judges forming the judicial branch of government, and all of them were appointed by Congress. The governor and judges had the authority to adopt laws from already-existing states to their own use in the territory, and so collectively formed the legislative branch. The governor and judges organized a Supreme Court consisting of the judges in 1805, after which it was not always clear whether the judges were acting in a judicial or legislative capacity.

In January 1818, Territorial Governor Lewis Cass called an election to decide whether the territory should proceed to the "second stage" of government provided by the Northwest Ordinance. His proposal lost due primarily to financial concerns over the cost of a legislature that would be paid for by the territory itself, whereas the governor and judges were paid by the federal government. Public frustration with the system of government continued to grow, in part because the judges—who had lifetime appointments—refused to hear cases anywhere other than Detroit, requiring plaintiffs and defendants from across the territory to make the sometimes months-long round trip to Detroit for the court's one term per year. Hundreds of residents signed a petition to Congress in 1822 demanding a four-year term for the judges.

=== Creation of the council ===
An act of Congress on March 3, 1823, created a four-year term for the judges and transferred the powers of the territory to the governor and a legislative council of nine people serving terms of two years. The names of the top eighteen vote-earners in a general election were to be sent by the governor to the president of the United States, who would nominate nine of them to serve on the council, with the advice and consent of the Senate. The council was to meet at a place of the governor's choosing for no more than 60 days per year, and any acts of the council were subject to disapproval by Congress. Each member received a salary of $2 per day while in session, plus an additional $2 per twenty miles traveled to and from the session, paid by the federal government. The act stopped short of creating a general assembly comprising both a legislative council and house of representatives, as stipulated in the Northwest Ordinance. It did authorize the council to put the question of whether a general assembly should be organized to a vote of the people at any time, but the council took no such action during its existence.

The size of the council was increased to thirteen by an act of Congress in 1825, and in 1827 the system of presidential appointment was replaced by direct election of the council by the people. Under this system, the governor had the power of veto, and all of council's acts required the approval of Congress.

=== Final sessions ===
At its extra session in November 1834, the council authorized the election of delegates to a state constitutional convention in April 1835. Anticipating that the convention would organize a new state legislature to govern the portion of the territory set to become the state of Michigan, but not wanting to leave the rest of the territory without effective government, the council authorized the governor to apportion the seats on the next council among those counties that would remain in the territory. On the final day of the Sixth Council, Governor Stevens T. Mason called for the newly constituted council to meet in Green Bay, Wisconsin, on January 1, 1836.

This final session of the council, known as the Rump Council, was held in Green Bay in 1836 but had little to do besides read reports and draft memorials to Congress. It was supplanted by a new Legislative Assembly of the Wisconsin Territory in October 1836.

== Leadership ==
The council elected a president for each session; four men held the position throughout the council's existence.

Presidents of the Council
Council	Years	President	County/ies Represented
1st	1824–1825	Abraham Edwards	Wayne
2nd	1826–1827	Abraham Edwards	Wayne
3rd	1828–1829	Abraham Edwards	Wayne
4th	1830–1831	Abraham Edwards	Lenawee, Monroe
5th	1832–1833	John McDonell	Wayne
6th	1834	John McDonell	Wayne
6th	1835	Morgan Lewis Martin	Brown, Chippewa, Crawford, Iowa, Michilimackinac
7th	1836	William S. Hamilton	Iowa
