= John McDonell (American politician) =

American judge & politician

Member of the Michigan Senate from the 1st district
- In office November 2, 1835 – March 23, 1838

Personal details
- Born: 1780
- Died: October 1, 1846 (aged 65–66)

John McDonell (1780 – October 1, 1846), also spelled McDonnell, was a Scottish–American judge and politician active in the U.S. state of Michigan. During the War of 1812, he helped pay the ransom of a number of prisoners held by Native Americans following the River Raisin Massacre. He served in the Michigan Senate in the early years of its existence.

== Biography ==
John McDonell was born in Scotland in 1780. His father was a supporter of the Stuart claim to the British throne, which made him unpopular with the government and prompted him to move his family to the United States in 1785. The family landed at Philadelphia, then moved to Albany, New York, where his father became a citizen and McDonell received his education. After a fire destroyed his father's business, McDonell was sent in 1798 to work as a clerk in his uncle's mercantile house in York, Canada. He started his own business in 1807, and moved to Detroit in 1809, though he retained property in Canada. He was naturalized as a U.S. citizen in 1810.

=== War of 1812 ===
During the War of 1812, McDonell raised a cavalry company on Canadian soil to fight on behalf of the Americans. Following the River Raisin Massacre, he paid the ransom of many prisoners that were brought to Detroit by their Native American captors. Among those whose freedom he purchased was a future congressman, Gustavus Bower.

In 1815, after the war, McDonell traveled to Sandwich, Ontario, (now Windsor) on business, and was arrested and imprisoned on charges of high treason against the British Government, for his actions on behalf of America during the war. He managed to escape, but a grand jury indicted him on the charges, and after he failed to appear for trial, he was declared an outlaw. Although the intercession of the American ambassador to Great Britain eventually led to the outlawry judgment being dropped in 1826, he had lost all of his property and outstanding business debts owed to him in Canada. He petitioned the U.S. Congress for compensation for these losses in 1834.

=== Political career ===
McDonell was appointed an associate judge in the county court in Wayne County on January 17, 1817, and served as chief justice of the court from January 13, 1830, until the court was abolished on April 15, 1833, when its business was transferred to the circuit courts. He was also appointed by the territorial governor to serve as an auctioneer in Detroit from 1817 to 1818.

McDonell was one of Wayne County's representatives on the Michigan Territorial Council from 1828 through 1835, and served as its president of the council in 1834. He was a delegate to the convention charged with drafting a state constitution in advance of Michigan's application for statehood, and also to the first Convention of Assent called to determine whether Michigan would accept the terms proposed by Congress for Michigan's statehood—taking the western part of the Upper Peninsula in exchange for a strip of land that had been the subject of the Toledo War with Ohio. After the convention rejected the proposal, people requested that Governor Stevens T. Mason call a second convention to reconsider; he refused, but declared that the people themselves could call for such a convention. McDonell was one of several Wayne County residents who signed a statement calling for such a convention, which eventually approved the proposal and removed the last obstacle to Michigan's statehood.

Following the adoption of the state constitution and the creation of the Michigan Legislature, McDonell represented Wayne County as the senator from the 1st District in the Michigan Senate from 1835 until his resignation on March 23, 1838. He also served as an alderman of the city of Detroit in 1837. From 1839 to 1841 he was the customs collector in Detroit. He served as a regent of the University of Michigan from 1835 to 1837.

McDonell died on October 1, 1846.
