= Michigan Territory =

Territory of the US, 1805–1837

Territory of Michigan
- Organized incorporated territory of the United States
- 1805–1837
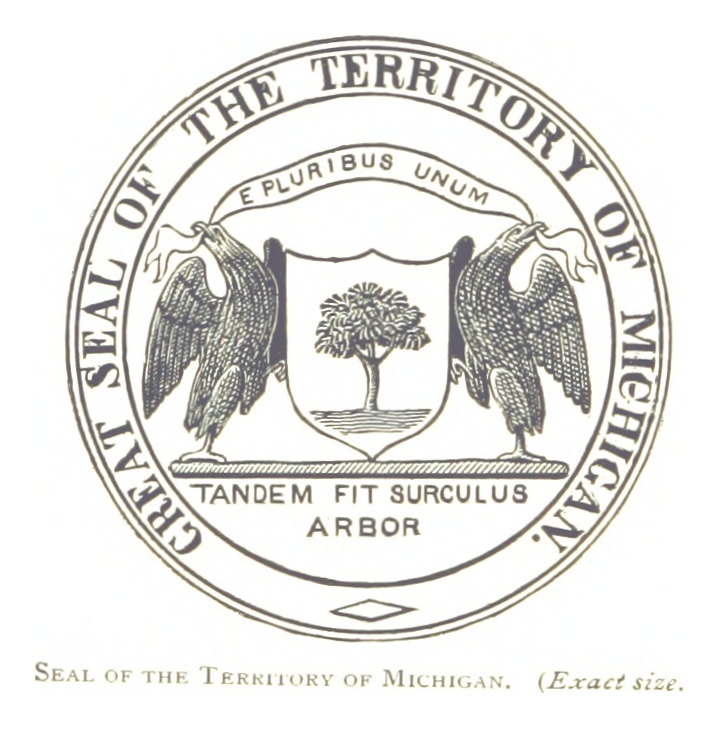
- Territorial seal

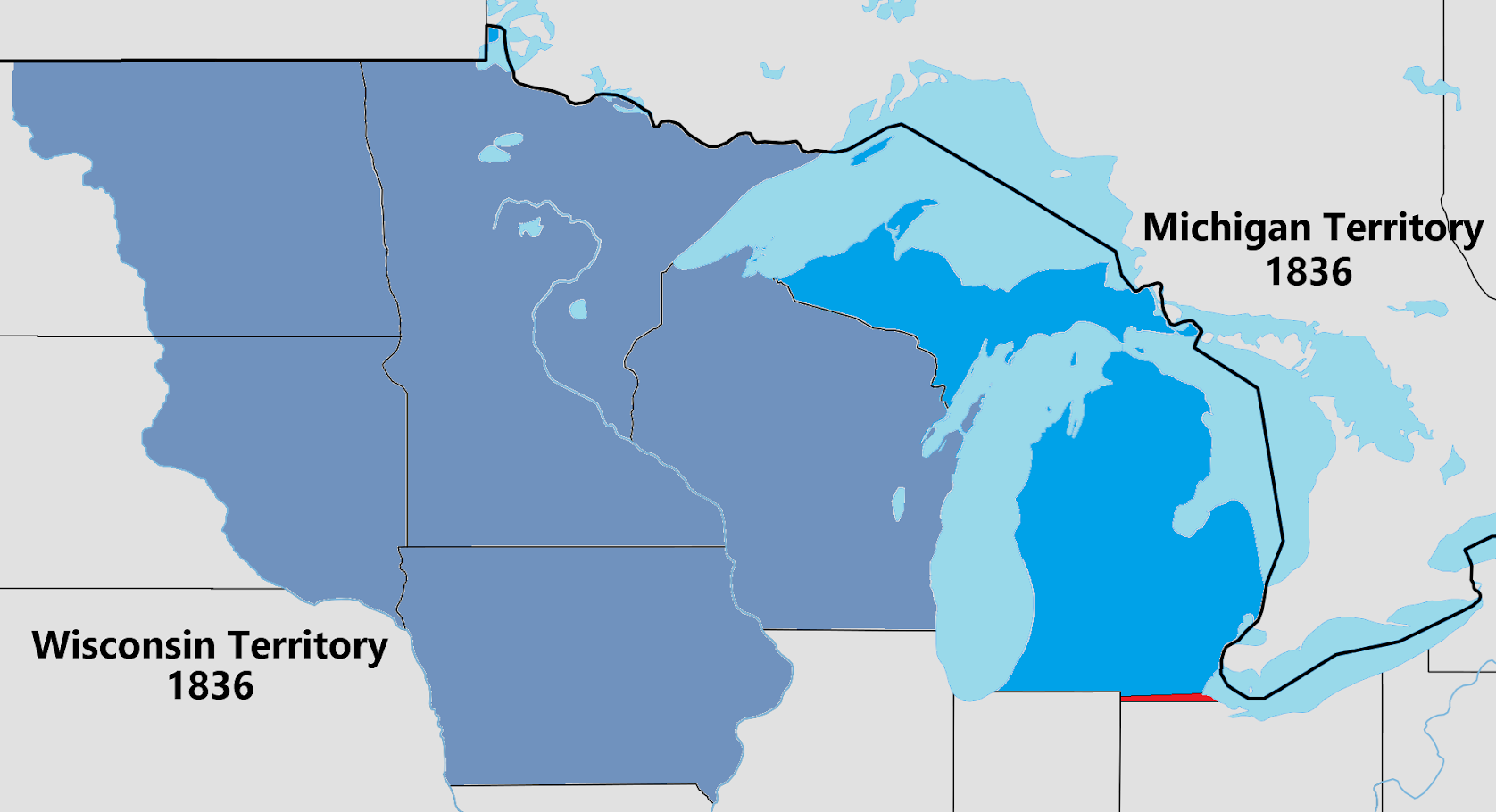
- The combined slate and blue areas formed the Michigan Territory at its greatest extent in 1833. In 1836, the slate area (renamed, Wisconsin Territory) was separated from the Michigan Territory in preparation for Michigan statehood in 1837. Disputed territory between Michigan and Ohio in red.
- Capital: Detroit
- Government
  - Type: Organized incorporated territory
- Governor
  - 1805–13: William Hull
  - 1813–31: Lewis Cass
  - 1831–32: Stevens T. Mason (acting)
  - 1832–34: George B. Porter
  - 1834–35: Stevens T. Mason (acting)
  - 1835–37: John S. Horner (governing from Wisconsin on land not to be included in the Michiganian state)
- Legislature: Governor and judges (1805–1824); Legislative Council of the Territory of Michigan (1824-1835)
- History
  - Organic Act effective: June 30 1805
  - Statehood of Michigan: January 26 1837
Preceded by	Succeeded by
Indiana Territory	Michigan; Wisconsin Territory

The Territory of Michigan was an organized incorporated territory of the United States from the remnant of Wayne County of the Northwest Territory that existed from June 30, 1805, until January 26, 1837, when the final extent of the territory was admitted to the Union as the State of Michigan. Detroit was the territorial capital.

== History and government ==
The earliest European explorers of Michigan saw it mostly as a place to control the fur trade. Small military forces, Jesuit missions to Native American tribes, and isolated settlements of trappers and traders accounted for most of the non-native inhabitants of what would become Michigan.

=== Early government ===
After the arrival of Europeans, the area was first under French and then British control. The first Jesuit mission, in 1668 at Sault Saint Marie, led to the establishment of further outposts at St. Ignace (where a mission began work in 1671) and Detroit, first occupied in 1701 by the garrison of Fort de Buade in St. Ignace, under the leadership of Antoine de la Mothe Cadillac. His troops erected Fort Pontchartrain du Détroit and the Sainte-Anne-de-Détroit church. As part of New France, the upper Great Lakes had first been governed from Michilimackinac, then Detroit; this was essentially a military regime that reported to the governor-general at Quebec. Its role was to supply the needs of the fur traders and discourage any settlements not directly supportive of that effort. After the surrender of Montreal in 1760, British troops under Robert Rogers occupied Detroit and its dependent posts. In 1763, Pontiac's Rebellion saw the fall of Fort Michilimackinac to the northern tribes and a lengthy siege of Fort Detroit. The siege was lifted in 1764, and Detroit was ruled under a British lieutenant-governor thereafter.

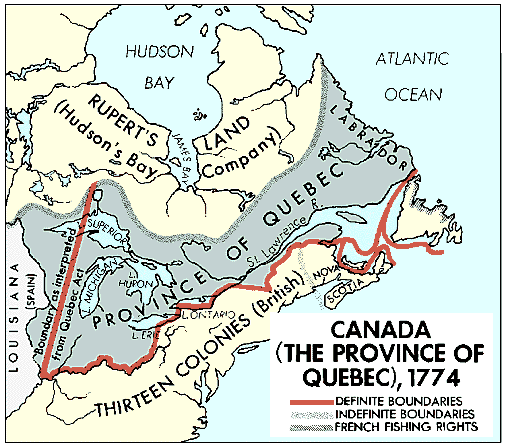
The Province of Quebec in 1774

Following the Quebec Act of 1774, Michigan was governed during the American Revolution as part of the Province of Quebec. Although the 1783 Treaty of Paris gave the fledgling United States a claim to the territory, British policy was to hold on to Detroit and its dependencies at all costs. In 1784, Baron von Steuben was sent to Canada by the Congress of the Confederation in a diplomatic capacity to address the question of Detroit and the Great Lakes, but Governor of Quebec Frederick Haldimand refused to provide a passport, and negotiations collapsed before they had begun. Starting in 1784, the British administered their Michigan holdings as part of the District of Hesse; in 1791 the Province of Quebec was split into Lower Canada (today's Province of Quebec) and Upper Canada (Ontario), and the districts of Upper Canada were renamed the next year, with the Hesse District designated as the Western District.

In addition to the British remaining in the region, several states held competing claims on the territory. In 1779, Virginia established Illinois County with boundaries that encompassed all of the land east of the Mississippi River, north of the Ohio River, and west of the Appalachian Mountains. For all practical purposes, however, the county government never exercised actual control beyond an area limited to a few old French settlements along the major rivers. The overwhelming majority of the northwestern lands were controlled by the native tribes. New York, Connecticut, and Massachusetts also claimed portions of the Great Lakes region but were even less able to enforce their pretensions, given Britain's control of the Great Lakes and the hostility of the tribes.

Virginia surrendered its claim to lands north and west of the Ohio River effective March 1, 1784. On the same day the findings were reported of a congressional committee on the western lands which had been chaired by Thomas Jefferson since the previous October. Jefferson's recommendations became the basis for the Land Ordinance of 1784, which established that new states equal in all respects to the founding thirteen would be erected in the territory, that they would forever be a part of the United States, and that their governments would be republican in form. The Land Ordinance of 1785 established a procedure for land sales in the territory. However, the Ohio River remained an effective boundary between the United States and the northwest tribes for a few more years.

The other states with claims in the northwest eventually followed Virginia's example, and in 1787 the Congress of the Confederation enacted the Northwest Ordinance which created the Northwest Territory. The first settlement under the Northwest Ordinance was at Marietta (Ohio) in 1788.

The region that became Michigan was initially unorganized territory and essentially remained under British control; that did not stop Arthur St. Clair, the first governor of the Northwest Territory, from establishing a structure of government for the area, if only on paper. Knox County was established on June 20, 1790, with boundaries that included the western half of the Lower Peninsula of Michigan and roughly the middle third of the Upper Peninsula of Michigan. In 1792, the boundaries of Hamilton County were expanded to include the eastern portions of Michigan not included in Knox County.

American claims to Michigan were frustrated by Britain's refusal to evacuate the forts at Detroit, Mackinac and elsewhere. Britain's tacit support for the northwest tribes during the Northwest Indian War was dependent on Detroit remaining out of American hands. But the position of the British and their allies in the northwest deteriorated after the signing of Jay's Treaty and the Battle of Fallen Timbers in 1794, and after negotiations the British evacuated Detroit on July 11, 1796. The United States had finally established a presence in Michigan. Fort Mackinac was turned over soon after, but Drummond Island remained as part of Canada until 1828.

=== Beginnings of American rule ===
By proclamation of acting governor and territorial secretary Winthrop Sargent, the "first" Wayne County was established from Knox and Hamilton counties on August 15, 1796, and included most of the area that later became the Michigan Territory, as well as portions of what are now Ohio and Indiana.

In 1800, the western half of the Lower Peninsula and most of the Upper Peninsula were attached to the Indiana Territory when it was established as a separate government from the Northwest Territory. Wayne County was thereby reduced to the remainder of the two peninsulas and continued under the government of the Northwest Territory. St. Clair County, another Indiana Territory county, was also expanded to include the western portion of the Upper Peninsula and a small sliver of the Lower Peninsula along the shore of Lake Michigan.

When Ohio was admitted as a state in early 1803, the eastern half of Michigan was incorporated into the Indiana Territory. One of the first acts taken that year by the Indiana government under William Henry Harrison was to reorganize Wayne County under Indiana law, adding territory from Knox and St. Clair counties to encompass all the Lower Peninsula, much of the Upper Peninsula, and those portions of today's Illinois, Indiana, and Wisconsin that drained into Lake Michigan. In many respects, the change from the government of the Northwest Territory to that of the Indiana Territory had little effect on Wayne County's limited operations. By Governor Harrison's proclamation of January 11, 1803, the courts of Wayne County—common pleas, orphans, and quarter sessions—kept their organization under the new territorial government, with almost identical composition.

But the logistics of government went from difficult to almost impossible, with the mail between Detroit and the capital at Vincennes being routed at one point through Warren in northeastern Ohio. The deciding factor may have come when an election was called by Harrison for September 11, 1804, to decide whether Indiana Territory (which by this time was responsible for the settlements in Michigan, Wisconsin and Illinois, as well as the newly acquired District of Louisiana) should progress to the second stage of territorial government. But word failed to reach Detroit until after the date had passed, and the settlers of Michigan petitioned Congress in December 1804, asking that Wayne County be set as an independent territory.

=== Organization ===
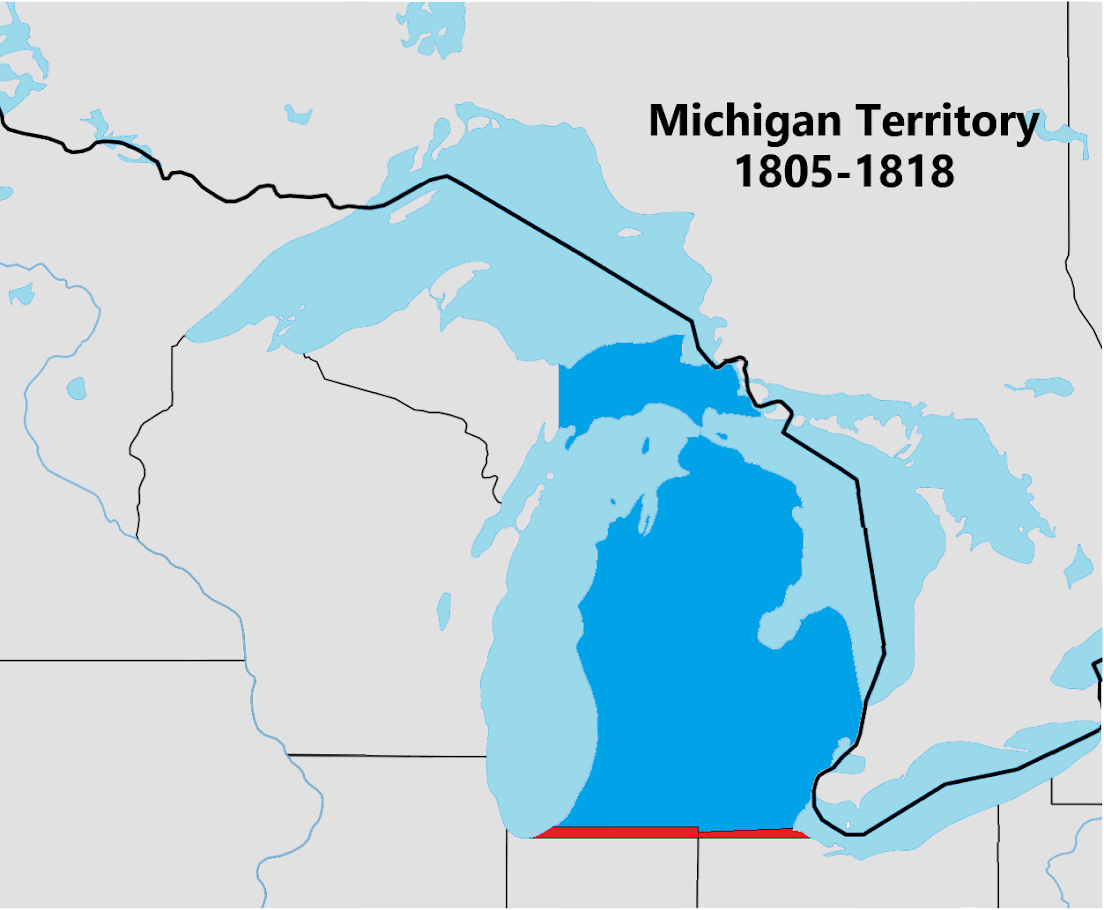
From 1805 to 1818, the western border was a line through Lake Michigan. Disputed territory in red.

Michigan Territory was established by an act of the United States Congress on January 11, 1805, effective June 30 of that year. The act defined the territory as "all that part of the Indiana Territory, which lies North of a line drawn east from the southerly bend or extreme of lake Michigan, until it shall intersect lake Erie, and East of a line drawn from the said southerly bend through the middle of said lake to its northern extremity, and thence due north to the northern boundary of the United States." A historical marker at a roadside park, approximately three miles east of Naubinway at 46°05′50″N 85°23′51″W, commemorates the northernmost point of Lake Michigan, which is located approximately one mile west of the park.

The first territorial governor, William Hull, abolished Wayne County and established districts of his own making, which proved to be short-lived. Lewis Cass became governor in 1813 and promptly undid Hull's work and re-established a third incarnation of Wayne County that included all lands within Michigan Territory that had been ceded by Indians through the 1807 Treaty of Detroit.

British occupation of the Michigan Territory, from 1812 to 1813.

During the War of 1812, following General Isaac Brock's capture of Detroit on August 16, 1812, the British Michigan Territory was at least nominally a part of the Province of Upper Canada. On August 24, Colonel Henry Proctor proclaimed the continuation of civil government under existing laws with Proctor acting as Governor and Chief Justice Augustus B. Woodward as acting Secretary. On February 4, 1813, Proctor suspended civil government and imposed martial law.

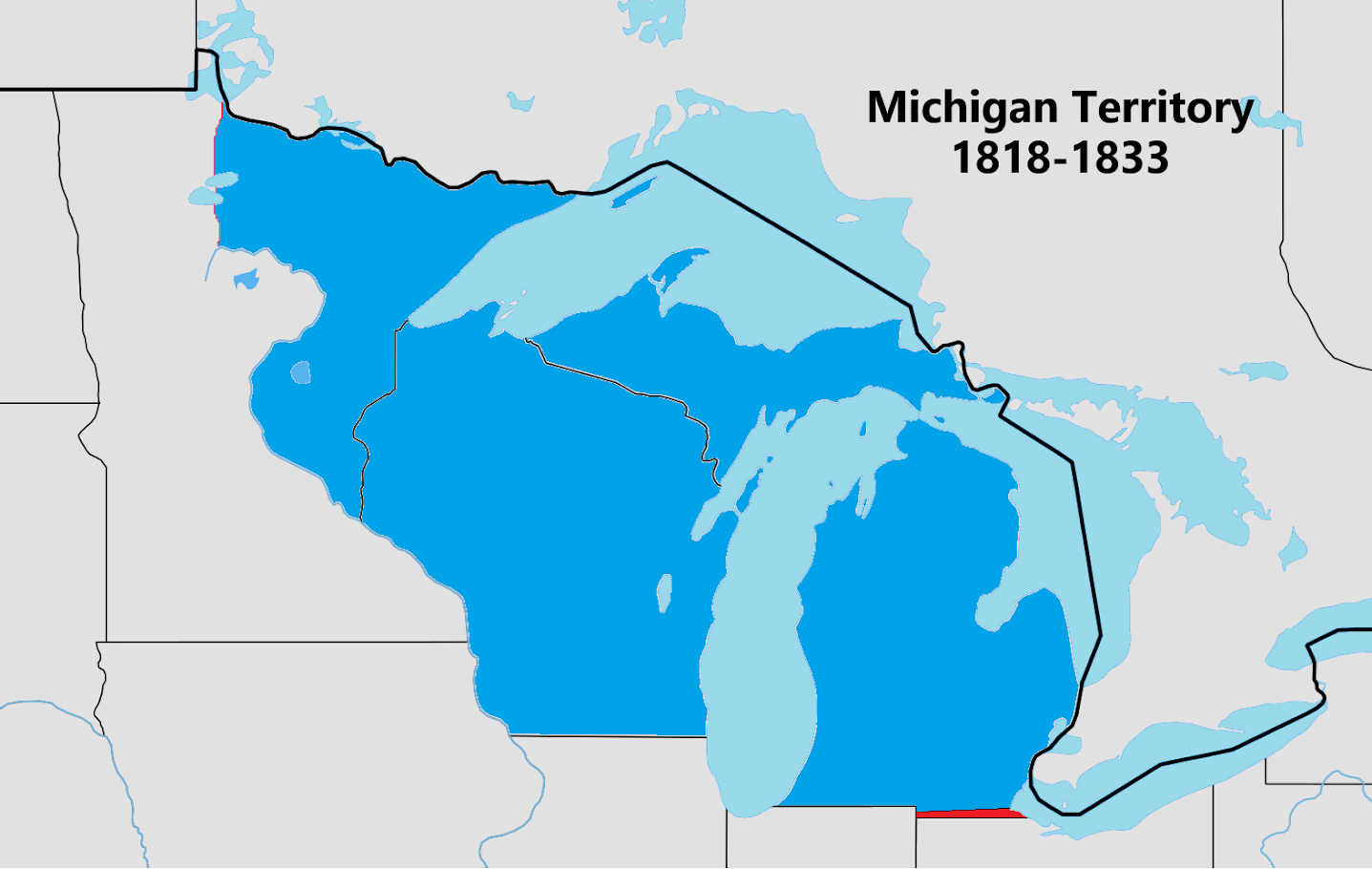
By 1818, both Illinois and Indiana had been admitted as states; the unincorporated land from their territories was made part of the Michigan Territory; and a strip of land in southern Michigan was given to Indiana. Disputed territory in red.

When Indiana (1816) and Illinois (1818) joined the Union, remnants of their territories were joined to Michigan Territory. An area equal to 30 townships was transferred from Michigan Territory to Indiana to allow that state access to Lake Michigan. Soon afterward, the federal government rapidly began signing treaties with local Native American tribes and acquiring their lands.

In 1818, a general assembly referendum was held to determine whether a majority of the territory's freeholders favored the creation of a general legislative assembly to replace the system of governors and judges in effect at the time, as provided for by the Northwest Ordinance. The election was called by Cass, and results showed a majority opposed changing the system of government.

In 1824, the Michigan Territory graduated to the second grade of territorial status, and the government's power was transferred from the governor and a handful of judges to the people. The people elected 18 to the Legislative Council, of which nine were approved by President James Monroe, and it first sat in council on June 7, 1824. This council was expanded to 13 member in 1825, with the 13 being chosen by Monroe. The Erie Canal opened in 1825, allowing settlers from New England and New York to reach Michigan by water through Albany and Buffalo.

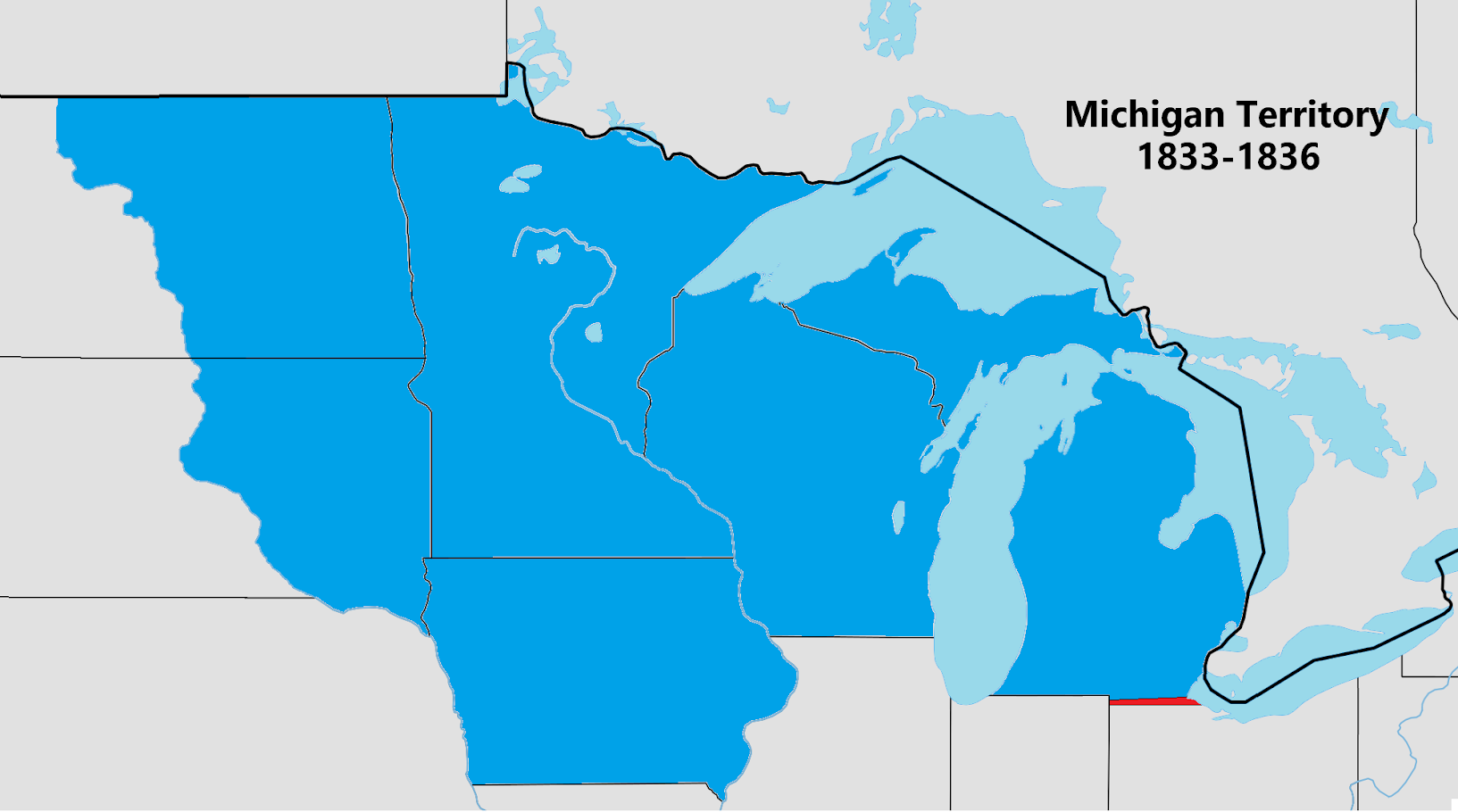
Between 1833 and 1836, all the remnants of the old Northwest Territory were part of the Michigan Territory along with portions of the Louisiana Purchase. Disputed territory in red.

In 1834, all the lands acquired in the Louisiana Purchase that were as yet unallocated and lay east of the Missouri River (generally, the Dakotas, Iowa and the western half of Minnesota) were attached to the Michigan Territory, an area that was officially characterized as "north of Missouri and east of the Missouri and White Earth Rivers." At this point, Michigan Territory included what is now the states of Michigan, Wisconsin, Iowa, Minnesota and a large portion of the Dakotas.

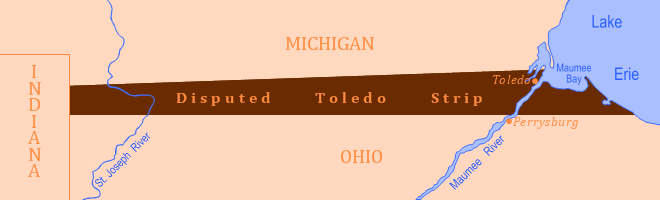
The disputed portion of Michigan Territory, referred to as the Toledo Strip

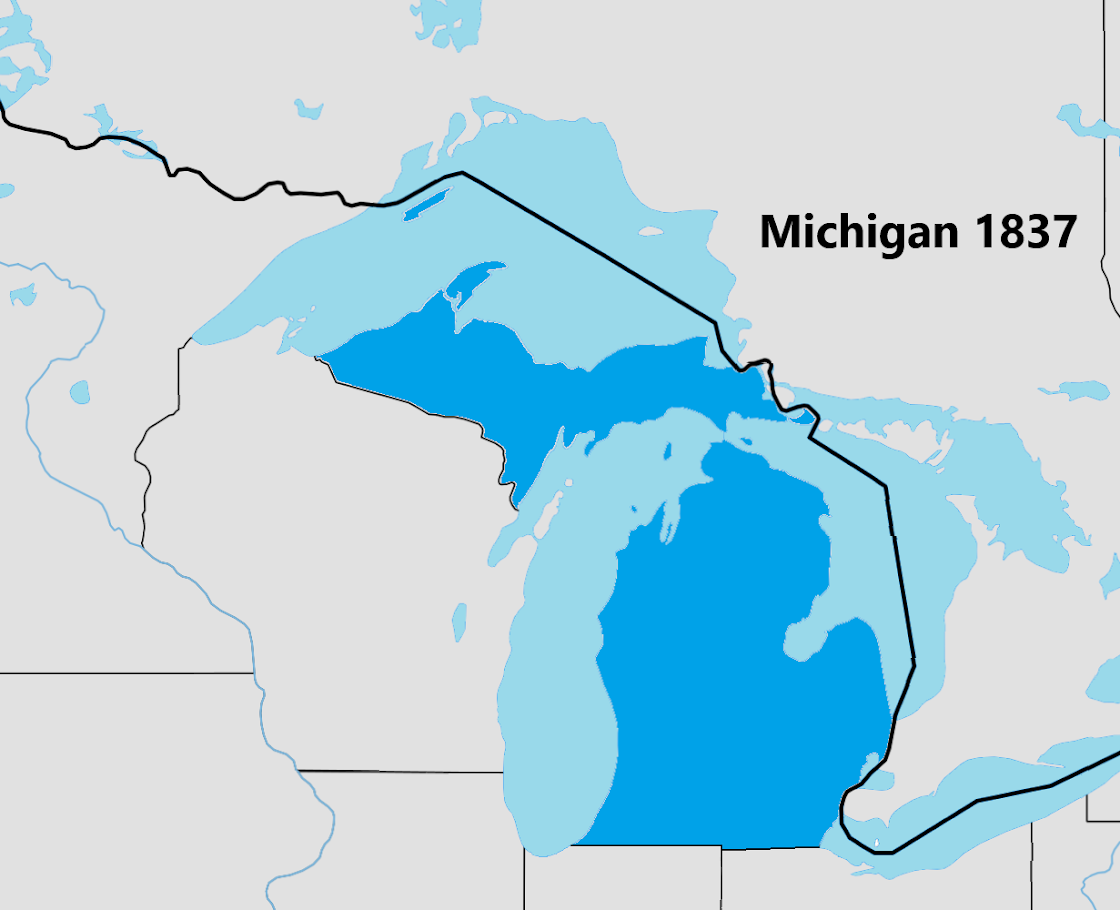
Michigan became a state when it agreed to the boundaries dictated by Congress, giving up its claim to the Toledo Strip, and accepted the western portion of the Upper Peninsula.

Meanwhile, in 1835 the Toledo War was fought with Ohio because Michigan Territory wanted to retain the disputed "Toledo Strip." The Toledo area of Ohio was finally surrendered in exchange for the western section of the Upper Peninsula of Michigan.

Slavery was forbidden in the territory under the Northwest Ordinance, but British and French residents in Michigan were permitted to retain possession of slaves already owned at the time the territory became organized. Census records show that the slave population in the territory numbered 24 in 1810 and 32 in 1830. It is believed that those counted as slaves were, in many cases, Indians rather than blacks.

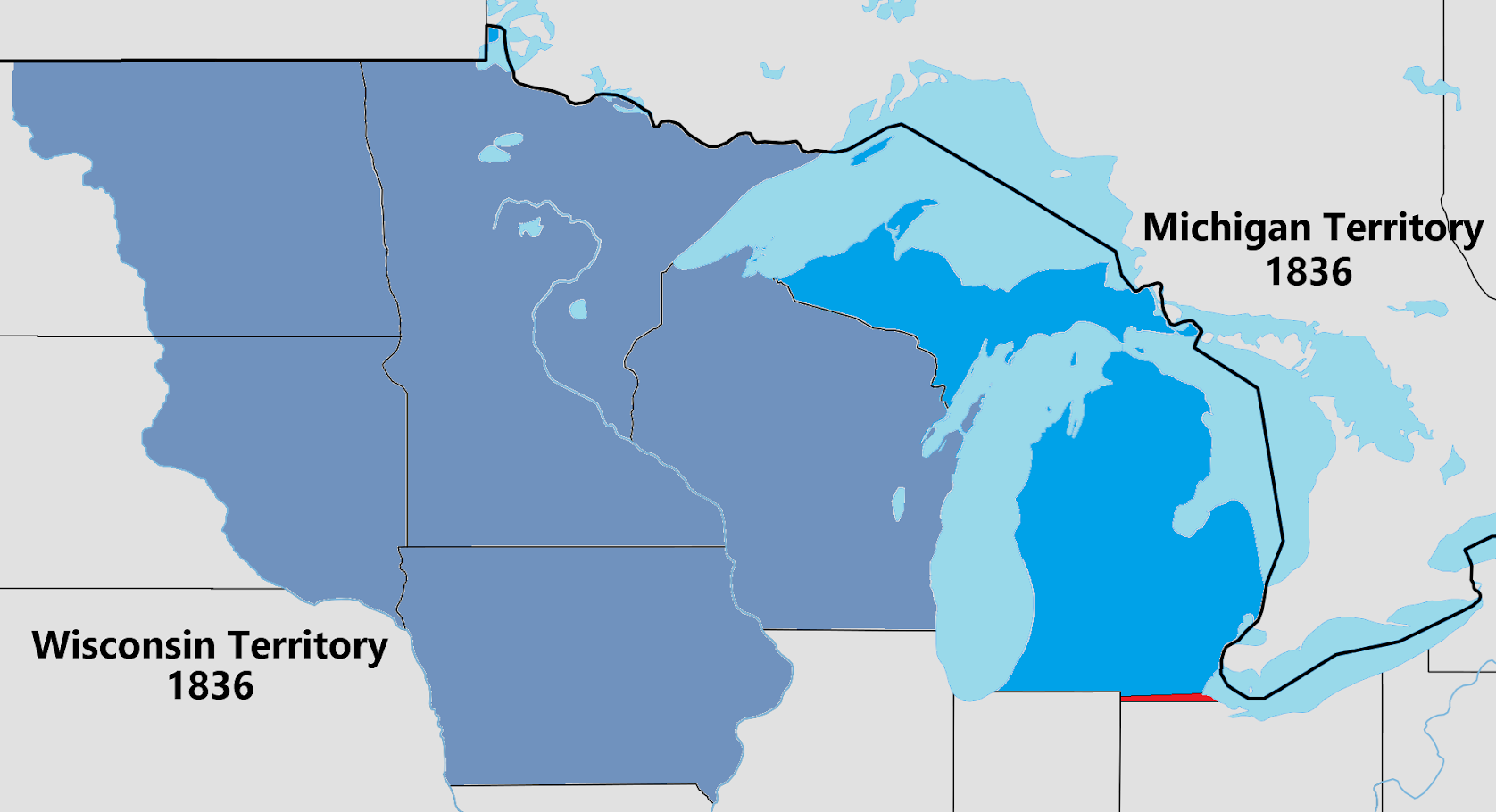
Michigan shrank in 1836 with the creation of the Wisconsin Territory. Wisconsin Territory was established in 1836 with the present boundary in the Upper Peninsula. Disputed territory in red.

On July 3, 1836, in preparation for Michigan statehood, the Wisconsin Territory was organized from Michigan Territory, consisting of the present states of Wisconsin, Minnesota, Iowa and the eastern portion of the Dakotas. Michigan became a state on January 26, 1837, and included the Upper Peninsula as part of the resolution to the conflict over the Toledo Strip, which had blocked Michigan statehood for several years. The western border of the Upper Peninsula was marked at the Montreal River on the Lake Superior shoreline and the Menominee River on the coast of Lake Michigan. Detroit remained the capital until March 17, 1847 when Lansing was chosen as a replacement. The population of Michigan at the time of statehood is estimated to have been about 200,000, which was well above the Northwest Ordinance's minimum requirement of 60,000.

== Acquisitions ==
The area that became Michigan had been British territory and was ceded to the United States in 1783, although the native peoples of the area had not ceded control to either the British or Americans for most of the territory by 1783. The majority of it was gained by cession, coerced or otherwise. The people who resided in Michigan before American settlement were the Ottawa, the Potawatomi, Ojibwa and the Wyandot. Treaties ceding the land were signed between 1795 (the Treaty of Greenville) and 1842 (the Treaty of La Pointe). Other notable treaties were Governor Hull's treaty of 1808, the Treaty of Saginaw in 1819, the two Treaties of Chicago (1821 and 1833), the Carey Mission in 1828 and the Treaty of Washington in 1836 and a later treaty of January 14, 1837.

== Subdivisions ==
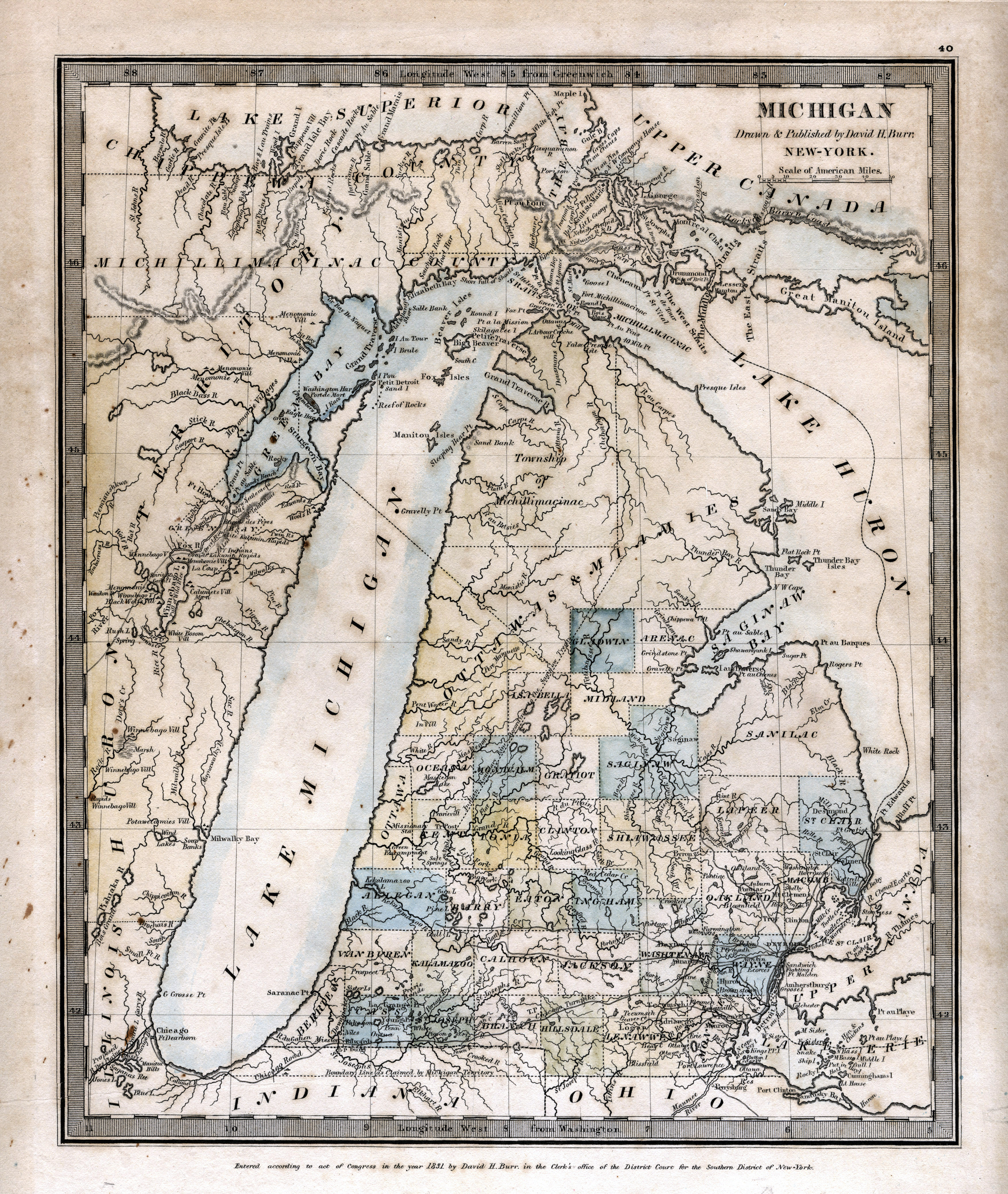
An 1831 map of Michigan by David H. Burr, showing boundaries of early counties

Wayne County, Michigan, originally part of the vast Northwest Territory, was eventually whittled down into its current size by the separation of several tracts: Monroe in 1817; Michilimackinac County (later called Mackinac) and Macomb counties in 1818; St. Clair and St. Joseph counties in 1820; and Washtenaw County in 1822. The first township organization was Detroit in Wayne County in 1802.

Also organized in 1818 were two counties that survive in present-day Wisconsin. Crawford was set up to govern the settlements on the upper Mississippi River from its seat at Prairie du Chien, Wisconsin, while Brown performed a similar function for the settlements around Green Bay. These became part of the Wisconsin Territory in 1836.

Oakland County, Michigan was created in 1819 and over time was subdivided into all or parts of Genesee, Lapeer, Sanilac, Shiawassee and Saginaw counties. Saginaw County was split further into eight separate counties, three of which (Isabella, Arenac and Midland) were established during the territorial period. Lenawee County was created in 1822 from what had been Native American lands, and Hillsdale County was separated from it in 1829. Other parts of Lenawee were turned into Cass and Berrien. Branch also sprung fully formed from Michigan Territory in 1829. Chippewa County was created from Michilimackinac County in 1826. Kalamazoo County, established 1829 from St. Joseph County, was the dominant tract in Western Michigan and was divided and subdivided into many other counties: Allegan, Barry, Calhoun, Eaton, Ionia, Montcalm, Kent, Ottawa and Clinton (some created during the territorial period, others split off later). Jackson and Ingham were created in 1829 from Washtenaw; Isabella was created from parts of Saginaw and Midland counties in 1831. Gratiot County was also established in 1831, with land from Saginaw and Clinton counties. Seven of the 12 counties created in 1829 were named for members of President Andrew Jackson's Cabinet, and one was named for Jackson. Iowa County, with its seat at Mineral Point, was established in 1829 and transferred to the Wisconsin Territory in 1836.

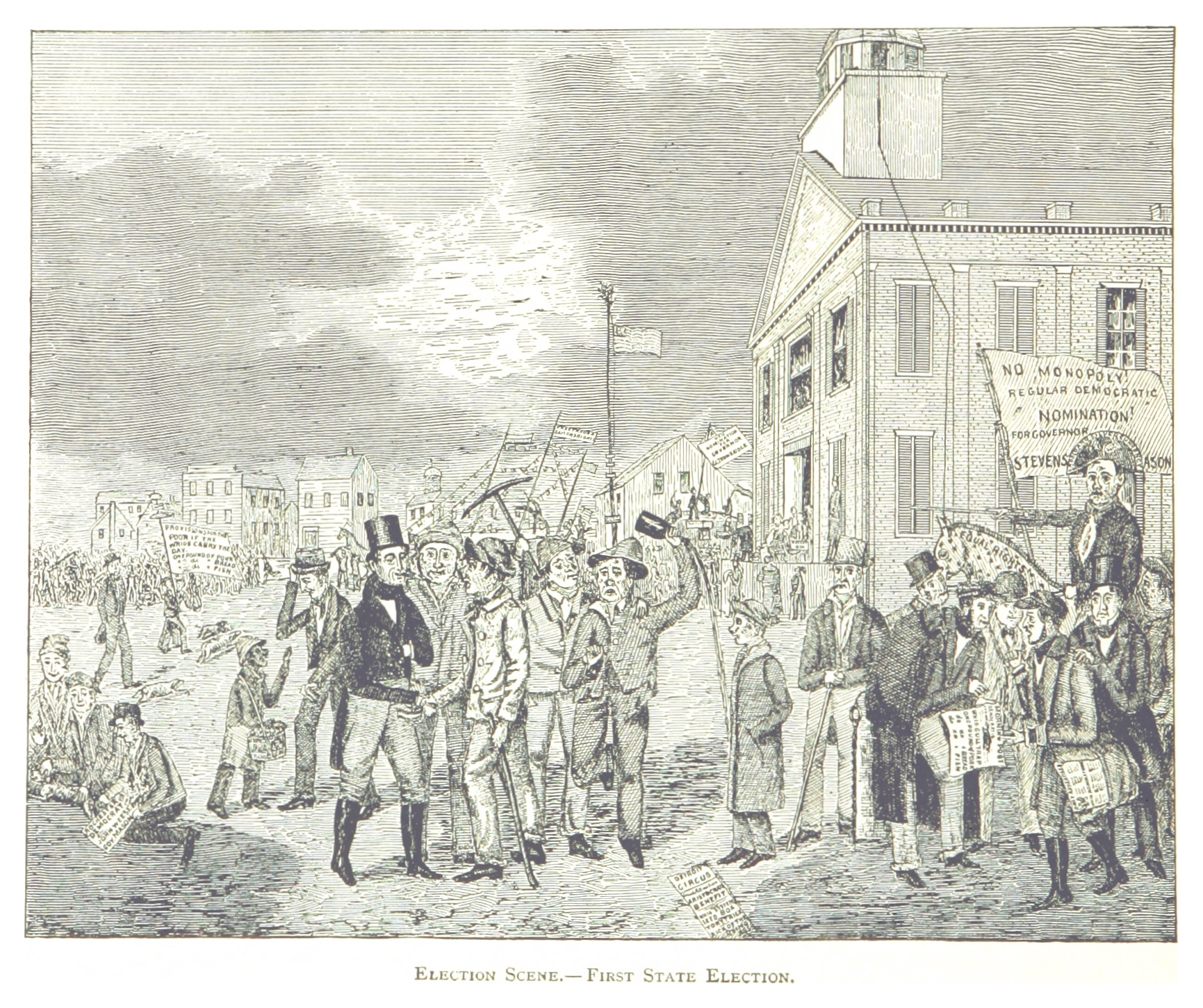
Stevens T. Mason ran for governor in the first state elections in 1835.

Michigan Territory briefly governed lands west of the Mississippi, after the statehood of Missouri left the area north of Missouri as unorganized territory; this comprised what is now Iowa and that part of Minnesota west of the river. Such was the case until 1834, when that area was placed under the government of Michigan Territory. Dubuque and Des Moines counties were created in 1834, and transferred to the Wisconsin Territory in 1836 upon its organization. Milwaukee County was established in 1834 and was also transferred to Wisconsin Territory two years later.

== Population ==
Historical population
Year	Pop.	±%
1810	4,762	—
1820	8,896	+86.8%
1830	31,639	+255.7%
Source: 1810–1830 (includes only Michigan and Wisconsin)

These census numbers do not include most Native Americans, defined in the U.S. Constitution as "Indians not taxed" (Article I, Sec. 2). Under the Northwest Ordinance, a territory could apply for statehood once it had surpassed 60,000 inhabitants.

The 1830 United States census reports the following population counts for 13 counties in present-day Michigan and 3 in Wisconsin. The boundaries of counties at that time differed significantly from present-day boundaries. The 1810 United States census is reported in terms of four Civil Districts of a single Wayne County: Michilimackinac, Detroit, Erie, and Huron. The 1810 population shown in the table for Mackinac County is that reported for Michilimackinac Civil District, for Macomb County that reported for Huron Civil District. For Monroe County that reported for Erie Civil District, and for Wayne County that reported for Detroit Civil District.

1830 Rank	County	1810 Population	1830 Population
1	Wayne	2,227	6,781
2	Oakland	–	4,911
3	Washtenaw	–	4,042
4	Monroe	1,340	3,187
5	Macomb	580	2,413
6	Iowa	–	1,587
7	Lenawee	–	1,491
8	Brown	–	1,356
9	St. Joseph	–	1,313
10	St. Clair	–	1,114
11	Cass	–	919
12	Michilimackinac	615	877
13	Crawford	–	692
14	Chippewa	–	626
15	Berrien	–	325
16	Van Buren	–	5
	Michigan Territory	4,762	31,639

== Officers ==
=== Governors ===
Governor	Dates Served	Notes
William Hull	March 1, 1805 to August 16, 1812	Surrendered Detroit to British forces, August 16, 1812
Henry Proctor	August 24, 1812 to September 28, 1813	Civil governor of the British Michigan Territory to February 4; martial law thereafter until evacuation of Detroit in September
Lewis Cass	October 13, 1813 to August 6, 1831	Appointed military governor by General Harrison; civil governor from October 29
George Bryan Porter	August 6, 1831 to July 6, 1834	Died in office.
Stevens T. Mason	July 6, 1834 to September 15, 1835	ex officio, Acting Governor due to position as Secretary
John S. Horner	September 15, 1835 to July 3, 1836	ex officio, Acting Governor due to position as Secretary

=== Secretaries ===
Secretary	Dates Served
Stanley Griswold	March 1, 1805 to March 18, 1808
Reuben Atwater	March 18, 1808 to October 15, 1814
William Woodbridge	October 15, 1814 to January 15, 1828
James Witherell	January 15, 1828 to May 20, 1830
John T. Mason	May 20, 1830 to July 12, 1831
Stevens T. Mason	July 12, 1831 to September 15, 1835
John S. Horner	September 15, 1835 to July 3, 1836

=== Supreme Court ===
From 1805 through 1823, Territorial Supreme Court justices were appointed by the U.S. president, with consent of the U.S. Senate. Their terms had no fixed limits. In 1823, the U.S. Congress passed an act reorganizing territorial government and setting a four-year term of office for justices.

Supreme Court Justices	Dates Served	Notes
Augustus B. Woodward	March 2, 1805 to February 1, 1824	Appointed by Thomas Jefferson; resigned following reorganization of court
Frederick Bates	March 3, 1805 to November 1808	Appointed by Thomas Jefferson; resigned after being appointed Secretary of Louisiana Territory
John Griffin	December 23, 1805 to February 1, 1824	Appointed by Thomas Jefferson; resigned following reorganization of court
James Witherell	April 23, 1808 to January 15, 1828	First appointed by Thomas Jefferson; reappointed by James Monroe; resigned after being appointed Secretary of Michigan Territory
Solomon Sibley	February 2, 1824 to July 17, 1836	First appointed by James Monroe, reappointed by John Quincy Adams and Andrew Jackson; not reappointed after Michigan statehood
John Hunt	February 20, 1824 to June 15, 1827	Twice appointed by James Monroe; died in office
Henry C. Chipman	July 18, 1817 to April 25, 1832	Twice appointed by John Quincy Adams; was not reappointed by Andrew Jackson
William Woodbridge	January 15, 1828 to April 25, 1832	Appointed by John Quincy Adams; was not reappointed by Andrew Jackson
Ross Wilkins	April 26, 1832 to July 17, 1836	Appointed by Andrew Jackson; appointed U.S. District Court judge for Michigan after statehood
George Morell	April 26, 1832 to July 17, 1843	First appointed by Andrew Jackson; appointed to the Michigan Supreme Court by Governor Mason

== Congressional delegates ==
In 1819, Michigan Territory was given the authority to elect a congressional delegate.

Delegate	Years	Party
William Woodbridge	1819–1820 (16th Congress)	Democratic-Republican
Solomon Sibley	1820–1823 (16th and 17th Congresses)	Federalist
Gabriel Richard	1823–1825 (18th Congress)	Independent
Austin Eli Wing	1825–1829 (19th and 20th Congresses)	Anti-Jacksonian
John Biddle	1829–1831 (21st Congress)	Jacksonian
Austin Eli Wing	1831–1833 (22nd Congress)	Anti-Jacksonian
Lucius Lyon	1833–1835 (23rd Congress)	Jacksonian
George Wallace Jones	1835–1837 (24th Congress)	Jacksonian

== See also ==
- Historic regions of the United States
- History of Michigan
- Michigan Territory Militia
- British occupation of the Michigan Territory
- Territorial evolution of the United States
- Territorial Road (Michigan)
- U.S. territories
