= 2024 in British television =

This is a list of events that took place in 2024 relating to television in the United Kingdom.

== Events ==
=== January ===
Date	Event
1	BBC One sees in the New Year with the concert Rick Astley Rocks New Year's Eve. Rick Astley is joined by various guests, including Rylan Clark-Neal with whom he performs a rendition of the Dead or Alive track "You Spin Me Round (Like a Record)".
1	STV's Bringing in the Bells is hosted by Alex Norton, Blythe Duff, Martin Compston and others to see in the New Year.
2	TV chef Simon Rimmer announces that Greens, a Manchester-based vegetarian restaurant of which he is co-owner, is closing with immediate effect after 33 years.
2	The running times of BBC Breakfast and Morning Live are extended. BBC Breakfast runs until 9.30 with Morning Live airtime extended to 75 minutes, giving that programme a transmission slot of 9.30 to 10.45.
3	Former Chancellor of the Exchequer Nadhim Zahawi makes a guest appearance in the ITV drama Mr Bates vs The Post Office as himself, questioning Post Office chief executive Paula Vennells in a 2015 House of Commons committee inquiry into the Horizon computer system.
3	That's TV 2 begins airing episodes of Prisoner: Cell Block H.
5	ITV criticises ex-footballer Joey Barton after he likened Eni Aluko and Lucy Ward, who were commentating on a football match the previous evening, to serial killers Fred and Rose West. ITV describes the remarks on X as "vindictive".
5	Lawyers representing potential victims of the British Post Office scandal say they have been contacted by a further 50 people following the broadcast of the four-episode series ITV drama Mr Bates vs The Post Office.
8	Ofcom delays the publication of research into politicians presenting news programmes until it has ruled on investigations open into GB News.
8	The BBC wins the free to air rights to rugby league's Super League and World Club Challenge, beating Channel 4. The rights are on a three-year contract, and matches will be shown on BBC Two, BBC Three and BBC iPlayer.
8	The weekday editions of Sky News Breakfast are refreshed. The programme starts at the earlier time of 6am, and new presenters join the programme.
9	Provisional viewing figures indicate that 9.2 million people have watched the ITV drama Mr Bates vs the Post Office, making it the most watched programme of 2024 so far. Subsequent data, which includes catch-up, put the figure at 9.75m.
11	The Liberal Democrats ask Ofcom to investigate GB News over alleged bias in its coverage of the Post Office scandal, including what the party's deputy leader, Daisy Cooper, describes as "a fictitious monologue" Nigel Farage delivered about leader Sir Ed Davey, which she says contained "a number of factual inaccuracies".
13	Gladiators returns for its third run on BBC One and BBC iPlayer with Bradley Walsh and his son Barney presenting. The show was previously aired on ITV from 1992 to 2000 and Sky One from 2008 to 2009. The revival has attracted an audience of 6 million viewers, becoming the biggest entertainment launch for the BBC in seven years.
13	EastEnders confirms that Patsy Palmer is to briefly reprise her role as Bianca Jackson later in the year following her departure from the series in 2019.
14	Dancing on Ice returns for its sixteenth series on ITV with Stephen Mulhern and Holly Willoughby presenting, Mulhern having succeeded Phillip Schofield as co-presenter. Willoughby makes her return to television following her departure from This Morning.
14	Debut of Smooth Radio's new television advertising campaign featuring famous UK landmarks and its new strapline, "Always the best music", which launches in a commercial break during the opening edition of Dancing on Ice.
15	Love Island returns with an "All Stars" series, with the launch show episode being broadcast simultaneously on ITV1 and ITV2, featuring former contestants from the past ten series.
15	The BBC announces that Shini Muthukrishnan will become the 43rd presenter of Blue Peter.
15	Sky Showcase begins simulcasting selected programming from Sky Atlantic.
16	Rhodri Williams announces he has written to the UK government to ask them not to consider him for a second term as chairman of S4C following controversy at the TV channel.
17	The BBC has agreed a deal with insurance company Axa to sell its Elstree Studios, which includes the EastEnders set. The set will be leased back from Axa so that filming can continue there.
17	An error with the calculation of viewing figures that had given GB News a million viewers for its New Year's Eve coverage is corrected by BARB, and shows the channel actually had 33,000 viewers that evening.
18	Kim Medcalf makes an unannounced departure from the BBC soap opera EastEnders, two years after returning to the soap as the character Sam Mitchell.
22	The World launches on Sky News. The hour-long international news programme airs Monday to Thursday at 9pm and is part of Sky News' evening sequence of individually branded, and focussed, hour-long programmes.
22	The UK government announces plans to give Ofcom more powers over the BBC's online content, including BBC News.
22	The UK government rejects calls from Welsh MPs to add the Six Nations Championship to the list of guaranteed free-to-air sporting events on British television.
24	The 2024 Brit Award nominees are announced. Raye received the most nominations with seven in total, breaking the record for the most nominations received by a single artist in a year.
25	Campaigners for myalgic encephalomyelitis (ME) have criticised BBC One's Dragons' Den for promoting a product with "unfounded" claims after a businesswoman appeared on the show promoting a product she claimed had helped improve her ME. The episode is subsequently edited to include an onscreen message during the businesswoman's appearance.
26	Harry Clark wins series two of The Traitors.
29	Channel 4 announces the loss of 200 jobs as it seeks to slim down the organisation and focus on digital services.
30	The BBC releases around 3,000 emails relating to Martin Bashir's 1995 Panorama interview with Diana, Princess of Wales after a judge ordered their release.
30	Sky announces plans to cut 1,000 jobs in the UK during 2024 as it moves towards internet-based services.
30	ITV announces that Alison Hammond will replace Paul O'Grady as presenter of For the Love of Dogs.

=== February ===
Date	Event
2	Construction work begins on The Tea Factory, the BBC's new Birmingham & West Midland headquarters.
5	Kate Garraway makes her first television appearance since the death of her husband, Derek Draper, and gives an interview to Good Morning Britain.
8	Kate Garraway returns to her presenting role on Good Morning Britain, presenting alongside Ben Shephard.
8	TalkTV airs the final edition of Piers Morgan Uncensored to be shown regularly on the channel. In a subsequent interview with The Times, Morgan announces he is moving the show to his YouTube channel, where he can conduct longer and more in-depth interviews without the "unnecessary straitjacket" of television, and build a global following. TalkTV says some of Morgan's shows will continue to air on the channel.
8	ITV announces that 25 James Bond films will be made available through the ITVX platform from March.
10	ITV and Guinness trial live audio described commentary for blind and partially sighted viewers of the 2024 Six Nations match between England and Wales.
12	Prime Minister Rishi Sunak appears on an hour long GB News People's Forum, where a selected audience of undecided voters are invited to ask him questions. The programme is presented by Stephen Dixon.
13	The BBC announces the closure of the BBC iPlayer downloads service for desktop and laptop computers from 8 April; downloads will still be available for users of the BBC iPlayer app on mobile and tablet, and streaming remains possible on all devices.
13	The US entertainment website Deadline Hollywood reports that Gavin & Stacey will be returning for a 2024 Christmas special, five years after the last one. But there is some official announcement from BBC Studios.
15	The BBC confirms that Asif Munaf, a contestant on The Apprentice, will not appear on the spin-off show, The Apprentice: You're Fired, when he exits the show after posting antisemitic comments on social media.
16	BBC Four airs four editions of Top of the Pops that were presented by Steve Wright as a tribute to the disc jockey following the announcement of his death a few days earlier.
16	ITV confirms that Ben Shephard and Cat Deeley will be the new permanent presenters of This Morning following the departure of Holly Willoughby and Phillip Schofield in 2023.
18	The 2024 BAFTA Awards are held at London's Royal Festival Hall and presented by David Tennant.
19	Ofcom launches an impartiality investigation into GB News's Q&A session with prime minister Rishi Sunak.
19	Piers Morgan Uncensored begins airing regularly on Morgan's YouTube channel.
19	Molly Smith and Tom Clare win the first series of Love Island All Stars. Overnight viewing figures from BARB estimate the finale, aired on ITV2, is viewed by an audience of just over a million, while ITV says that with catch-up viewing the total figure is 1.3 million.
20	The BBC announces plans to reshape the BBC Scotland TV channel, including axing the hour-long news programme The Nine and replacing it with a 30-minute programme.
20	Idles singer Joe Talbot becomes the latest celebrity to appear on CBeebies Bedtime Stories, where he reads Under The Love Umbrella by Davina Bell.
21	Maryam Moshiri relaunches The World Today at 7pm as an evening programme on BBC News.
21	McFly band members Tom Fletcher and Danny Jones will share a chair on the judging panel of The Voice UK when the series returns. US country singer LeAnn Rimes will also join the panel, alongside Sir Tom Jones and Will.i.am.
21	The Metropolitan Police says it would take further action over allegations that Dan Wootton offered to pay colleagues for sexually explicit pictures of themselves.
23	Ben Shephard presents his final edition of Good Morning Britain ahead of his new role co-presenting This Morning.
24	Lee Anderson is suspended from the Conservative Party after "refusing to apologise" for claiming "Islamists" had "got control" of London Mayor Sadiq Khan during an edition of his GB News show the previous day.
27	The BBC apologises for the way it dealt with a complaint about the newsreader Huw Edwards, saying the issue was not escalated quickly enough.
27	Comedian Jason Manford is to join the cast of Waterloo Road when the series returns later in the year.

=== March ===
Date	Event
1	The final day of recording of Doctors takes place at the BBC's Birmingham & West Midland studios; the series along with Classic Doctors is scheduled to end in December after nearly 5,000 episodes.
4	Following its investigation into the episode of GB News's Dan Wootton Tonight during which Laurence Fox made comments about journalist Ava Evans, Ofcom concludes that the programme was in breach of its regulations. The watchdog says the comments "constituted a highly personal attack on Ms Evans and were potentially highly offensive to viewers", and says that it has "significant concerns about GB News' editorial control of its live output" and is requiring it "provide further detailed information about its compliance practices in this area".
4	Celebrity Big Brother returns to British television after a six-year break for a twenty-third series. Housemates include Gary Goldsmith, the uncle of Catherine, Princess of Wales.
5	News UK announces plans to close TalkTV in the summer, with its content switching to online format. TalkRadio will continue unaffected.
5	Dan Wootton announces his departure from GB News following the previous day's Ofcom ruling.
7	The winners of the BBC's 2024 500 Words young writers' competition are announced, with awards presented by Queen Camilla.
10	Ryan Thomas and professional dance partner Amani Fancy win series 16 of Dancing on Ice. Greg Rutherford is forced to withdraw from the final after sustaining an injury during rehearsals.
11	Ben Shephard and Cat Deeley make their presenting debut on This Morning.
12	The Radio Today website reports that Bauer Media Audio UK plans to remove its radio stations from Freeview in the coming months.
14	Former Conservative MP Guto Bebb is appointed interim chair of S4C.
15	Sir Lenny Henry presents the BBC's Comic Relief telethon for the last time, having previously announced he felt it was time for "new faces" to succeed him. Sir Lenny was part of the team which had founded Comic Relief in the mid-1980s. Red Nose Day 2024 raises over £40m for charity.
16	Derek Thompson makes his final appearance in Casualty as the character Charlie Fairhead after 38 years with the series and appearances in more than 900 episodes.
18	Ofcom finds that five episodes of GB News shows, presented by Jacob Rees Mogg, Esther McVey and Phillip Davies, broke their rules, and warns the channel about its use of Conservative MPs to host news content.
21	Channel 4 chief executive Alex Mahon apologises to a member of the television channel's staff after a report finds that Channel 4 failed to investigate a complaint made against Russell Brand in 2009.
21	The UK government appoints a panel of nine experts from the world of radio, television and business to advise on the future funding of the BBC.
22	David Potts wins the twenty-third series of Celebrity Big Brother.
26	Director-General of the BBC Tim Davie announces the BBC will look at ways of reforming the TV licence.
27	Luke Avaient and Gavin Sheppard of Cardiff are married by Lorraine Kelly live on her daytime ITV programme to mark the tenth anniversary of the first same-sex marriage to occur in the UK.
28	The BBC confirms that Freddie Flintoff, who was injured in 2022 while filming an episode of Top Gear, will return to television with a BBC One documentary about cricket titled Field of Dreams.
29	Olly Alexander rejects calls to withdraw from the 2024 Eurovision Song Contest over the inclusion of Israel.
30	Finlay Anderson and Marie-Louise Nicholson win the 2024 series of Gladiators.

=== April ===
Date	Event
1	The cost of a TV licence increases by £10.50 from £159 to £169.50.
1	Ruth Hart wins the 2023–24 series of Mastermind.
4	GB News hires Steven Edgington as its North America correspondent, making him the channel's first international correspondent.
5	The BBC confirms it will broadcast a celebrity special of Gladiators, having previously announced that the show will return for a second series.
8	Imperial College London wins the 2023–24 series of University Challenge, the fifth time they have become series champion.
11	The Metropolitan Police says it will partly reinvestigate its decision to charge late television presenter Caroline Flack with assaulting her boyfriend because "new witness evidence may be available".
11	Sky News reports that hedge fund manager Sir Paul Marshall is to relinquish his seat on the board of All Perspectives Ltd, the company that owns GB News, as the television channel faces a major restructuring process.
12	The BBC confirms that Varada Sethu will be joining Millie Gibson as a companion in the fifteenth series of Doctor Who.
13	Boom Radio announces the launch of a £500,000 advertising campaign on ITV1, its first on the channel. Jo Brand has also been hired to present a series of programmes in which she interviews prominent television personalities, including Michael Grade.
13	ITV1 airs the two-hour finale of the 2024 series of Ant & Dec's Saturday Night Takeaway, which is watched by an average audience of 4.6 million viewers.
15	Disney is reportedly planning to add linear cable-style streaming channels to Disney+. According to The Information, the company wants subscribers to spend more time in the app and, by offering more viewing options, it may entice users to stick around. In addition, by running ads on these channels, Disney could boost its bottom line.
17	The Hollywood Reporter has reported that Johnny Ferraro is to bring back American Gladiators following the BBC's successful reboot of the British version.
18	Boutique gym boss Rachel Woodford wins Series 18 of The Apprentice.
19	GB News chief executive Angelos Frangopoulos announces 40 redundancies at the channel after it previously posted heavy financial losses.
20	BBC Two celebrates 60 years of broadcasting with several special programmes shown in the days surrounding the anniversary.
22	Newsreader Huw Edwards resigns from the BBC, nine months after being suspended following allegations of sexual misconduct and being admitted to hospital with "serious mental health issues".
22	Brenda Blethyn announces the next series of Vera will be her last after she decides to leave the show.
23	It is announced that Olly Alexander will make a cameo appearance in EastEnders in May.
24	ITV's managing director of media and entertainment, Kevin Lygo, says that the drama Mr Bates vs The Post Office lost the broadcaster £1m.
24	Ofcom warns radio and television stations with programmes hosted by politicians that they could be fined if they break impartiality rules in the run up to the next general election.
26	Newsreader Rageh Omaar is taken ill while presenting News at Ten and subsequently receives medical treatment.
29	Talk switches from television to online streaming format. The cessation of linear broadcasting sees the channel drop the letters TV from its name. The Local TV network, which adopted the Talk name in October 2023, reverts to using the Local TV name.
30	BritBox shuts down its standalone service in the UK with all of its content moving over to both BBC iPlayer and ITVX.

=== May ===
Date	Event
1	Television news presenters Martine Croxall, Annita McVeigh, Karin Giannone and Kasia Madera launch legal action against the BBC on the grounds of sex and age discrimination and equal pay. Their case for equal pay is subsequently rejected, but the sex and age discrimination cases will be heard by a tribunal.
2	Don Gilet is named as the next lead detective in Death in Paradise; he will join the next series of the show as Detective Inspector Mervin Wilson.
2	Welsh language broadcaster S4C announces that it will broadcast a Welsh language version of ITV programme The Voice. The show, titled Y Llais, will be hosted by BBC Radio 1 DJ Sian Eleri and will be broadcast in 2025.
3	The BBC announces that Joanna Lumley will reveal the UK jury's results at the Eurovision Song Contest.
10	Doctor Who returns for its 14th series, beginning with a two episode premiere on BBC iPlayer in the UK, and Disney+ internationally on the same evening, before airing in its normal Saturday night slot on BBC One the following day for the first time.
10	The Rise of Race Hatred, a BBC Spotlight documentary exploring the rise in race hate attacks in Northern Ireland wins the nations and regions category at the Amnesty UK Media Awards.
11	Olly Alexander represents the United Kingdom at the Eurovision Song Contest 2024 in Malmö, Sweden. The UK comes in 18th place out of 25 contestants. The contest is won by Switzerland with Nemo and their song "The Code".
12	The 2024 BAFTA Television Awards take place at the Royal Festival Hall, hosted by Rob Beckett and Romesh Ranganathan.
13	Channel 5 confirms that the long-running quiz show Eggheads has been shelved since the last episode was aired in April 2023.
17	James Ward Anderson, boss of plumbing firm Depher, complains to Ofcom over a BBC News investigation alleging his company faked stories of good deeds.
20	Ofcom says it is considering imposing a statutory sanction against GB News after concluding its programme People's Forum: The Prime Minister, a Q&A session with prime minister Rishi Sunak that aired in February, broke impartiality rules.
22	ITV airs episode 10,000 of Emmerdale.
23	GB News announces plans to launch legal action against Ofcom after the regulator ruled the channel had broken broadcasting rules.
23	Shona McGarty's final EastEnders scenes air as her character Whitney Dean leaves the series after 16 years.
25	A spokesperson for Eamonn Holmes and Ruth Langsford confirms the presenting couple are to divorce after 14 years of marriage.
27	Newsnight relaunches as a half-hour "interview, debate and discussion" programme, ditching its special reporting team. The change is part of cost-cutting measures across the BBC.
28	BBC News announces that its election night coverage will be hosted by Clive Myrie and Laura Kuenssberg.
29	Alfie Watts and Owen Wood win Series Four of Race Across the World.
31	ITV axes its pre-school programming block littleBe, doing so without any official announcement. It had aired on ITVBe on weekday mornings.

=== June ===
Date	Event
2	Singer Sydnie Christmas wins the 2024 series of Britain's Got Talent.
3	The BBC News at One is extended to an hour-long programme to coincide with its move from London to Salford.
3	Love Island returns for an eleventh series with a launch episode airing simultaneously on ITV1 and ITV2, which sees Joey Essex enter the villa as the first ever celebrity "bombshell".
3	The first 2024 general election leaders debate takes place in Scotland, with the leaders of Scotland's four main political parties taking part in a debate on STV.
4	ITV1 airs Sunak vs Starmer: The ITV Debate, a head-to-head election debate between Rishi Sunak and Keir Starmer presented by Julie Etchingham.
4	Netflix confirms plans for a Peaky Blinders film in which Cillian Murphy will reprise his role as Tommy Shelby.
5	ITV announces that Helen Worth has decided to leave Coronation Street after 50 years of portraying Gail Platt, with the character making her departure from the soap later in the year.
6	A search is under way for television presenter Michael Mosley, who has disappeared while on holiday in the Greek island of Symi.
7	Mishal Husain moderates the first of the BBC's election debates featuring representatives from seven of the UK's political parties.
8	Katie Piper is forced to pull out of presenting her usual Saturday morning ITV Breakfast programme due to an "unexpected medical procedure". The programme is instead presented by Charlotte Hawkins.
8	Around 20,000 motorbikers celebrate "Dave Day" by riding from London to Barrow-in-Furness in memory of Hairy Biker Dave Myers, who died in February.
9	The body of Michael Mosley is found on a hillside near Agia Marina beach on Symi.
10	An initial post-mortem concludes that Michael Mosley died from natural causes.
10	The BBC publishes the line up of dancers to appear on the 2024 series of Strictly Come Dancing. The list includes Amy Dowden, who is scheduled to return following cancer treatment, while Giovanni Pernice will not return.
11	Sophie Raworth pulls out of presenting the BBC's The Prime Ministerial Debate, scheduled to air on 26 June, after fracturing her ankle; Mishal Husain will present instead.
11	BBC Scotland airs an election debate featuring the leaders of Scotland's five main political parties: John Swinney (SNP), Douglas Ross (Scottish Conservatives), Anas Sarwar (Scottish Labour), Alex Cole-Hamilton (Scottish Liberal Democrats) and Lorna Slater (Scottish Greens).
12	Sky News presenter Beth Rigby presents an election debate from Grimsby Town Hall, where Sunak and Starmer face questions from an audience.
13	ITV holds a debate featuring senior figures from the UK's seven main political parties and moderated by Julie Etchingham.
14	A coalition of commercial media and content businesses write to Labour to urge them not to introduce advertising on the BBC, fearing it could have a negative impact on consumers, licence fee payers and creative industries.
14	BBC One airs the tribute programme Michael Mosley – The Doctor Who Changed Britain following Mosley's recent death.
14	James Norton appears on the day's edition of CBeebies Bedtime Stories reading How to Manage a Mammoth by Dr Rose Stewart, a children's story that deals with type 1 diabetes.
14	Among those from the world of television to be recognised in the 2024 Birthday Honours are actress Imelda Staunton, who receives a DBE, Countdown lexicographer Susie Dent, who becomes an MBE, and professional dancer Amy Dowden from Strictly Come Dancing, who receives an MBE.
16	ITV Wales holds an election debate between senior figures from the three main political parties in Wales; David TC Davies (Conservative), Jo Stevens (Labour) and Liz Saville Roberts (Plaid Cymru).
18	Cat Deeley apologises after making a joke about having a seizure on the previous day's edition of This Morning.
19	The BBC says its presenters are "regularly reminded" of its guidelines relating to clothing after Gary Lineker appeared to breach those rules by wearing an outfit from his own fashion range during England's opening Euro 2024 match against Serbia.
20	BBC One airs a Question Time election special featuring the leaders of the UK's four main political parties.
21	BBC Wales airs a televised election debate featuring Vaughan Gething (Labour), Jane Dodds (Liberal Democrat), Rhun ap Iorwerth (Plaid Cymru) and David TC Davies (Conservative).
21	Professional dancer Robin Windsor, who appeared on Strictly Come Dancing, is given a special posthumous award at the 2024 LGBT Awards.
26	Mishal Husain moderates The Prime Ministerial Debate, the BBC's head-to-head debate between Rishi Sunak and Keir Starmer.
27	The final televised debate of the 2024 general election takes place on BBC One Northern Ireland and features representatives from Northern Ireland's five main parties.
30	The Box Plus Network's five channels – The Box, Magic, Kiss TV, 4Music and Kerrang! TV – close. The closures come after Channel 4 had announced that they are among the "small linear channels ...[that] no longer deliver[ed] revenues or public value at scale".

=== July ===
Date	Event
1	Steve Carson is to step down as Head of Multi-Platform Commissioning at BBC Scotland in September, in order to take up a senior role at Irish broadcaster RTÉ.
2	Eamonn Holmes is forced to leave his GB News breakfast show halfway through the programme due to ill health.
3	The BBC announces that Tracy-Ann Oberman will be reprising her role of Chrissie Watts in EastEnders for a short time later in the year, 19 years after her departure.
4	2024 United Kingdom general election. The BBC's election night coverage is fronted by Laura Kuenssberg and Clive Myrie. ITV's election night coverage is led by Tom Bradby, with Robert Peston, Anushka Asthana and Paul Brand. Sky News's election night programming is presented by Kay Burley, who covers her twelfth general election, and Channel 4's coverage is led by Channel 4 News presenter Krishnan Guru-Murthy and former BBC Newsnight presenter Emily Maitlis.
4	Security guard Gavin Plumb is found guilty of plotting to kidnap, rape and murder television presenter Holly Willoughby.
5	Following Labour's election victory, Lisa Nandy is appointed as Secretary of State for Culture, Media and Sport, replacing Lucy Frazer.
11	Channel 4 announces 90% of its 2024 Summer Paralympics team are disabled, with 1,300 hours of live sport across Channel 4, More4 and streaming. Apart from Clare Balding, Vick Hope and Lee McKenzie, the rest are disabled, with Ellie Simmonds, Rose Ayling-Ellis, Lenny Rush, and Fury (Jodie Ounsley) from "Gladiators" making their presenting debuts.
11	A week after his election to Parliament, GB News announces that Nigel Farage is returning to his show on the channel, presenting on Tuesdays, Wednesdays and Thursdays from 16 July.
12	Following his guilty verdict on 4 July, Gavin Plumb is sentenced to life imprisonment, with a minimum term of 15 years.
13	Professional dancer Graziano Di Prima confirms he is leaving Strictly Come Dancing.
14	BBC One and ITV1 both air the UEFA Euro 2024 final, which is watched by an average audience of 17.9m, peaking at 19.3m.
16	Launch date for UKTV rebranding of its free-to-air channels under the name of "U", for example, Dave becomes "U&Dave" and W becomes "U&W".
16	The BBC says it will put a member of Strictly Come Dancing production staff in all future rehearsals following complaints about the behaviour of two of its professional dancers.
18	Following the previous day's 2024 State Opening of Parliament, BBC News ends its temporary UK only feed established to cover the general election.
18	A spokesman for Graziano Di Prima confirms he kicked dance partner Zara McDermott during training and was removed from the programme as a result.
19	Sky News and CBBC are taken off air due to the 2024 CrowdStrike incident.
19	Billie Eilish becomes the latest celebrity to appear on CBeebies Bedtime Stories, reading This Moose Belongs to Me by Oliver Jeffers.
20	Channel 4 announces the return of Educating Yorkshire, with a new series to air in 2025.
21	Speaking to The Sun on Sunday, former Strictly contestant Amanda Abbington, who withdrew from the last series in October 2023, alleges dance partner Giovanni Pernice behaved unreasonably towards her, describing it as "unnecessary, abusive, cruel and mean".
22	Paralympian Will Bayley, who appeared on Strictly Come Dancing in 2019, says that performing a jump routine with dance partner Janette Manrara left him in "horrific pain" and with "injuries that still affect me to this day".
22	It is announced that the BBC News channel's 11pm UK-produced bulletin, which featured during the election campaign, will be made permanent. This means that the news channel will have its first exclusively-produced bulletin for its UK stream since its merger into a global news service last year.
23	Director-General of the BBC Tim Davie apologises to contestants on Strictly Come Dancing after complaints about abusive behaviour, which he describes as "unacceptable". Davie also confirms the show will return later in the year.
24	RTÉ News bulletins are geoblocked in Northern Ireland because of broadcast licencing problems over coverage of the 2024 Summer Olympics.
25	RTÉ confirms it will resume showing news broadcasts in Northern Ireland, although they will not be live during the Olympics.
26	BBC One broadcasts the opening ceremony of the 2024 Summer Olympics, which culminates in a performance of Edith Piaf's "Hymne à l'amour" by Celine Dion at the Eiffel Tower. The ceremony is watched by an average 6.8 million viewers.
27	Laura Whitmore becomes the latest Strictly contestant to allege she was the victim of inappropriate behaviour during her time on the show.
29	Former BBC newsreader Huw Edwards is charged with making indecent images of children.
29	Figures reveal that S4C spent more than £500,000 on its investigation into allegations of bullying and toxic culture at the broadcaster.
29	Mimii Ngulube and Josh Oyinsan win the eleventh series of Love Island, and become the first black couple to win the series.
31	Former BBC newsreader Huw Edwards pleads guilty to three counts of making indecent images of children at a hearing at Westminster Magistrates' Court.
31	Ofcom's annual Media Nations survey is published, revealing that for the first time less than half of 16-to-24-year-olds (48%) are regularly watching traditional television.

=== August ===
Date	Event
2	The Doctor Who episode "Fear Her" featuring Huw Edwards is removed from BBC iPlayer after Edwards pleaded guilty to three counts of making indecent images of children. The BBC confirms that the episode will be reinstated after Edwards had been re-dubbed.
2	BAFTA announces the creation of a new category for children's and family films, with those rated U, PG or 12A being eligible.
3	The BBC removes a video promoting Children in Need 2018 from its website after it emerges the video features the suspect in the 2024 Southport stabbing.
4	The Observer reports that the BBC has started removing content that includes Huw Edwards from its website, beginning with family entertainment programming on BBC iPlayer.
5	Comedian Chris McCausland is officially announced as the first celebrity contestant for the 22nd series of Strictly Come Dancing, becoming the show's first ever blind contestant in the process.
6	Ofcom approves planned changes to the BBC Scotland television channel that will see cutbacks to its news, with its hour-long 9pm weekday programme The Nine replaced by a 30 minute programme at 7pm.
7	Further allegations of abuse emerge against Strictly Come Dancing as a number of junior members of staff allege a toxic culture behind the scenes of the programme.
7	Ofcom have received more than 8,200 complaints about two interviews during the 5 August edition of Good Morning Britain – the first involving presenter Ed Balls who spoke to his wife, Home Secretary Yvette Cooper, and the second involving an interview Balls and Kate Garraway did with Labour MP Zarah Sultana.
8	Sky launches Sky Sports+, its new streaming service for its sports customers. The launch coincides with the start of the 2024/2025 football season.
9	The BBC asks Huw Edwards to repay over £200,000 that he received from the corporation after being arrested on child abuse image charges in November 2023.
9	Actress, comedian and writer Meera Syal appears on CBeebies Bedtime Stories to read Amma's Sari by Sandhya Parappukaran to mark South Asian Heritage Month.
12	Viewing data indicates that programming from the 2024 Summer Olympics was streamed 218 million times during the 19 days of sporting events. Overall, 36 million people watched some Olympic content for fifteen minutes or longer, with a peak audience of 6 million on several days.
16	Eden rebranded to U&Eden.
19	A new game show succeeding Unbeatable hosted by Jason Manford. The Answer Run debuts on BBC One to replace repeats of The Finish Line.
20	It is reported that Paramount Networks UK & Australia is planning a rebrand of Channel 5 to occur in early-2025, which would see its name shortened to "5". In addition, catch-up platform My5 will also be consolidated under the "5" branding to unify its linear and streaming outlets, following the lead of Channel 4. In addition, plans to consolidate Pluto TV with My5 are shelved.
21	Radio and television presenter Lauren Laverne reveals that she is being treated in hospital for cancer.
22	Former footballer and presenter Jermaine Jenas is sacked by the BBC following allegations of inappropriate behaviour.
22	The BBC announces plans to produce a celebrity version of its reality show, The Traitors, with a date to be confirmed.
22	The BBC acquires its rights to stage the 2025 Women's Rugby World Cup in England for the first time after the 2017 and 2022 editions staged in Ireland and New Zealand respectively were shown on ITV.
23	Jermaine Jenas tells The Sun newspaper he is "ashamed" and has "let everybody down" after sending "inappropriate messages" to two colleagues on The One Show.
28	Channel 4 begins its coverage of the 2024 Summer Paralympics, starting with the opening ceremony.
30	Luton Borough Council asks Bedfordshire Police to stop working with the television programme 24 Hours in Police Custody because it argues the show is damaging the town's reputation.

=== September ===
Date	Event
2–6	BBC Radio 2 presenters Jo Whiley, Scott Mills, Trevor Nelson, Vernon Kay and Sara Cox take part in a CBeebies Bedtime Stories takeover.
9	Ofcom discontinues five impartiality investigations into GB News's "Don't Kill Cash" campaign as the channel had already been reprimanded over the campaign.
10	An inquest into the death of Steve Dymond, who committed suicide in 2019, shortly after appearing on The Jeremy Kyle Show, rules that the show was a "possible" factor in his death, but not the "probable" cause.
11	The 29th National Television Awards are held in London, with the drama Mr Bates vs The Post Office picking up three awards.
12	The UK government confirms that a ban on junk food advertising on British television before 9.00pm is scheduled to come into force on 1 October 2025.
13	Jay Blades, presenter of BBC One's The Repair Shop, is charged with coercive behaviour towards his estranged wife. The BBC pulls all episodes featuring Blades from its schedule.
14	Strictly Come Dancing returns for Series 22, with Amy Dowden returning to the show following her treatment for cancer.
16	Huw Edwards, formerly the BBC's most senior news presenter, is given a six-month suspended jail sentence for child abuse image offences. He is placed on the sex offenders' register for seven years and is required to complete a rehabilitation programme.
16	Having had its weekly number of episodes reduced from five to three the previous week, the plotline of Hollyoaks jumps forward a year in order to facilitate the exit of 20 characters, who have been axed due to budget cuts on the show.
17	The BBC announces that the children's television series Balamory will return on CBeebies with the original cast, 20 years after it was last recorded.
18	Ofcom announces it will not investigate Ed Balls' interview with his wife, Home Secretary Yvette Cooper, on Good Morning Britain on 5 August despite receiving over 16,000 viewer complaints. ITV chief executive Dame Carolyn McCall defends the interview's impartiality, but says the broadcaster would not do it again.
18	BBC Radio 2 presenter Scott Mills and his spouse, Sam Vaughan, win Series 2 of Celebrity Race Across the World. Overnight viewing figures indicate the series finale was watched by an average 3.7 million viewers.
19	A number of Sky Glass customers begin reporting problems with their Sky Glass televisions, which will not turn on.
23	The BBC celebrates the 50th anniversary of the launch of its Ceefax teletext service.
25	ITV confirms Maya Jama is to join the celebrity panel for the upcoming sixth series of The Masked Singer, replacing Rita Ora.
25	Channel 5 announces that Phillip Schofield will take part in Cast Away, a new three-part show airing over three consecutive nights from 30 September in which he is stranded on a deserted island in Madagascar for 10 days without food, water or a filming crew. It is Schofield's first television project since resigning in disgrace from ITV in May 2023 following revelations over his personal life.
26	RuPaul's Drag Race UK returns for its sixth series.
30	The BBC apologises to Amanda Abbington after upholding some of her complaints against the behaviour of her Strictly dance partner Giovanni Pernice, but the broadcaster does not uphold her allegations of physical abuse.

=== October ===
Date	Event
3	BBC One airs the documentary The Search for Nicola Bulley about the 2023 disappearance of Nicola Bulley. The programme receives criticism from viewers for the amount of time spent discussing the involvement of social media amateur sleuths.
3	BBC presenter Laura Kuenssberg cancels a scheduled televised interview with Boris Johnson after accidentally sending him her briefing notes.
4	ITV confirms that Freddie Flintoff will present a rebooted special edition of the quiz show Bullseye at Christmas.
4	GB News loses a High Court challenge against Ofcom in which it hoped to temporarily block the regulator from sanctioning it over its People's Forum programme featuring Rishi Sunak in February, while Sunak was prime minister. GB News is given permission to challenge the ruling, with Ofcom agreeing to hold off publication of its findings until the case is heard.
5	For the first time in Strictly's 20-year history, a dancing couple on the show perform to a traditional Bollywood song.
8	Channel 4 announces that it will be showing coverage of the 2024 United States presidential election on Tuesday 5 November. The coverage will be titled America Decides: The US Election results, and will be produced by ITN Productions, and will be the broadcaster's first live overnight US election coverage since 1992.
11	The BBC launches a review into its workplace culture, focusing on "preventing abuse of power and ensuring everyone at the BBC conducts themselves in line with our values".
14	Detectives from Bedfordshire Police use the BBC's Crimewatch Live programme to appeal for information that may lead to the identity of a hitman who killed Carol Morgan on 13 August 1981 at the shop she ran with her husband, Allen Morgan, in Leighton Buzzard. Allen Morgan was convicted of hiring the hitman to kill his wife at Luton Crown Court in June 2024.
14	BBC One airs the first episode of EastEnders to be directed by a wheelchair user.
14	Our Yorkshire Farm spin-off Our Farm Next Door: Amanda, Clive and Kids makes its debut on More4. The spin-off features Amanda Owen alongside ex-husband Clive and nine fully grown-up children renovating a derelict farmhouse named Anty John's. This is the first observational documentary series not to be narrated since the main show ended in 2022.
16	Welsh-language soap opera Pobol y Cwm celebrates the 50th anniversary of its first episode being broadcast.
17	BBC One programme Crimewatch Live makes a fresh appeal for information leading to the discovery of the remains of Suzanne Pilley, who was murdered by her ex-partner in 2010.
17	Conservative Party leadership candidates Robert Jenrick and Kemi Badenoch take part in a leadership debate on GB News, but Badenoch has turned down an invitation to take part in a Question Time special on BBC One, and a planned online debate organised by The Sun.
24	It emerges that ITV have edited out a pro-Palestine symbol from an episode of Big Brother after a contestant wore a t-shirt displaying the symbol.
26	Professional dancer Amy Dowden is taken to hospital after collapsing backstage following the evening's edition of Strictly Come Dancing.
28	Professional dancer Lauren Oakley steps in to partner Strictly contestant JB Gill following Amy Dowden's backstage collapse on the previous Saturday's edition of the show.
29	Former GB News presenter Mark Steyn is ordered to pay £50,000 in legal costs after losing a case against Ofcom in which he alleged the regulator had "killed" his career with two rulings about COVID-19 content in his shows during 2022.
31	GB News is fined £100,000 by Ofcom for breaking impartiality rules with a programme featuring the former Prime Minister Rishi Sunak.

=== November ===
Date	Event
2	A joint investigation carried out by Channel 4's Dispatches and The Sunday Times reveals the extent of rent received by the Royal Estate from schools, the National Health Service and the armed forces.
2	On Strictly Come Dancing, JB Gill and stand-in professional dancer Lauren Oakley score the joint highest score of the series, as Amy Dowden returns to the show to watch them perform.
4	Amy Dowden pulls out of the 2024 series of Strictly Come Dancing following her collapse.
5	BBC One, BBC News, ITV1 and STV, Channel 4, GB News, Sky News and Sky Showcase show coverage of the 2024 United States presidential election.
7	UKTV completes its roll-out of the U brand when its two pay channels Gold and Alibi rebrand to U&Gold and U&Alibi.
10	GB News goes off-air during the Remembrance Sunday two-minute silence at 11am, with viewers seeing a test card accompanied by a sustained loud bleeping.
11	BBC News reports that Gary Lineker will step down from presenting Match of the Day at the end of the 2024–25 football season. The BBC confirms Lineker's departure from Match of the Day the following day, but says he will host BBC Sport's coverage of the 2026 World Cup.
12	Geraint Evans is appointed as the new chief executive of S4C.
13	The British Academy of Film and Television Arts (BAFTA) announces a change in its rules that will strip awards from anyone convicted of a serious crime, but the rules will not be applied retrospectively, meaning for example, that Huw Edwards will keep the awards he won.
14	The 9th Royal Television Society Northern Ireland Awards are scheduled to take place at Titanic Belfast.
14	Medical soap Doctors broadcasts its final ever episode after 24 years on air.
15	BBC One airs the BBC's annual Children in Need appeal, with £39m raised for charities by the end of the show.
15	Television presenter Davina McCall reveals that she has been diagnosed with a benign brain tumour known as a colloid cyst, and has undergone surgery to remove the growth.
15	Ali Bromley, a forensic psychologist from Leicester, wins the twenty-first series of ITV's Big Brother. She becomes the first lesbian to win the series as well as the oldest female winner in the show's history.
21	Rosie Millard resigns as chair of the BBC's Children in Need charity following reports she protested about the awarding of a grant to an LGBTQ youth charity whose former chief executive had been involved in a child abuse scandal.
26	Publication of "The Future of News", a House of Lords report which warns of the emergence of a "two-tier" news system, where large organisations and niche outlets are the only news providers that will be financially viable. The report also warns that BBC News risks losing viewers to "alternative" outlets such as GB News if it does not reform its coverage.
26	Georgie Grasso wins Series 15 of The Great British Bake Off.
28	Gregg Wallace temporarily steps aside from presenting MasterChef whilst claims of historical misconduct are investigated.
28	Kyran Thrax wins the sixth series of RuPaul's Drag Race UK, and is the inaugural winner of a £25,000 cash prize.
29	The UK government announces that the cost of a TV licence will increase by £5 from April 2025 to £174.50.

=== December ===
Date	Event
2	MasterChef presenter Gregg Wallace apologises for suggesting allegations against him came from "a handful of middle-class women of a certain age".
2	Ian Smith, who plays Harold Bishop in Neighbours, tells Australia's 10 News First he is leaving the show after he was diagnosed with pulmonary pleomorphic carcinoma, a rare form of lung cancer, which he has been told is terminal.
3	The BBC announces it has pulled the MasterChef Christmas Special following allegations made against Gregg Wallace.
4	BBC newsreader and presenter Clive Myrie apologises for failing to declare at least £145,000 of non-BBC earnings to his employer.
4	Research from Barb Audiences indicates viewing figures for GB News surpassed those for Sky News for the first time during November, with an average audience of 70,430 for GB News over a 20 hour period from 6am to 2am, compared to 67,670 for Sky News.
6	Dame Sarah Storey confirms she has been forced to withdraw from the upcoming series of Dancing on ice after fracturing her ankle during training.
7	Animated characters Wallace & Gromit make a guest appearance on the evening's edition of Strictly Come Dancing.
8	Danny Jones of McFly wins the 24th series of I'm A Celebrity...Get Me Out Of Here!.
9	BBC Scotland announces the launch of two new news programmes in early 2025: Reporting Scotland: News at Seven, a weeknight news bulletin presented by Laura Maciver and Amy Irons on the BBC Scotland channel from 6 January, and the Scotcast podcast with Martin Geissler launching on 13 January.
9	A report by the Centre for Media Monitoring indicates that GB News accounted for half of all news stories about Muslims over a two year period, much of them negative, something the report describes as a "excessive" focus bordering on "obsession".
14	Comedian Chris McCausland and professional dance partner Dianne Buswell win Series 22 of Strictly Come Dancing. McCausland is the first blind contestant to compete in the series, and the first to win.
16	Strictly Come Dancing confirms that Amy Dowden will return for the series' live tour in 2025.
17	BBC Studios is to team up with Disney to produce a film based on the children's television series Bluey, due for release in 2027.
17	Ofcom apologises after campaigners criticised the watchdog for "trivialising" violence against women and girls over a LinkedIn post in which a senior member of staff jokingly promote a job supervising the porn industry, describing the joke as "ill-judged".
17	Channel 4 and Disney Entertainment sign a new contract to air The Simpsons that will see new seasons of the series premiere on Disney+ before showing on E4 and becoming available through Channel 4's streaming service. The programme will also move from its weeknight slot on Channel 4 to E4 from January 2025, with Season 32 airing on E4 from January, and Season 36 airing on Disney+ from Spring 2025.
17	Olympic 800m gold medallist Keely Hodgkinson is voted the 2024 BBC Sports Personality of the Year.
18	The BBC announces that Grace Dent will replace Gregg Wallace as host of Celebrity MasterChef.
19	GB News unveils a new schedule for 2025. Highlights include the departures of Mark Dolan, Isabel Webster and Andrew Doyle, while Ben Leo will present Ben Leo Tonight on Saturdays and Sundays, and Miriam Cates will present Dewbs & Co every other Friday. Ellie Costello will co-present breakfast alongside Eamonn Holmes on Mondays to Wednesdays and Stephen Dixon on Thursdays and Fridays.
20	Fiona Wood becomes the first woman to win a series of Countdown since 1998.
21	US President-elect Donald Trump appoints British TV executive Mark Burnett as the inaugural United States Special Envoy to the United Kingdom.
23	It is announced that King Charles III will deliver his Christmas message from Fitzrovia Chapel, the first time in over a decade that it hasn't been recorded in a royal residence.
23	A 90-minute colourisation of the 1969 Doctor Who serial "The War Games" airs on BBC Four.
24	Paul Bradley reprises his role as EastEnders character Nigel Bates 26 years after last appearing in the series.
25	King Charles III presents the Royal Christmas Message from the Fitzrovia Chapel, a former hospital chapel in central London.
25	Comedian Chris McCausland presents Channel 4's Alternative Christmas Message.
25	Stop-motion animation Wallace & Gromit: Vengeance Most Fowl has its UK premiere on BBC One.
25	The final ever episode of Gavin & Stacey airs as part of BBC One's Christmas Day schedule. It attracts 12.3 million viewers (on overnight figures) – the largest Christmas Day audience in more than a decade, and the year's highest non-sport overnight figure. By early 2025, viewing figures reach 19.3 million, the UK’s most-watched scripted show across all broadcasters and streamers since comparable records began in 2002. Barb-produced figures give the programme an audience of 19.11 million in the first week following its transmission.
25	The Christmas Day edition of Strictly Come Dancing becomes the first to feature a dance competition involving drag queens. The contest is won by Welsh drag queen Tayce.
25	Helen Worth makes her final onscreen appearance as Coronation Street's Gail Platt after 50 years with the series.
29	Conservative Party allies of Kemi Badenoch reject claims she asked GB News to reduce Nigel Farage's airtime on the channel.
30	2025 New Year Honours: Those from the world of television recognised in the New Year Honours include Stephen Fry who receives a knighthood, and Sarah Lancashire who becomes a CBE.
31	BBC One sees in the New Year with Sophie Ellis-Bextor, who performs and hosts a "New Year Disco".

== Debuts ==
=== BBC ===
Date	Debut	Channel
10 January	Style It Out	CBBC
17 January	Liar: The Fake Grooming Scandal	BBC Three
21 January	Wilderness with Simon Reeve	BBC Two
22 January	David & Jay's Touring Toolshed	BBC Two
31 January	Domino Day	BBC Three
2 February	Amityville: An Origin Story	BBC Two
14 February	Bring the Drama	BBC Two
19 February	The Way	BBC One
20 February	Boarders	BBC Three
22 February	Martin Compston's Norwegian Fling	BBC Scotland
29 February	Things You Should Have Done	BBC Three
5 March	Sarah Everard: The Search for Justice	BBC One
18 March	Anton & Giovanni's Adventures in Spain	BBC One
26 March	Quiet Life	BBC Three
27 March	Andi Oliver's Fabulous Feasts	BBC Two
31 March	Mammals	BBC One
31 March	This Town	BBC One
9 April	Ministry of Evil: The Twisted Cult of Tony Alamo	BBC Four
14 April	Dinosaur	BBC Three
5 May	I Kissed a Girl	BBC Three
7 May	Business Today	BBC One / BBC Two / BBC News
17 May	Rebus	BBC One / BBC Scotland
3 June	Lost Boys and Fairies	BBC One
1 July	A Good Girl's Guide to Murder	BBC Three
8 July	Spent	BBC Two
10 July	Cooking Buddies	CBBC
15 July	The Jetty	BBC One
25 July	Sneakerhead	BBC Three
2 August	Miriam Margoyles: A New Australian Adventure	BBC Two
14 August	Kidnapped: The Chloe Ayling Story	BBC Three
15 August	Daddy Issues	BBC Three
17 August	Made in Korea: The K-Pop Experience	BBC One
19 August	The Answer Run	BBC One
19 August	We Might Regret This	BBC Two
25 August	Big Cats 24/7	BBC Two
4 September	The Zelensky Story	BBC Two
9 September	SAS: Catching the Criminals	BBC One
10 September	Salmond and Sturgeon: A Troubled Union	BBC Scotland
15 September	Nightsleeper	BBC One
17 September	Nadiya's Cook Once Eat Twice	BBC Two
25 September	Ludwig	BBC One
26 September	Rick Stein's Food Stories	BBC Two
29 September	Paddy and Chris: Road Tripping	BBC One
4 October	Myth Country	BBC Three
7 October	Solar System	BBC Two
14 October	Michael Mosley – Just One Thing	BBC One
14 October	Mr Loverman	BBC One
29 October	Mary's Foolproof Dinners	BBC Two
3 November	Asia	BBC One
10 November	Wolf Hall: The Mirror and the Light	BBC One
16 November	Moonflower Murders	BBC One
19 November	The Listeners	BBC One
21 November	Only Child	BBC Scotland
22 November	Return to Paradise	BBC One
28 November	Smoggie Queens	BBC Three
25 December	Tiddler	BBC One
25 December	Vengeance Most Fowl	BBC One

=== ITV ===
Date	Debut	Channel
1 January	Mr Bates vs The Post Office	ITV1
6 January	Big Zuu's 12 Dishes in 12 Hours	ITV1
10 January	After the Flood	ITV1
15 January	Love Island: All Stars	ITV2
22 January	Born from the Same Stranger	ITV1
28 January	TikTok: Murder Gone Viral	ITVX
8 February	G'wed	ITVX
19 February	Breathtaking	ITV1
24 February	Prue Leith's Cotswold Kitchen	ITV1
24 March	Passenger	ITV1
28 March	The Twelve	ITV1
10 April	Drama Queens	ITVBe
21 April	Red Eye	ITV1
13 May	The Fortune Hotel	ITV1
27 June	Douglas is Cancelled	ITV1
29 June	The Chris McCausland Show	ITV1
30 June	Jimmy and Shivi's Farmhouse Breakfast	ITV1
19 July	Champions: Full Gallop	ITV1
20 July	Piglets	ITV1
1 September	Olivia Attwood’s Bad Boyfriends	ITV2
17 September	Dress the Nation	ITV1
29 September	Joan	ITV1
10 October	Ash Holme: What Not to Do with Dad	ITV1
2 November	Romesh Ranganathan's Parents' Evening	ITV1
3 November	Until I Kill You	ITV1
23 December	Pictionary	ITV1

=== Channel 4 ===
Date	Debut	Channel
3 January	Truelove	Channel 4
4 January	Secret Life of the Safari Park	Channel 4
29 January	To Catch a Copper	Channel 4
14 February	Alice & Jack	Channel 4
26 February	The Jury: Murder Trial	Channel 4
25 March	The Underdog: Josh Must Win	E4
28 March	Big Mood	Channel 4
26 April	Double the Money	Channel 4
14 May	The Gathering	Channel 4
24 May	The Nevermets	Channel 4
4 June	Queenie	Channel 4
6 August	Yorkshire by the Sea	Channel 4
12 August	Second-Hand Showdown	E4
21 September	Abandoned Railways from Above	Channel 4
24 September	Into the Jungle with Ed Stafford	Channel 4
7 October	Jamie: Fast and Simple	Channel 4
7 October	Secret Amazon: Into the Wild	Channel 4
13 October	Generation Z	Channel 4
14 October	Our Farm Next Door: Amanda, Clive and Kids	More4
29 October	Beyond Chelsea	E4
2 December	Person of Interest	Channel 4

=== Channel 5 ===
Date	Debut	Channel
17 January	Finders Keepers	Channel 5
14 February	Too Good to Be True	Channel 5
11 March	Love Rat	Channel 5
18 March	Coma	Channel 5
8 April	The Cuckoo	Channel 5
7 July	The Night Caller	Channel 5
16 September	The Wives	Channel 5
30 September	Phillip Schofield: Cast Away	Channel 5
7 October	The Hardacres	Channel 5
31 October	Ellis	Channel 5
12 November	Killed By Our Daughter: The Virginia McCullough Murders	Channel 5

=== Sky ===
Date	Debut	Channel
29 February	Rob Beckett's Smart TV	Sky Max
5 March	Mary & George	Sky Atlantic
2 May	The Tattooist of Auschwitz	Sky Atlantic
17 July	Mr. Bigstuff	Sky Max
10 October	Sweetpea	Sky Atlantic
7 November	The Day of the Jackal	Sky Atlantic
22 December	Bad Tidings	Sky Max

=== Other channels ===
Date	Debut	Channel
1 January	Fool Me Once	Netflix
10 January	Criminal Record	Apple TV+
14 January	Belgravia: The Next Chapter	MGM+
25 January	Sexy Beast	Paramount+
7 February	Hot Mess Summer	Amazon Prime Video
8 February	One Day	Netflix
21 February	Constellation	Apple TV+
26 February	Out of Order	Comedy Central
28 February	Iwájú	Disney+ / Star
1 March	The Completely Made-Up Adventures of Dick Turpin	Apple TV+
1 March	Dead Hot	Amazon Prime Video
6 March	The Marlow Murder Club	U
7 March	The Gentlemen	Netflix
29 March	A Gentleman in Moscow	Paramount+
29 March	Renegade Nell	Disney+
11 April	Baby Reindeer	Netflix
24 April	The Red King	Alibi
29 April	The Vanishing Triangle	Acorn TV
1 May	Shardlake	Disney+ / Star
22 May	Buying London	Netflix
23 May	Insomnia	Paramount+
30 May	Eric	Netflix
30 May	Geek Girl	Netflix
27 June	My Lady Jane	Amazon Prime Video
27 June	Supacell	Netflix
16 July	Battle in the Box	U&Dave
7 August	Love Is Blind: UK	Netflix
15 August	Stags	Paramount+
29 August	Kaos	Netflix
19 September	A Very Royal Scandal	Amazon Prime Video
18 October	Rivals	Disney+ / Star
25 October	Nautilus	Amazon Prime Video
5 December	Black Doves	Netflix
26 December	The Road Trip	Paramount+

== Channels and streaming services ==
=== New channels ===
Date	Channel
2 January	That's TV 2
11 February	Sky Sports Tennis
4 March	Chart Show Retro
20 March	GREAT! Real
23 May	Rewind TV
12 June	Seen on TV
24 June	That's Dance
3 July	Now 90s & 00s
21 August	That's TV 3

=== New streaming services ===
Date	Channel
30 April	Freely
2 July	Tubi
8 August	Sky Sports+

=== Defunct channels/streaming services ===
Date	Channel
9 January	Peacock
25 January	Viaplay Xtra
29 February	Lionsgate+
20 March	Tiny Pop
31 March	SportyStuff TV
30 April	BritBox
30 April	Talk
25 June	Seen on TV
30 June	The Box
30 June	Magic
30 June	Kiss TV
30 June	4Music
30 June	Kerrang! TV
20 August	GREAT! Real

=== Rebranding channels/streaming services ===
Date	Old name	New name
16 July
16 July	UKTV Play	U
16 July	Dave	U&Dave
16 July	Drama	U&Drama
16 July	W	U&W
16 July	Yesterday	U&Yesterday
16 October	Eden	U&Eden
7 November	Alibi	U&Alibi
7 November	Gold	U&Gold

== Television programmes ==
=== Changes of network affiliation ===
Programme	Moved from	Moved to
American Rust	Sky Atlantic	Amazon Prime Video
All BritBox Programmes to Be Revealed	BritBox	ITVX
The Walking Dead	Disney+	Sky Max
Gladiators	Sky1	BBC One

=== Returning this year after a break of one year or longer ===
Programme	Date(s) of original removal	Original channel(s)	Date of return	New channel(s)
Jeopardy!	2 July 1984; 9 April 1993; 7 June 1996	Channel 4 ITV1; Sky1	1 January 2024	ITV1
Wheel of Fortune	21 December 2001	ITV1	6 January 2024	N/A (same channel as original)
Gladiators	1 January 2000; 25 October 2009	ITV1; Sky1	13 January 2024	BBC One
RuPaul's Drag Race: UK vs. the World	8 March 2022	BBC Three	9 February 2024	N/A (same channel as original)
The World Today	6 May 2011	BBC One; BBC News; BBC World News	21 February 2024	BBC News
Celebrity Big Brother	25 January 2010; 10 September 2018	Channel 4 Channel 5	4 March 2024	ITV1
Password	10 September 1963; 3 January 1976; 14 May 1983; 29 July 1988	ITV; BBC1/2; Channel 4 ITV	31 August 2024	N/A (same channel as original)
Lingo	14 July 1988; 3 January 2023	ITV1	2 September 2024	N/A (same channel as original)
I'm a Celebrity: Unpacked	8 December 2020	ITV2	17 November 2024	N/A (same channel as original)
You Bet!	12 April 1997	ITV	7 December 2024	N/A (same channel as original)
Bullseye	8 July 1995; 22 September 2006	ITV; Challenge	22 December 2024	N/A (same channel as original)

== Continuing television programmes ==
=== 1920s ===
Programme	Date
BBC Wimbledon	1927–1939, 1946–2019, 2021–present

=== 1930s ===
Programme	Date
Trooping the Colour	1937–1939, 1946–2019, 2023–present
The Boat Race	1938–1939, 1946–2019, 2021–present
BBC Cricket	1939, 1946–1999, 2020–present

=== 1950s ===
Programme	Date
Eurovision Song Contest	1956–2019, 2021–present
The Sky at Night	1957–present
Final Score	1958–present
Blue Peter	1958–present

=== 1960s ===
Programme	Date
Coronation Street	1960–present
Points of View	1961–present
Songs of Praise	1961–present
University Challenge	1962–1987, 1994–present
Doctor Who	1963–1989, 1996, 2005–present
Horizon	1964–present
Match of the Day	1964–present
Top of the Pops	1964–2006, 2006–present
Gardeners' World	1968–present

=== 1970s ===
Programme	Date
Emmerdale	1972–present
Mastermind (including Celebrity Mastermind)	1972–1997, 2003–present
Football Focus	1974–1988, 1992–present
Ski Sunday	1978–present
Blankety Blank	1979–1990, 1997–2002, 2016, 2020–present
Antiques Roadshow	1979–present
Question Time	1979–present

=== 1980s ===
Programme	Date
Children in Need	1980–present
Countdown	1982–present
EastEnders	1985–present
Comic Relief	1988–present
Catchphrase	1986–2002, 2013–present
Casualty	1986–present
This Morning	1988–present
Countryfile	1988–present

=== 1990s ===
Programme	Date
Have I Got News for You	1990–present
MasterChef	1990–2001, 2005–2025
ITV News Meridian	1993–present
National Television Awards	1995–2008, 2010–present
Silent Witness	1996–present
Midsomer Murders	1997–present
Classic Emmerdale	1998–2004, 2019–present
Who Wants to Be a Millionaire?	1998–2014, 2018–present
Loose Women	1999–present

=== 2000s ===
Programme	Date
Bargain Hunt	2000–present
BBC Breakfast	2000–present
Big Brother	2000–2018, 2023–present
Click	2000–present
Unreported World	2000–present
BBC South East Today	2001–present
Survivor	2001–2002, 2023–present
Escape to the Country	2002–present
I'm a Celebrity...Get Me Out of Here!	2002–present
Ant & Dec's Saturday Night Takeaway	2002–2009, 2013–2018, 2020–2024
River City	2002–2026
Saturday Kitchen	2002–present
QI	2003–present
Eggheads	2003–present
Homes Under the Hammer	2003–present
Match of the Day 2	2004–present
Strictly Come Dancing	2004–present
The Big Fat Quiz of the Year	2004–present
Newswatch	2004–present
Strictly Come Dancing: It Takes Two	2004–present
Who Do You Think You Are?	2004–present
The Apprentice	2005–present
Classic Doctors	2005, 2023–present
Deal or No Deal	2005–2016, 2023–present
Dragons' Den	2005–present
The Hotel Inspector	2005–present
Pocoyo	2005–present
Springwatch	2005–present
The Apprentice: You're Fired!	2006–present
Banged Up Abroad	2006–present
Dancing on Ice	2006–2014, 2018–present
Not Going Out	2006–present
The One Show	2006–present
Waterloo Road	2006–2015, 2023–present
Britain's Got Talent	2007–2020, 2022–present
The Adventure Show	2007–present
Would I Lie to You?	2007–present
The Graham Norton Show	2007–present
Police Interceptors	2008–present
Soccer Aid	2008, 2010, 2012, 2014, 2016, 2018–present
Pointless	2009–present
The Chase	2009–present
Kate Garraway's Life Stories	2009–present

=== 2010s ===
Programme	Date
The Great British Bake Off	2010–present
Great British Railway Journeys	2010–present
Lorraine	2010–present
The Only Way Is Essex	2010–present
Sunday Morning Live	2010–present
Junior Bake Off	2011, 2013, 2015–2016, 2019, 2021–present
Made in Chelsea	2011–present
Death in Paradise	2011–present
24 Hours in A&E	2011–present
The Jonathan Ross Show	2011–present
Vera	2011–2025
8 Out of 10 Cats Does Countdown	2012–present
Call the Midwife	2012–present
Stand Up To Cancer	2012–present
The Voice UK	2012–present
Tipping Point	2012–present
The Dumping Ground	2013–present
Father Brown	2013–present
Agatha Raisin	2014–present
GPs: Behind Closed Doors	2014–present
Good Morning Britain	2014–present
Grantchester	2014, 2016–2017, 2019–present
STV News at Six	2014–present
The Great British Bake Off: An Extra Slice	2014–present
Hunted	2015–present
Love Island	2015–present
SAS: Who Dares Wins	2015–present
Taskmaster	2015–present
Travel Man	2015–present
Bake Off: The Professionals	2016–present
Naked Attraction	2016–present
Sorry, I Didn't Know	2016, 2020–present
Love Island: Aftersun	2017–present
The Repair Shop	2017–present
Richard Osman's House of Games	2017–present
Strike	2017–present
Peston	2018–present
Glow Up: Britain's Next Make-Up Star	2019–present
The Hit List	2019–present
Mandy	2019–present
RuPaul's Drag Race UK	2019–present

=== 2020s ===
Programme	Date
2020
Beat the Chasers	2020–present
Malory Towers	2020–present
The Masked Singer	2020–present
Trying	2020–present
The Wheel	2020–present
2021
Cooking with the Stars	2021–present
Hope Street	2021–present
2022
The 1% Club	2022–present
Limitless Win	2022–present
Celeb Cooking School	2022–2024
Heartstopper	2022–present
SAS: Rogue Heroes	2022, 2025
The Traitors	2022–present
Trigger Point	2022–present
2023
BBC News Now	2023–present
Black Ops	2023–present
Blue Lights	2023–present
Beyond Paradise	2023–present
Break Point	2023–present
Changing Ends	2023–present
Doctor Who: Unleashed	2023–present
PopMaster TV	2023–present
The Couple Next Door	2023–present
The Famous Five	2023–present
The Finish Line	2023–present
The Piano	2023–present
The Toy Hospital	2023–present

== Ending this year ==
Date	Programme	Channel(s)	Debut(s)
2 January	Wild Scandinavia	BBC Two	2023
4 January	Mr Bates vs The Post Office	ITV1	2024
12 January	The Early Rundown	Sky News	2019
18 January	Truelove	Channel 4	2024
2 February	Dickinson's Real Deal	ITV1	2006
7 February	Finders Keepers	Channel 5	2024
11 February	Wilderness with Simon Reeve	BBC Two	2024
21 February	The Daily Global	BBC News	2023
21 February	Breathtaking	ITV1	2024
22 February	Too Good to Be True	Channel 5	2024
29 February	Alice & Jack	Channel 4	2024
4 March	The Way	BBC One	2024
14 March	Love Rat	Channel 5	2024
21 March	Coma	Channel 5	2024
22 March	Fantasy Football League	BBC Two / ITV1 / Sky Max	1994 & 2022
27 March	Naked Attraction	Channel 4	2016
5 April	Alex Rider	Amazon Freevee	2020
13 April	Ant & Dec's Saturday Night Takeaway	ITV1	2002
28 April	This Town	BBC One	2024
6 May	World Business Report	BBC One / BBC Two / BBC News	1995
6 May	Asia Business Report	BBC One / BBC Two / BBC News	2003
17 May	A Gentleman in Moscow	Paramount+	2024
31 May	littleBe	ITVBe	2018
8 June	In for a Penny	ITV1	2019
12 June	The Misadventures of Romesh Ranganathan	BBC Two	2018
12 June	Inside No. 9	BBC Two	2014
17 June	Lost Boys and Fairies	BBC One	2024
10 July	The Night Caller	Channel 5	2024
11 July	Tell Me Everything	ITVX / ITV2	2022
18 July	Douglas Is Cancelled	ITV1	2024
22 July	The Jetty	BBC One	2024
4 August	McDonald & Dodds	ITV1	2020
16 August	Miriam Margoyles: A New Australian Adventure	BBC Two	2024
28 August	Kidnapped: The Chloe Ayling Story	BBC Three	2024
30 August	Tenable	ITV1	2016
12 September	The Rubbish World of Dave Spud	CITV / ITVX	2019
14 November	Doctors	BBC One	2000
25 December	Gavin & Stacey	BBC Three / BBC One	2007
26 December	Outnumbered	BBC One	2007
30 December	The Split	BBC One	2018

== Deaths ==
Date	Name	Age	Broadcast credibility
4 January	Georgina Hale	80	Actress (After the Dance, T-Bag)
4 January	Glynis Johns	100	Actress (Batman, Playhouse, Mary Poppins, Scooby-Doo and the Ghoul School)
4 January	David Soul	80	Actor (Starsky & Hutch, Here Come the Brides) and singer
11 January	Annie Nightingale	83	British DJ and television broadcaster (The Old Grey Whistle Test)
15 January	Charmian Abrahams	96	Actress (Crossroads)
16 January	Laurie Johnson	96	Theme tune composer (The Avengers, The Professionals, Animal Magic, This Is Your Life)
26 January	Richard Howard	79	Actor (Emmerdale Farm)
29 January (Note: Death announced on this date.)	Pat Webb	75	Reality show participant (Gogglebox)
2 February	Jonnie Irwin	50	English television presenter (A Place in the Sun, Escape to the Country, To Buy or Not to Buy)
2 February	Ian Lavender	77	English actor (Dad's Army, EastEnders)
5 February	Michael Jayston	88	Actor (Doctor Who, Emmerdale, Jane Eyre, Tinker Tailor Soldier Spy, Only Fools and Horses, Midsomer Murders)
12 February	Steve Wright	69	Presenter (Top of the Pops, Top of the Pops 2, The Steve Wright People Show)
15 February	Stuart Organ	72	Actor (Grange Hill, Doctor Who, Brookside, Holby City, Casualty)
19 February	Ewen MacIntosh	50	Actor and comedian (The Office, Little Britain, Miranda)
19 February	Robin Windsor	44	British dancer (Strictly Come Dancing)
21 February	Pamela Salem	80	Actress (Buccaneer, Into the Labyrinth, EastEnders, Doctor Who)
21 February	John Savident	86	Actor (Danger Man, The Saint, Callan, Doctor Who, Blake's 7, Yes Minister, Coronation Street)
23 February	Chris Gauthier	48	English-born Canadian actor (Earthsea, School of Life, Eureka, Harper's Island, Iron Invader, Once Upon a Time, A Series of Unfortunate Events, The Christmas House, Joe Pickett). He made guest appearances in Smallville, Level Up and Signed, Sealed, Delivered.
27 February	Michael Culver	85	English actor (The Empire Strikes Back, A Passage to India, The Adventures of Black Beauty, Cadfael)
28 February	Dave Myers	66	Presenter and (one half of The Hairy Bikers) (The Hairy Bikers' Cookbook, The Hairy Bikers' Food Tour of Britain, The Hairy Bikers' Asian Adventure)
3 March	Edward Bond	89	British dramatist and theatre director (Saved, Narrow Road to the Deep North, The Sea)
4 March	Tony Green	85	British sports commentator and television announcer (Bullseye)
6 March	Vikki Richards	79	British actress (Curse of the Crimson Altar, Zeta One, Black Snake)
15 March	Peter Kelly	82	Scottish actor (The Tall Guy, Welcome to Sarajevo).
23 March	David Capper	91	Northern Irish journalist and television reporter (BBC Ireland correspondent)
24 March	Kay Benbow	62	British television executive (CBeebies)
27 March	George Gilbey	40	English television personality (Gogglebox) and reality show contestant (Celebrity Big Brother)
30 March	Chance Perdomo	27	British actor (Midsomer Murders, Chilling Adventures of Sabrina, Gen V)
3 April	Adrian Schiller	60	English actor (Victoria, The Last Kingdom, Death in Paradise)
8 April	Sir Paul Fox	98	Television producer (BBC Television)
14 April	Vincent Friell	64	Scottish actor (Taggart, Rab C. Nesbitt, Still Game)
18 April	James Laurenson	84	New Zealand-born actor (Coronation Street, The Crown)
28 April	Stephen Grimason	67	Northern Irish journalist and editor of BBC News NI
28 April	Brian McCardie	59	Scottish actor (Rob Roy, Speed 2: Cruise Control, Ellie Parker, Line of Duty) and writer
2 May	Peter Oosterhuis	75	English golfer and broadcaster (Sky Sports, CBS Sports)
3 May	Dorothy Bromiley	93	British actress (The Girls of Pleasure Island, It's Great to Be Young, A Touch of the Sun)
5 May	Bernard Hill	79	English actor (The Lord of the Rings, Titanic, Boys from the Blackstuff)
6 May	Ian Gelder	74	British actor (Game of Thrones, Torchwood, Little Dorrit)
14 May	Gudrun Ure	98	Scottish actress (Super Gran)
2 June	Jeannette Charles	96	British actress (Saturday Night Live, Q..., Big Brother)
2 June	Harold Snoad	88	British television producer, writer and director (Keeping Up Appearances, Ever Decreasing Circles, Don't Wait Up, The Dick Emery Show)
3 June	William Russell	99	English actor (Doctor Who, Coronation Street, The Adventures of Sir Lancelot)
4 June	Nicholas Ball	78	English actor (Hazell, EastEnders, Footballers' Wives)
5 June	Rose-Marie	68	Northern Irish singer and television personality
5 June	Michael Mosley	67 (Note: Body found on this date.)	British television journalist and presenter (The One Show, The Story of Science: Power, Proof and Passion, The Genius of Invention)
9 June	Simon Cowell	72	British television presenter (Wildlife SOS) and conservationist, founder of Wildlife Aid Foundation
26 June	Pat Heywood	92	Scottish actress (Lucky Feller, Wuthering Heights, Inspector Morse, Root Into Europe)
4 July	Ysanne Churchman	99	English actress (Crossroads, Doctor Who, Softly, Softly)
5 July	Yvonne Furneaux	98	French-British actress (Danger Man, Hereward the Wake, The Baron)
6 July	Roberta Taylor	76	English actress (EastEnders, The Bill, Shakespeare & Hathaway: Private Investigators) and author
22 July	Beccy Barr	46	British journalist, TV presenter and firefighter
28 July	John Anderson	92	Scottish television referee (Gladiators)
2 August	John Clegg	90	British actor (It Ain't Half Hot Mum, Tom & Viv, Shooting Fish)
5 August	Ron Bain	79	Scottish actor (Naked Video)
9 August	Brian Marjoribanks	82	Scottish footballer (Hibernian), actor and broadcaster (BBC Scotland)
16 August	Robert Sidaway	82	English actor (Doctor Who, Crossroads)
1 September	Brian Trueman	92	English television presenter (ITV Granada) and writer (Danger Mouse, Count Duckula, Alias the Jester, Jamie and the Magic Torch)
10 September	Umar Mahmood	18	Reality show participant (Freddie Flintoff's Field of Dreams)
11 September	Kenneth Cope	93	English actor (Randall and Hopkirk (Deceased), Coronation Street)
15 September	Geoffrey Hinsliff	86	English actor (Coronation Street, Brass, Doctor Who)
16 September	Chris Serle	81	British television presenter (That's Life!, The Big Time, Windmill), reporter and actor
20 September	David Graham	99	English actor (Doctor Who, Thunderbirds, Peppa Pig, Ben and Holly's Little Kingdom)
20 September	Cleo Sylvestre	79	English actress (Till Death Us Do Part, Crossroads, The Bill)
27 September	Dame Maggie Smith	89	English actress (David Copperfield, Downton Abbey, My House in Umbria)
16 October	Liam Payne	31	English singer (One Direction) and contestant on The X Factor
26 October	Stephanie Collie	60	English costume designer (Peaky Blinders, My Lady Jane)
1 November	Alastair Down	68	English sports journalist (Channel 4 Racing)
2 November	Janey Godley	63	Scottish comedian (Have I Got News for You) and actress (River City)
3 November	Paul Engelen	75	British make-up artist (Game of Thrones)
8 November	June Spencer	105	Radio actress (The Archers)
12 November	Timothy West	90	English actor (EastEnders, Coronation Street) and presenter (Great Canal Journeys)
19 November	Ken Reid	69	Northern Irish journalist and political editor (UTV)
9 December	Arnold Yarrow	104	Actor (Doctor Who, EastEnders), screenwriter and novelist
12 December	Duncan Norvelle	66	Comedian (Through the Keyhole, Wogan, Surprise Surprise, The Bob Monkhouse Show, Bullseye, Blankety Blank and The Keith Harris Show)
19 December	Wincey Willis	76	Presenter (Good Morning Britain, Treasure Hunt)
25 December	Britt Allcroft	81	Writer and creator of Thomas & Friends, Magic Adventures of Mumfie
27 December	Olivia Hussey	73	Actress (Jesus of Nazareth)

== See also ==
- 2024 in British radio
