= 2021 Burnley Borough Council election =

UK local election

2021 local election results in Burnley

The 2021 Burnley Borough Council election took place on 6 May 2021 to elect members of Burnley Borough Council in England. This election was held on the same day as other local elections. As with many other local elections in England, it was postponed from May 2020, due to the COVID-19 pandemic. One third of the council was up for election, and each successful candidate will serve a three-year term of office, expiring in 2024. These seats were last contested in 2016.

Following the 2019 election, a coalition executive was formed by all the other parties after Labour lost control of the council. Led by Alan Hosker UKIP had collected all three seats in Hapton with Park ward after 2019. Its three councillors joined the Conservative group in 2020 with Hosker later being elected as group leader. A rupture occurred within the Conservative group later in the year, amidst Hosker's attempts to obtain a position on the executive for himself. This precipitated the collapse of the coalition in September 2020, with Labour's Mark Townsend temporally returning to the role of Council leader in a minority administration, but expected to stand down after the election to become Mayor.

Andrew Newhouse, who won Cliviger with Worsthorne for the Conservatives in 2016, defected to the Burnley and Padiham Independent Party shortly afterward. Bill Brindle, who won Coalclough and Deerplay for the Lib Dems in 2016 but (along with his wife) joined the Labour group in 2018, decided to retire rather than stand again. Mark Payne, who won Gannow for the Lib Dems in 2016, was one of the councillors who left the party over its stance on Brexit to form the Burnley and Padiham Independent Party in 2017. David Roper (Whittlefield with Ightenhill) who also left the party at that time but continued as an independent, was another who did not stand for re-election.

After the election the council remained in no overall control, with Labour's Afrasiab Anwar taking over from Mark Townsend as council leader in a coalition with the Lib Dems.

== State of the parties ==
After the election, the composition of the council (compared with May 2019) was:

Burnley Council composition 2021

Party	Seats	±
Labour	18	▼4
Conservative	9	▲5
Liberal Democrat	8	Steady
BAPIP	5	Steady
Green	5	▲3
UKIP	0	▼3
Independent	0	▼1

== Election results ==
=== Overall election result ===
Party	Councillors			Votes	
Party	Elected	Of total	Full Council		Of total
Labour Party	5	33.3%	18 / 45	7,719	34.5%
Conservative Party	4	26.7%	9 / 45	7,261	32.4%
Green Party	3	20.0%	5 / 45	3,755	16.8%
Liberal Democrats	2	13.3%	8 / 45	2,063	9.2%
Burnley and Padiham Independent Party	1	6.7%	5 / 45	1,529	6.8%
National Front	0	0.0%	0 / 45	45	0.2%
Social Democratic Party	0	0.0%	0 / 45	21	0.1%

== Ward results ==
=== Bank Hall ===
Bank Hall
Party	Candidate	Votes	%	±%
Labour	Lubna Khan	956	66.9	−3.3
Conservative	Maison McGowan-Doe	314	22.0	+9.9
Green	Julie Hurt	158	11.1	−6.6
Majority		642	44.9	−7.6
Turnout		1,428	34.1	
Labour hold		Swing		

=== Briercliffe ===
Briercliffe
Party	Candidate	Votes	%	±%
Liberal Democrats	Margaret Lishman	693	49.9	−12.8
Conservative	Mike Steel	404	29.1	+18.6
Labour	Shelagh Limmer	217	15.6	+1.3
Green	Victoria Alker	76	5.5	−4.8
Majority		289	20.8	−27.6
Turnout		1,390	32.0	
Liberal Democrats hold		Swing		

=== Brunshaw ===
Brunshaw
Party	Candidate	Votes	%	±%
Green	Andy Wight	462	38.7	+20.7
Conservative	Claire Ingham	399	33.4	+16.7
Labour Co-op	Lian Pate	333	27.9	−21.1
Majority		63	5.3	
Turnout		1,194	25.6	
Green gain from Labour		Swing		

=== Cliviger and Worsthorne ===
Cliviger and Worsthorne
Party	Candidate	Votes	%	±%
Green	Scott Cunliffe	959	47.1	+34.4
Conservative	Richard Piers	757	37.2	−9.1
Labour	Carol Lukey	152	7.5	−6.8
BAPIP	Andrew Newhouse	71	3.5	N/A
Liberal Democrats	Pippa Lishman	50	2.5	N/A
National Front	Steven Smith	45	2.2	N/A
Majority		202	9.9	
Turnout		2,034	47.4	
Green gain from Conservative		Swing		

=== Coalclough and Deerplay ===
Coalclough and Deerplay
Party	Candidate	Votes	%	±%
Liberal Democrats	Jacqueline Inckle	508	36.5	+6.6
Conservative	Linda Whittaker	323	23.2	+11.2
Labour	Bill Horrocks	322	23.1	−0.2
BAPIP	Jimmy Anderson	178	12.8	−14.7
Green	Arash Sedighi	60	4.3	−3.0
Majority		185	13.3	+10.9
Turnout		1,391	35.8	
Liberal Democrats hold		Swing		

=== Daneshouse and Stoneyholme ===
Daneshouse and Stoneyholme
Party	Candidate	Votes	%	±%
Labour	Saeed Chaudhary	1,376	70.6	−19.9
Liberal Democrats	Mohammed Hajji-Nazrul	461	23.6	N/A
Conservative	Tom Watson	70	3.6	−0.2
Green	Janet Hall	43	2.2	−3.5
Majority		915	47.0	−37.7
Turnout		1,950	—	
Labour hold		Swing		

=== Gannow ===
Gannow
Party	Candidate	Votes	%	±%
BAPIP	Mark Payne	508	40.4	−29.8
Labour	Fiona Wild	278	22.1	+6.7
Conservative	Darren Broughton	250	19.9	+12.1
Green	Jai Redman	152	12.1	+5.4
Liberal Democrats	Lesley Sumner	69	5.5	N/A
Majority		230	18.3	
Turnout		1,257	29.5	
BAPIP gain from Liberal Democrats		Swing		

=== Gawthorpe ===
Gawthorpe
Party	Candidate	Votes	%	±%
Conservative	Karen Ingham	776	56.0	+15.7
Labour	Kate Proctor	530	38.2	−2.7
Green	Joseph Davis	80	5.8	−2.0
Majority		246	17.8	
Turnout		1,386	30.7	
Conservative gain from Labour		Swing		

=== Hapton with Park ===
Hapton with Park
Party	Candidate	Votes	%	±%
Conservative	Alan Hosker	1,256	73.8	+63.1
Labour	Alun Lewis	340	20.0	−0.8
Green	Duncan Reed	106	6.2	−13.2
Majority		916	53.8	
Turnout		1,702	36.8	
Conservative gain from UKIP		Swing		

=== Lanehead ===
Lanehead
Party	Candidate	Votes	%	±%
Labour	Asif Raja	863	50.1	−0.1
Conservative	Jamie McGowan	667	38.7	+27.8
Green	Mark Alker	194	11.3	+0.5
Majority		196	11.4	−10.6
Turnout		1,724	37.8	
Labour hold		Swing		

=== Queensgate ===
Queensgate
Party	Candidate	Votes	%	±%
Labour	Arif Khan	1,105	64.5	−1.2
Conservative	Alfie White	444	25.9	+14.1
Green	Helen Bridges	163	9.5	−1.2
Majority		661	38.6	−15.0
Turnout		1,712	41.1	
Labour hold		Swing		

=== Rosegrove with Lowerhouse ===
Rosegrove with Lowerhouse
Party	Candidate	Votes	%	±%
Labour Co-op	Marcus Johnstone	387	30.5	−0.1
Conservative	Joanne Broughton	353	27.8	+17.5
BAPIP	Dave Alexander	352	27.7	−20.8
Liberal Democrats	Michael Taylor	109	8.6	N/A
Green	Jane Davis	69	5.4	−5.2
Majority		34	2.7	
Turnout		1,270	25.8	
Labour Co-op hold		Swing		

=== Rosehill with Burnley Wood ===
Rosehill with Burnley Wood
Party	Candidate	Votes	%	±%
Conservative	Phil Chamberlain	420	31.6	+22.3
Labour	Margaret Brindle	411	30.9	+8.5
Liberal Democrats	Peter McCann	379	28.5	−13.1
Green	Tony Davis	120	9.0	+2.2
Majority		9	0.7	
Turnout		1,330	29.5	
Conservative gain from Liberal Democrats		Swing		

=== Trinity ===
Trinity
Party	Candidate	Votes	%	±%
Green	Martyn Hurt	634	57.4	−9.1
Labour Co-op	Tony Martin	242	21.9	+3.8
Conservative	Susan Nutter	162	14.7	+11.7
BAPIP	Stephanie Forrest	67	6.1	−3.1
Majority		392	35.5	
Turnout		1,105	26.9	
Green gain from Labour		Swing		

=== Whittlefield with Ightenhill ===
Whittlefield with Ightenhill
Party	Candidate	Votes	%	±%
Conservative	Don Whitaker	666	36.8	+14.4
Green	Emma Simpkin	479	26.5	−6.5
BAPIP	Nicola Sedgwick	353	19.5	−13.6
Labour	Shaun Sproule	207	11.4	+3.2
Liberal Democrats	Kathryn Haworth	83	4.6	+1.3
SDP	Mitchell Cryer	21	1.2	N/A
Majority		187	10.3	
Turnout		1,809	39.3	
Conservative gain from Liberal Democrats		Swing		
