= Mammals (2024 TV series) =

British nature documentary television series

- Genre: Nature documentary
- Presented by: David Attenborough
- Country of origin: United Kingdom
- Original language: English
- No. of episodes: 6

Production
- Executive producer: Roger Webb
- Producer: Scott Alexander
- Running time: 60 minutes
- Production company: BBC Studios Natural History Unit

Original release
- Network: BBC One
- Release: 31 March – 5 May 2024

Mammals is a British nature documentary series produced by the BBC Studios Natural History Unit for BBC Television, first aired on BBC One in 2024. The narrator is David Attenborough, the series producer is Scott Alexander and the executive producer is Roger Webb.

The six-part series explores how mammals have adapted to thrive in a diverse range of habitats, along with the increasing challenges they face as these habitats are threatened or shaped by human activity. The first episode, "Dark", explains how and why the majority of mammal species have evolved to become nocturnal. The following episodes are each themed around a particular ecosystem: the built environment, aquatic habitats, polar regions, hot climates and forests.

== Production ==
Mammals was announced by the BBC in February 2023 alongside two other natural history commissions: Big Little Journeys and Wild Scandinavia. The series was commissioned by BBC Factual, produced by the BBC Studios Natural History Unit and co-produced by France Télévisions, ZDF and BBC America.

In February 2024, it was announced that David Attenborough would present the series, returning to a subject he first covered in The Life of Mammals in 2002. In addition to revealing Attenborough's involvement, BBC Studios announced international pre-sales of Mammals to China (Youku, which also joined as a co-producer), Denmark (DR), Estonia (ERR), Japan (NHK), Norway (NRK), Spain (Movistar Plus+) and Sweden (SVT).

== Broadcast ==
The series debuted on British television on 31 March 2024, broadcast on BBC One and streamed on BBC iPlayer. Subsequent episodes were shown in the same Sunday evening timeslot each week. In the United States, Mammals premiered on BBC America beginning 13 July 2024. Each episode was made available on AMC+ the same day.

== Episodes ==
| No. | Title | Produced by | Original release date | UK viewers (millions) |
|---|---|---|---|---|
| 1 | "Dark" | Stuart Armstrong | 31 March 2024 | 4.955 |
| 2 | "The New Wild" | Lydia Baines | 7 April 2024 | 4.310 |
| 3 | "Water" | Daniel Rasmussen | 14 April 2024 | 4.288 |
| 4 | "Cold" | Will Lawson | 21 April 2024 | 3.755 |
| 5 | "Heat" | Rob Pilley | 28 April 2024 | 3.795 |
| 6 | "Forest" | Justine Allan | 5 May 2024 | 3.421 |
