= Inventions That Changed the World =

2004 BBC documentary series

- Each opening title is relevant to its subject matter, in this case the Jet
- Created by: Jeremy Clarkson
- Directed by: Neil Ferguson
- Starring: Jeremy Clarkson
- Country of origin: United Kingdom
- Original language: English
- No. of episodes: 5

Production
- Producer: Michael Mosley
- Running time: 60 minutes

Original release
- Network: BBC Two
- Release: 15 January – 12 February 2004

Inventions That Changed the World is a five-part BBC Two documentary series presented by Jeremy Clarkson. First broadcast on 15 January 2004, the programme takes a look at some of the inventions that helped to shape the modern world. The UKTV channel Yesterday frequently repeats this series. However, episodes are edited to 46 minutes to allow for commercials to air in the one-hour time slot. Originally planned for a 6-part run, only 5 episodes were broadcast.

== Episodes ==
No.	Title	Original release date	Prod. code
1	"The Gun"	15 January 2004	LSFR847E
Clarkson tells us all about guns.
2	"The Computer"	22 January 2004	LSFR849S
Clarkson reveals the origins of the computer and the recent areas of artificial intelligence.
3	"The Jet"	29 January 2004	LSFR846K
Clarkson shows how much the Jet has changed the world by traveling around the world in 5 days.
4	"The Telephone"	5 February 2004	LSFR845R
Clarkson gives the details of the first telephones and shows how much has changed since its invention.
5	"The Television"	12 February 2004	LSFR848Y
Finally Clarkson reveals the invention of the television and how it affected the world since its invention.

== Reception ==
A Daily Telegraph review of "The Television" episode called it "enjoyable and wittily written" in an "ironic and debunking" tone.

== See also ==
- Inventions of America
- Inventions of the Islamic Golden Age
