= Intermittent fasting =

Various systems to schedule meals

Intermittent fasting (IF) is any of various meal timing schedules that cycle between voluntary fasting (or reduced calorie intake) and non-fasting over a given period. Methods of intermittent fasting include alternate-day fasting, periodic fasting, such as the 5:2 diet, and daily time-restricted eating.

Intermittent fasting has been studied to find whether it can reduce the risk of diet-related diseases, such as metabolic syndrome. It may improve several health outcomes in overweight or obese adults; its effect on lowering blood pressure appears to be less pronounced than that of continuous energy restriction. There is preliminary evidence that intermittent fasting is generally safe.

Adverse effects of intermittent fasting have not been comprehensively studied, leading some academics to point out its risk as a dietary fad. The United States National Institute on Aging states that current research is limited and inconclusive; they do not recommend intermittent fasting to the general public. The New Zealand Ministry of Health states that intermittent fasting may aid weight loss but is not recommended for people with insulin-dependent diabetes and can cause low energy and hunger.

Fasting exists in various religious practices, including Buddhism, Christianity, Hinduism, Islam, Jainism, and Judaism.

== History ==
Fasting is an ancient tradition, having been practiced by many cultures and religions over centuries.

Therapeutic intermittent fasts for the treatment of obesity have been investigated since at least 1915, with a renewed interest in the medical community in the 1960s after Bloom and his colleagues published an "enthusiastic report". Intermittent fasts, or "short-term starvation periods", ranged from 1 to 14 days in these early studies. This enthusiasm penetrated lay magazines, which prompted researchers and clinicians to caution about the use of intermittent fasts without medical monitoring.

== Types ==
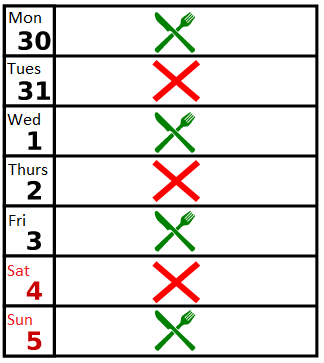
Intermittent fasting calendar for 1 week, alternating feasting days (green), in which the person eats a normal diet, with fasting days (red), in which the person performs intermittent fasting

There are multiple methods of intermittent fasting.

- Time-restricted eating involves eating only during a certain number of hours each day, often establishing a consistent daily pattern of caloric intake within an 8–12-hour time window. This schedule may align food intake with circadian rhythms (establishing eating windows that begin after sunrise and end around sunset).
  - One-meal-a-day fasting is consuming all daily macronutrients within a single 1-2 hour eating window, with only water or non-caloric beverages, vitamins, minerals and medication allowed to be taken during the remaining hours.
- Alternate-day fasting involves alternating between a 24-hour "fast day" when the person eats less than 25% of usual energy needs, followed by a 24-hour non-fasting "feast day" period. There are two subtypes:
  - Complete alternate-day fasting is total intermittent energy restriction (IER vs. CER = continuous energy restriction), where no calories are consumed on fasting days.
  - Modified alternate-day fasting (mADF) involves partial intermittent energy restriction which allows the consumption of up to 25% of daily calorie needs on fasting days instead of complete fasting. This is akin to alternating days with normal eating and days with a very-low-calorie diet.
- 5:2 diet is a type of periodic fasting (that does not follow a particular food pattern) which focuses entirely on calorie content. In other words, two days of the week are devoted to consumption of approximately 500 to 600 calories, or about 25% of regular daily caloric intake, with normal calorie intake during the other five days of the week. It was first documented in a 2011 article co-authored by Michelle Harvie, Mark Mattson, and 14 additional scientists. It was later published in the UK and Australia by Michael Mosley through the 2012 BBC documentary Eat, Fast and Live Longer (where he learned about the 5:2 diet from Mark Mattson). It also became common in Australia.
- Periodic fasting or whole-day fasting involves intermittent periods of water fasting longer than 24 hours.

The science concerning intermittent fasting is preliminary and uncertain due to an absence of studies on its long-term effects. Preliminary evidence indicates that intermittent fasting may be effective for weight loss, may decrease insulin resistance and fasting insulin, and may improve cardiovascular and metabolic health, although the long term sustainability of these effects has not been studied.

== Research ==
Intermittent fasting may improve several health outcomes in overweight or obese adults. It may reduce waist circumference, fat mass, low-density lipoprotein cholesterol, triacylglycerols, total cholesterol, and fasting insulin. It may also slightly lower systolic blood pressure and increase high-density lipoprotein cholesterol and fat-free mass. Its effect on lowering blood pressure appears to be less pronounced than that of continuous energy restriction.

=== Body weight and metabolic disease risk ===
There is limited evidence that intermittent fasting produces weight loss comparable to a calorie-restricted diet. Most studies on intermittent fasting in humans have observed weight loss, ranging from 2.5% to 9.9%.

The reductions in body weight can be attributed to the loss of fat mass and some lean mass. For time restricted eating the ratio of weight loss is 4:1 for fat mass to lean mass, respectively. Alternate-day fasting does not affect lean body mass, although one review found a small decrease.

Alternate-day fasting improves cardiovascular and metabolic biomarkers similarly to a calorie restriction diet in people who are overweight, obese or have metabolic syndrome. As of 2021, it remains uncertain whether intermittent fasting could prevent cardiovascular disease.

Intermittent fasting has not been studied in children, elderly, or underweight people, and may be harmful in these populations. Intermittent fasting is not recommended for people who are not overweight, and the long-term sustainability of intermittent fasting is unknown as of 2018.

A 2021 review found that moderate alternate-day fasting for two to six months was associated with reductions of body weight, body mass index, and cardiometabolic risk factors in overweight or obese adults.

=== Cognition ===
A 2025 review found no consistent effect of short-term fasting (12 hours) on cognitive performance across various tasks, including attention, working memory, inhibitory control, cognitive flexibility, and long-term memory. The review concluded that cognitive function remains stable during short-term fasting, indicating that skipping breakfast or time-restricted eating do not impair thinking skills or concentration in adults.

=== Other effects ===
==== Cancer and other diseases ====
Intermittent fasting is not recommended to treat cancer in France, the United Kingdom, or the United States, although a few small-scale clinical studies suggest that it may reduce chemotherapy side effects. Periodic fasting may have a minor effect on chronic pain and mood disorders.

==== Exercise ====
Athletic performance does not benefit from intermittent fasting. Overnight fasting before exercise increases lipolysis, but reduces performance in prolonged exercise (more than 60 min).

=== Side effects ===
There is preliminary evidence that intermittent fasting appears safe for people without diabetes or eating disorders.

Reviews of preliminary clinical studies found that short-term intermittent fasting may produce minor side effects, such as continuous feelings of hunger, irritability, dizziness, nausea, headaches, and impaired thinking, although these effects disappear within a month from beginning the fasting practice. A 2018 systematic review found no major adverse effects. Intermittent fasting is not recommended for pregnant or breastfeeding women, growing children and adolescents, the elderly, or individuals with or vulnerable to eating disorders.

=== Tolerance ===
Tolerance of a diet is a determinant of the potential effectiveness and maintenance of benefits obtained, such as weight loss or biomarker improvement. A 2019 review found that drop-out rates varied widely from 2% to 38% for intermittent fasting, and from 0% to 50% for calorie restriction diet.

=== Possible mechanisms ===
Preliminary research indicates that fasting may induce a transition through four states:

1. The fed state or absorptive state during satiety, when the primary fuel source is glucose and body fat storage is active, lasting for about 4 hours;
2. The postabsorptive state, lasting for up to 18 hours, when glucagon is secreted and the body uses liver glucose reserves as a fuel source;
3. The fasted state, transitioning progressively to other reserves, such as fat, lactic acid, and alanine, as fuel sources, when the liver glucose reserves are depleted, occurring after 12 to 36 hours of continued fast;
4. The shift from preferential lipid synthesis and fat storage, to the mobilization of fat (in the form of free fatty acids), metabolized into fatty acid-derived ketones to provide energy. Some authors call this transition the "metabolic switch".

A 2019 review of weight-change interventions, including alternate day fasting, time-restricted feeding, exercise and overeating, found that body weight homeostasis could not precisely correct "energetic errors" – the loss or gain of calories – in the short-term.

Another pathway for effects of meal timing on metabolism lies in the influence of the circadian rhythm over the endocrine system, especially on glucose metabolism and leptin. Preliminary studies found that eating when melatonin is secreted – during darkness and commonly when sleeping at night – is associated with increased glucose levels in young healthy adults, and obesity and cardiovascular disorders in less healthy individuals. Reviews on obesity prevention concluded that "meal timing appears as a new potential target in weight control strategies" and suggest that "timing and content of food intake, physical activity, and sleep may be modulated to counteract" circadian and metabolic genetic predispositions to obesity.

=== Intermittent feeding ===
Other feeding schemes, such as hypocaloric feeding and intermittent feeding, also called bolus feeding were under study. A 2019 meta-analysis found that intermittent feeding may be more beneficial for premature infants, although better designed studies are required to devise clinical practices. In adults, reviews have not found intermittent feeding to increase glucose variability or gastrointestinal intolerance. A meta-analysis found intermittent feeding had no influence on gastric residual volumes and aspiration, pneumonia, mortality nor morbidity in people with a trauma, but increased the risk of diarrhea.

=== Food production ===
Intermittent fasting, or "skip-a-day" feeding, is supposedly the most common feeding strategy for poultry in broiler breeder farms worldwide, as an alternative to adding bulky fibers to the diet to reduce growth. It is perceived as welfare-reducing and thus illegal in several European countries including Sweden. Intermittent fasting in poultry appears to increase food consumption but reduce appetitive behaviors such as foraging.

== Religious fasting ==
Some different types of fastings exist in some religious practices. These include the Black Fast of Christianity (commonly practiced during Lent), Vrata (Hinduism), Ramadan (Islam), Yom Kippur (Judaism), Fast Sunday (The Church of Jesus Christ of Latter-day Saints), Jain fasting, and Buddhist fasting. Religious fasting practices may only require abstinence from certain foods or last for a short period of time and cause negligible effects.

=== Hinduism ===
A Vrata/Nombu is observed either as an independent private ritual at a date of one's choice, as part of a particular ceremony such as wedding, or as a part of a major festival such as Diwali (Lakshmi, festival of lights), Shivaratri (Shiva), Navratri (Durga or Rama), Kandasashti (Muruga), Ekadashi (Krishna, Vishnu avatars).

=== Christianity ===
In Christianity, many adherents of Christian denominations including Catholics, Lutherans, Methodists, Anglicans, and the Orthodox, often observe the Friday Fast throughout the year, which commonly includes abstinence from meat. Throughout the liturgical season of Lent (and especially on Ash Wednesday and Good Friday) in the Christian calendar, many Christians practice a form of intermittent fasting in which one can consume two collations and one full meal; others practice the Black Fast, in which no food or water is consumed until after sunset with prayer.

=== Buddhism ===
In Buddhism, fasting is undertaken as part of the monastic training of Theravada Buddhist monks, who fast daily from noon to sunrise of the next day. This daily fasting pattern may be undertaken by laypeople following the eight precepts.

=== Islam ===
During Ramadan, Islamic practices are similar to intermittent fasting by not eating or drinking from dawn until sunset, while permitting food intake in the morning before dawn and in the evening after dusk for 30 days. A meta-analysis on the health of Muslims during Ramadan shows significant weight loss during the fasting period of up to 1.51 kilograms (3.3 lb), but this weight was regained within about two weeks thereafter. The analysis concluded that "Ramadan provides an opportunity to lose weight, but structured and consistent lifestyle modifications are necessary to achieve lasting weight loss." One review found similarities between Ramadan and time-restricted feeding, with the main dissimilarity being the disallowance of water drinking with Islamic fasting. In a 2020 review, Ramadan fasting caused a significant decrease in LDL cholesterol levels, and a slight decline in total cholesterol.

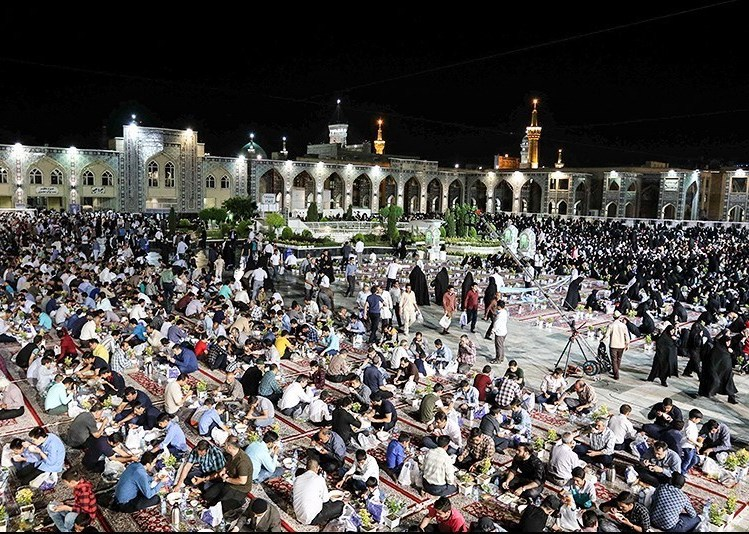
Iftar serving for fasting people in the Imam Reza shrine

Ramadan disallows fluids during the fasting period. This type of fasting would be hazardous for pregnant women, as it is associated with risks of inducing labor and causing gestational diabetes, although it does not appear to affect the child's weight. For these reasons, pregnant women, as well as children who have not reached puberty, the elderly, those who are physically or mentally incapable of fasting, travelers, and breast-feeding mothers are often exempt from religious fasting – Ramadan being one example. Ramadan diurnal intermittent fasting is associated with healthier lifestyle behaviors and a reduction in smoking rate by more than 50% among university students.

== Guidelines ==
=== United States ===
The American Heart Association (AHA) says that as with other "popular or fad diets", there is no good evidence of heart health benefits from intermittent fasting.

The American Diabetes Association "found limited evidence about the safety and/or effects of intermittent fasting on type 1 diabetes" and preliminary results of weight loss for type 2 diabetes, and so does not recommend any specific dietary pattern for the management of diabetes until more research is done, recommending instead that "health care providers should focus on the key factors that are common among the patterns".

The National Institute on Aging states current human research is limited, inconclusive, and not enough to recommend these diets for the general public.

=== Europe ===
Given the lack of advantage and the increased incidence of diarrhea, European guidelines do not recommend intermittent feeding for people in intensive care units.

==== United Kingdom ====
According to NHS Choices, people considering the 5:2 diet should first consult a physician, as fasting can sometimes be unsafe.

=== New Zealand ===
The New Zealand's Ministry of Health considers that intermittent fasting can be advised by doctors to some people, except diabetics, stating that these "diets can be as effective as other energy-restricted diets, and some people may find them easier to stick to" but there are possible side effects during fasting days such as "hunger, low energy levels, light-headedness and poor mental functioning" and note that healthy food must be chosen on non-fasting days.

== Usage trends ==
Intermittent fasting is a common fad diet, attracting celebrity endorsements and public interest.

=== UK and Australia ===
Intermittent fasting (specifically the 5:2 diet) was popularized by Michael Mosley in the UK and Australia in 2012 after the BBC2 television Horizon documentary Eat, Fast and Live Longer.

=== North America ===
In the United States, intermittent fasting became a trend in Silicon Valley, California. It was the most popular diet in 2018, according to a survey by the International Food Information Council.

=== Commercial activity ===
As of 2019, interest in intermittent fasting led some companies to commercialize diet coaching, dietary supplements, and full meal packages. These companies were criticized for offering expensive products or services that were not backed by science.

== See also ==
- List of diets
