= Michael Mosley =

British television presenter (1957–2024)

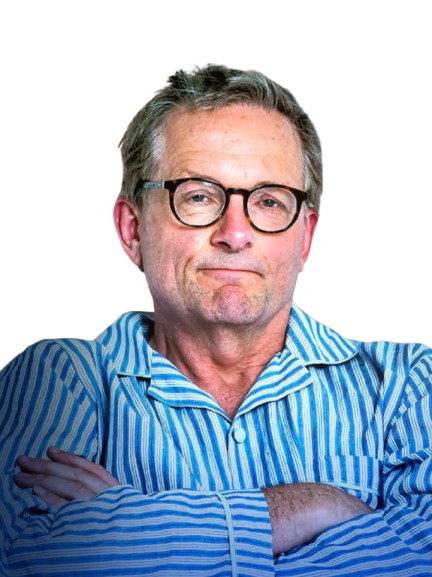
- Mosley in 2024
- Born: Michael Hugh Mosley; 22 March 1957; Calcutta, India
- Died: 5 June 2024 (aged 67); Agia Marina, Symi, Greece
- Citizenship: United Kingdom
- Education: New College, Oxford; Royal Free Hospital Medical School
- Occupations: Television and radio journalist; producer; and presenter
- Years active: 1985–2024
- Television: Trust Me, I'm a Doctor
- Spouse: Clare Bailey (m. 1987)
- Children: 4
- Awards: Medical Journalist of the Year – British Medical Association (1995)
- Website: michaelmosley.co.uk

Michael Hugh Mosley (22 March 1957 – 5 June 2024) was a British television and radio journalist, producer, presenter and writer who worked for the BBC from 1985 until his death. He presented television programmes on biology and medicine and regularly appeared on The One Show. Mosley was an advocate of intermittent fasting and low-carbohydrate diets who wrote books promoting the ketogenic diet.

He died on the Greek island of Symi on 5 June 2024 at the age of 67.

== Early life and education ==
Michael Hugh Mosley was born in Calcutta, India, on 22 March 1957, the son of Arthur Daryl Alexander George "Bill" Mosley and Joan Stewart. He had an older brother and a younger brother and sister. His father was a banker born in George Town, Penang, of partly Armenian descent. His maternal grandfather, Arthur Dudley Stewart, was an Anglican priest and Principal of St. Paul's College, Hong Kong, born to Irish missionary parents in China. Mosley's maternal great-grandfather, Gerard Lander, was Anglican Bishop of Victoria (Hong Kong).

Mosley attended boarding school in England from the age of seven. After attending Haileybury College, a boarding and day public school (at the time for boys only), at Hertford Heath in Hertfordshire, he read Philosophy, politics and economics at New College, Oxford, including investment banking, before working for two years as a banker in the City of London. He then decided to move into medicine, intending to become a psychiatrist, and studied at the Royal Free Hospital Medical School (now part of UCL Medical School). He became disillusioned with psychiatry after a placement in the specialty during his degree course, and decided not to practise medicine after passing his final examinations in 1985.

Mosley described himself as "quite religious" until around the age of 20 and considered becoming a priest.

== Career ==
After graduating in medicine, Mosley elected not to pursue a career as a doctor, but instead joined a trainee assistant producer scheme at the BBC in 1985. Mosley was a joint executive producer for a number of science programmes, including programmes with Robert Winston, The Human Face presented by John Cleese, and the 2004 BBC Two engineering series Inventions That Changed the World hosted by Jeremy Clarkson. His career in front of the camera began in 2007, when he pitched a series for BBC television titled Medical Mavericks and, unable to find a suitable host, offered to present it himself. He went on to present numerous programmes for TV, including Blood and Guts, The Story of Science, Make Me, and Trust Me, I'm a Doctor.

In 2011, Mosley made a series titled The Brain: A Secret History on the history of psychology and neuroscience. During the series, while describing the methods that are being employed to identify the anomalies in brain structure associated with psychopathy, his personal test results revealed he himself had these candidate brain characteristics.

Mosley presented a two-part documentary, Frontline Medicine, in 2011, with episodes titled "Survival" and "Rebuilding Lives". These programmes described the recent medical advancements that allowed for improved treatment of military personnel injured in battle in Afghanistan, and examined how these new techniques were being used in emergency medicine in civilian casualties in the United States and Great Britain.

Mosley's documentary The Truth About Exercise, first broadcast in 2012, highlighted how different patterns of exercise might help achieve health benefits, the danger of sitting for prolonged periods and revealed how certain genotypes are unable to gain significant improvements in aerobic fitness (VO_{2} max) by following endurance exercise programmes. His own genetic type can gain many of the benefits of exercise, primarily improved insulin response, through short, high-intensity training sessions as suggested by the research of James Timmons.

In January 2013, Mosley presented The Genius of Invention. In the documentary named The Truth About Personality, which first aired on 10 July 2013, Mosley explored what science can tell people about optimism and pessimism and whether people can change their outlook.

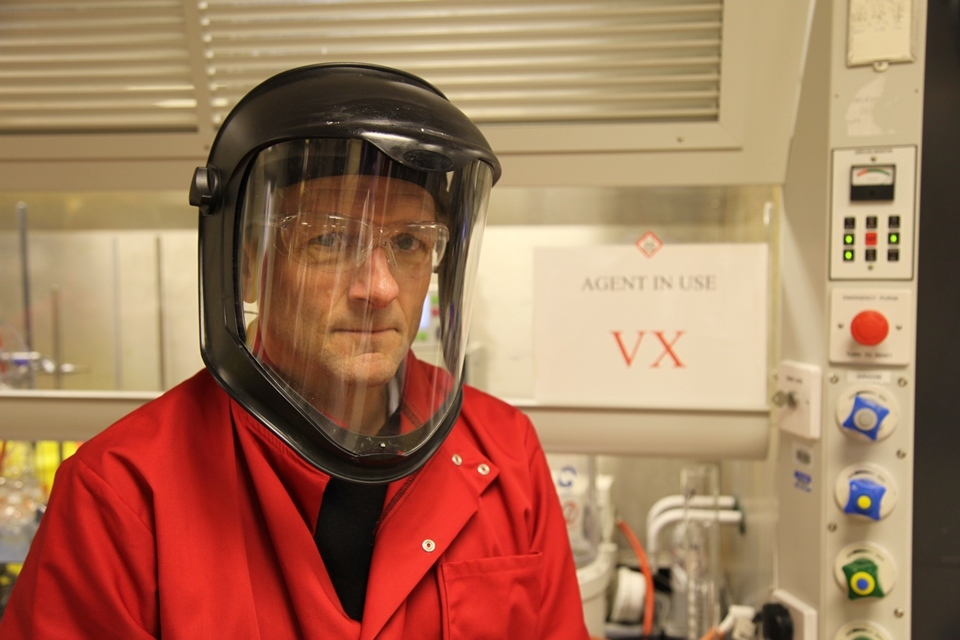
Mosley during the filming of his 2016 documentary Inside Porton Down

In 2016 he presented the BBC Four documentary Inside Porton Down: Britain's Secret Weapons Research Facility.

Mosley, along with a group of medical specialists, presented a BBC Two documentary series titled The Diagnostic Detectives which aired in 2020. In the series, each programme is centred around the group of doctors who choose to tackle a patient's problem.

In 2021, Mosley presented a three-part series, Lose a Stone in 21 Days, for Channel 4. On the programme Mosley suggested that people could lose a stone (14 lb; 6.4 kg) in 21 days by calorie restriction to only 800 calories a day. This advice was considered dangerous by some medical experts and the programme received criticism on social media platforms. Beat, a UK charity supporting those affected by eating disorders, wrote the following day that "the programme caused enough stress and anxiety to our beneficiaries that we extended our Helpline hours to support anyone affected and received 51% more contact during that time".

Mosley presented the series Just One Thing on BBC Radio 4, in which each episode explored a single action a person could take to improve their health. Suggestions covered a wide range including reading poetry out loud, taking hot baths in the evening, playing a musical instrument, Nordic walking, and cooking tomatoes to increase their health benefits. The series launched in March 2021; as of 9 June 2024, 102 episodes had been broadcast with three more, sharing the title "Exercise Clever", scheduled for 13, 20 and 27 June 2024. These were later pulled. An interview he recorded at the Hay Festival less than a fortnight before his death was broadcast as part of the series and as a tribute to him. In it, he was praised as "one of the most important broadcasters of recent decades" and he confessed that he found it challenging to practise many of the health tips he had advocated on his programmes and that he had found the results of a personality test confronting.

== Intermittent fasting and low-carbohydrate diet advocacy ==
Mosley promoted intermittent fasting and was a low-carbohydrate diet advocate.

=== 5:2 diet ===
Mosley was credited with popularising a form of intermittent fasting called the 5:2 diet through an episode of the BBC documentary series Horizon called "Eat, Fast and Live Longer".

It was through this documentary that he learned about the 5:2 diet from neuroscientist Mark Mattson who published a paper on the diet with Michelle Harvie and 14 other scientists in 2011. In the original trials, the 5:2 diet does not follow a particular food pattern, but instead focuses entirely on calorie content.

In early 2013 his book The Fast Diet, written with Mimi Spencer, was published by Short Books.

=== The Fast 800 diet ===
Mosley advocated The Fast 800 Diet, a low-carbohydrate Mediterranean diet with intermittent fasting that follows a daily 800-calorie eating plan. His book The Fast 800 Keto combines a ketogenic diet with intermittent fasting.

Mosley's The Fast 800 Keto advises a three-stage diet plan for weight loss: stage 1, a very low-carbohydrate ketogenic diet; stage 2, a reintroduction of carbohydrates with intermittent fasting; stage 3, a low-carbohydrate Mediterranean diet.

Red Pen Reviews gave Mosley's book The Fast 800 Keto a score of 58% for scientific accuracy, but concluded that the diet "should cause weight loss and improve health in most people who have extra weight and/or type 2 diabetes, but some aspects of the diet may be unnecessary and make it harder to follow". The review also noted that Mosley's Fast 800 Keto is not a long-term ketogenic diet and the insistence on a low-carbohydrate intake for the long-term Mediterranean diet is not necessary.

== Awards and honours ==
Mosley's 1994 Horizon documentary "Ulcer Wars" reported the link between Helicobacter pylori and gastric ulcers, discovered in 1983 by Australian scientists Robin Warren and Barry Marshall. He was named Medical Journalist of the Year in 1995 by the British Medical Association. In 1996 the programme was noted as one of the most important factors to influence British general practitioners' prescribing habits.

In 2002, Mosley was nominated for an Emmy as an executive producer for The Human Face with John Cleese. In 2017, Mosley was awarded an honorary doctorate of Science by the University of Edinburgh.

== Personal life ==
Mosley married Clare Bailey Mosley in 1987. She was a general practitioner until her retirement in 2022; they had met at the Royal Free Hospital Medical School and had a daughter and three sons.

In a 2019 BBC documentary on sleep, Mosley revealed he had chronic insomnia. His book Fast Asleep, on the subject, was published by Atria that same year.

== Death ==
On 5 June 2024, Mosley went missing on the Greek island of Symi while on holiday with his wife. He left St. Nikolas beach to walk to Symi Town, approximately two miles (three kilometres) away, where they were staying. His body was found on 9 June, on the rocky slope outside the wall of a private resort called Agia Marina. It appeared that he had taken the wrong path after leaving the town of Pedi. His body was found after being spotted by a British journalist who was on a boat with the mayor and ERT TV journalists. It was located 100 yards (90 m) from a restaurant and 150 yards (140 m) from an area earlier searched by his four children, who had all flown out to support the search. Mosley was found with his legs raised on a rock, probably to prevent himself from fainting.

An initial post-mortem established that, based on the position of his body and the lack of any fatal injury, Mosley had likely died from natural causes at around 4 pm on the day he disappeared. Toxicology and histology reports were anticipated. An inquest, held in Buckinghamshire in December 2024, reported that the cause of his death was "unascertainable" and that his death was "most likely attributable either to heat stroke (accidental) or non-identified pathological cause".

== Television ==
Year	Title	Channel	Notes
2007	Medical Mavericks	BBC Four	
2008	Blood and Guts	BBC Two	
2009	Make Me	BBC One	
2010	The Brain – A Secret History	BBC Four	
2010	The Story of Science: Power, Proof and Passion	BBC Two	Six-part series.
2010	Pleasure and Pain	BBC One	
2010	The Young Ones	BBC One	
2011	Frontline Medicine	BBC Two	
2011	10 Things to You Need to Know About Losing Weight	BBC One	
2011	Inside the Human Body	BBC One	Four-part series and a Best of Series episode.
2012	Guts: The Strange and Mysterious World of the Human Stomach	BBC Four	Also referred to as Inside Michael Mosley.
2012	Eat, Fast and Live longer	BBC Two	
2012	Truth About Exercise	BBC Two	
2013	The One Show	BBC One	Topical films about science.
2013	Pain, Pus and Poison: The Search for Modern Medicines	BBC Four	Three-part series.
2013	Winter Viruses and How to Beat Them	BBC Two	Co-presented with Alice Roberts.
2013	The Genius of Invention	BBC Two	Four-part series. Co-presented with Mark Miodownik and Cassie Newland.
2013	The Truth About Personality	BBC Two	A Horizon (BBC TV series) documentary.
2013–2020	Trust Me, I'm a Doctor	BBC Two	
2014	Infested! Living with Parasites	BBC Four	
2014	Should I Eat Meat?	BBC Two	Total of two episodes as a part of Horizon 2014–2015 series.
2015	Is Your Brain Male or Female	BBC Two	Episode 7 of Horizon 2014–2015 series.
2015	Countdown to Life: the Extraordinary Making of You	BBC Two	Three-part series.
2015	Are Health Tests Really a Good Idea?	BBC Two	
2015	The Wonderful World of Blood	BBC Four	
2016	E-Cigarettes: Miracle or Menace?	BBC Two	
2016	Inside Porton Down: Britain's Secret Weapons Research Facility	BBC Four	
2016	The Victorian Slum	BBC Two	Five-part series.
2017	Meet the Humans	BBC Earth	Five-part series.
2017	The Secrets of Your Food	BBC Two	Three-part series. Co-presented with James Wong.
2021	21 Day Body Turnaround with Michael Mosley	Channel 4	Three-part series.
2021	Lose a Stone in 21 Days with Michael Mosley	Channel 4	Three-part series.
2021	Australia's Health Revolution	SBS	Three-part series tackling type 2 diabetes in Australia.
2022	Michael Mosley: Who Made Britain Fat?	Channel 4	Two-part series.
2022	Horizon: How to Sleep Well	BBC Two	
2023	Secrets of the Superagers	SBS	Six-part series.
2024	Australia's Sleep Revolution	SBS	Three part series. In partnership with Flinders University.
2024	Michael Mosley: Secrets of Your Big Shop	Channel 4	Four-part series.
2024	Michael Mosley: Wonders of the Human Body	Channel 5	Three-part series. Mosley's final TV series.
2024	Just One Thing	BBC One	Two-part series. Televised adaptation of Mosley's BBC Radio 4 series Just One Thing.
2024	Michael Mosley: The Doctor Who Changed Britain	BBC One	Posthumous appearance. Narrated by Hannah Fry.

== Radio ==
Year	Title	Channel	Notes
2021–2024	Just One Thing	BBC Radio 4	105 15-minute episodes

== See also ==
- List of solved missing person cases (post-2000)

== Selected publications ==
- Mosley, Michael; Spencer, Mimi (2013). The Fast Diet: The Secret of Intermittent Fasting – Lose Weight, Stay Healthy, Live Longer. London: Short Books. ISBN 9781780721675.
- Mosley, Michael; Bee, Peta (2013). Fast Exercise: The Smart Route to Health and Fitness. London: Short Books. ISBN 9781780721989. OCLC 862761007.
- Mosley, Michael; Spencer, Mimi (2015). The FastLife: Lose Weight, Stay Healthy, and Live Longer with the Simple Secrets of Intermittent Fasting and High-Intensity Training. New York: Atria Books. ISBN 9781501127984. OCLC 922597339.
- Mosley, Michael (2016). The 8-Week Blood Sugar Diet: How to Beat Diabetes Fast (and Stay Off Medication) (First ed.). New York: Atria Books. ISBN 9781501111242. OCLC 946536100.
- Mosley, Michael (2017). The Clever Gut Diet (First ed.). New York: Atria Books. ISBN 9781501172748. OCLC 1090297589.
- Mosley, Michael (2019). The Fast800 Diet: Discover the Ideal Fasting Formula to Shed Pounds, Fight Disease, and Boost Your Overall Health (First ed.). New York: Atria Books. ISBN 978-1-9821-0689-8. OCLC 1127182027.
- Mosley, Michael (2020). Fast Asleep: Improve Brain Function, Lose Weight, Boost Your Mood, Reduce Stress, and Become a Better Sleeper (First ed.). New York: Atria Books. ISBN 9781982106928. OCLC 1181841827.
- Mosley, Michael (2020). COVID-19: Everything You Need to Know about the Coronavirus and the Race for the Vaccine (First ed.). New York: Atria Books. ISBN 9781982164744. OCLC 1156472581.
- Mosley, Michael (2021). The Fast 800 Keto: Eat Well, Burn Fat, Manage Your Weight Long Term (First ed.). Short Books. ISBN 9781780725024.
- Mosley, Michael (2022). Just One Thing: How simple changes can transform your life (hardback ed.). Short Books. ISBN 9781780725512.
