= University Challenge 2023–24 =

Season of a television programme

The 53rd series of the quiz show University Challenge began on 17 July 2023 on BBC Two, and ended with the final on 8 April 2024, when Imperial College London triumphed for a record-breaking fifth time. This was the first series to be hosted by Amol Rajan, who succeeded Jeremy Paxman. Rajan's presenting style, more energetic and less austere than his predecessor, garnered positive reception from critics and viewers.

== Background ==
In the quiz show, two teams of four compete on the buzzer to answer a "starter" question, earning ten points for a correct answer and losing five points if interrupting with a wrong answer before the question is finished. Three "bonus" questions are given to the winning team, on which they can confer. Question writers are on hand to rule on the correctness of answers. As in the first episode of the 53rd series, a draw leads to a single tie-breaker question on the buzzer. The competition is open to all universities and university colleges in the UK, of which 120 applied and 28 made the televised rounds this series. Teams often bring mascots.

The 53rd series was the first to be presented by the BBC journalist and presenter Amol Rajan, the third host in the programme's 60-year tenure. He succeeded Jeremy Paxman, who was diagnosed with Parkinson's disease, after 29 years as host. The series had a new set and opening sequence, but maintained its theme tune and announcements by Roger Tilling. Rajan adopted a more relaxed and enthusiastic persona than Paxman, praising impressive answers while sometimes mocking poor answers. He maintained a number of traditional phrases, such as "Fingers on buzzers – here's your first starter for 10". Rajan had appeared as a contestant in the Christmas series in 2020 and reported having watched the series for years.

The 53rd series began on 17 July 2023 and aired on BBC Two in the Monday 8:30 p.m. timeslot, following the quiz shows Mastermind and Only Connect. It was produced by Lifted Entertainment, a division of ITV Studios. Episodes were filmed in MediaCityUK, Salford, without a studio audience.

== Results ==
Northeastern University – London debuted in the competition, losing to York.

The final matched up two undefeated teams, from Imperial College London and University College London (UCL). It was also the first all-London final since 1996 which was Imperial's first win, against the London School of Economics.

With this being their fifth win, Imperial became the institution with the highest number of series wins, exceeding the four set by University of Manchester and Magdalen College, Oxford. Tom Stoppard joined for a ceremony in the final to mark the winners.

- Winning teams are highlighted in **bold**.
- Teams with green scores (winners) returned in the next round, while those with red scores (losers) were eliminated (as they were not one of the highest scoring losers).
- Teams with orange scores had to win one more match to return in the next round.
- Teams with yellow scores indicate that two further matches had to be played and won (teams that lost their first quarter-final match).
- A score in italics indicates a match decided on a tie-breaker question.

=== First round ===
Team 1	Score		Team 2	Total	Broadcast date
Trinity College, Cambridge	175	185	**University of Manchester**	360	17 July 2023
**University of Aberdeen**	190	125	University of Birmingham	315	24 July 2023
**Birkbeck, University of London**	220	205	Oxford Brookes University	425	31 July 2023
University of Southampton	155	180	**Christ Church, Oxford**	335	7 August 2023
**Emmanuel College, Cambridge**	240	60	Jesus College, Oxford	300	14 August 2023
King's College, Cambridge	145	190	**University College London**	335	21 August 2023
**University of East Anglia**	235	125	University of Strathclyde	360	28 August 2023
The Open University	155	230	**Hertford College, Oxford**	385	4 September 2023
Balliol College, Oxford	145	285	**Imperial College London**	430	11 September 2023
**University of Sheffield**	290	115	Loughborough University	405	18 September 2023
**University of Warwick**	265	140	Wolfson College, Cambridge	405	25 September 2023
Bangor University	150	320	**University of Edinburgh**	470	2 October 2023
**Lincoln College, Oxford**	225	65	King's College London	290	9 October 2023
**University of York**	190	120	Northeastern University – London	310	16 October 2023

=== Highest scoring losers play-offs ===
Team 1	Score		Team 2	Total	Broadcast date
**Trinity College, Cambridge**	245	120	University of Southampton	365	23 October 2023
Oxford Brookes University	155	255	**The Open University**	410	30 October 2023

=== Second round ===
Team 1	Score		Team 2	Total	Broadcast date
University of Warwick	185	205	**Trinity College, Cambridge**	390	6 November 2023
**The Open University**	265	130	University of East Anglia	395	13 November 2023
Emmanuel College, Cambridge	130	155	**Christ Church, Oxford**	285	20 November 2023
Hertford College, Oxford	140	225	**University College London**	365	27 November 2023
**University of Manchester**	215	105	University of Edinburgh	320	4 December 2023
University of York	155	165	**Birkbeck, University of London**	320	11 December 2023
**University of Sheffield**	130	105	University of Aberdeen	235	1 January 2024
Lincoln College, Oxford	120	250	**Imperial College London**	370	8 January 2024

=== Quarter-finals ===
Team 1	Score		Team 2	Total	Broadcast date
**University of Manchester**	160	95	Birkbeck, University of London	255	15 January 2024
University of Sheffield	160	195	**Imperial College London**	355	22 January 2024
**Trinity College, Cambridge**	190	170	The Open University	360	29 January 2024
**University College London**	200	130	Christ Church, Oxford	330	5 February 2024
University of Manchester	120	205	**Imperial College London**	325	12 February 2024
**Birkbeck, University of London**	200	160	University of Sheffield	360	19 February 2024
Trinity College, Cambridge	150	165	**University College London**	315	26 February 2024
The Open University	75	170	**Christ Church, Oxford**	245	4 March 2024
**University of Manchester**	145	130	Christ Church, Oxford	275	11 March 2024
Birkbeck, University of London	100	165	**Trinity College, Cambridge**	265	18 March 2024

=== Semi-finals ===
Team 1	Score		Team 2	Total	Broadcast date
**Imperial College London**	240	110	Trinity College, Cambridge	350	25 March 2024
**University College London**	210	165	University of Manchester	375	1 April 2024

=== Final ===
Team 1	Score		Team 2	Total	Broadcast date
**Imperial College London**	285	120	University College London	405	8 April 2024

- The winning Imperial team consisted of Justin Lee, Adam Jones, Suraiya Haddad, and Sourajit Debnath, who beat the UCL team of James Hall, Ali Izzatdust, Tayana Sawh, and Jacob Finlay.
- The trophy was presented in the studio by Amol Rajan, with Sir Tom Stoppard featuring in a separate ceremony filmed on location at Imperial College London to commemorate the university's fifth series win.
- This was the first regular series to be hosted by Amol Rajan since taking over from Jeremy Paxman.

== Spin-off: Christmas Special 2023 ==
Since 2011, a spin-off Christmas series is aired, featuring distinguished alumni. It began on 18 December 2023, in the 8:30 p.m. timeslot on BBC Two. The competition featured only one team from Oxford or Cambridge, fewer than previous Christmas series.

=== First round ===
Out of seven first-round winners, only the top four highest-scoring teams progress to the semi-finals.

One first-round episode, filmed in November, was not aired due to complaints from two contestants over accessibility requirements. The BBC said the rest of the series was not affected by the withdrawal of the episode, which involved an Oxford and Cambridge team. One neurodivergent contestant reported being denied subtitles and only partially receiving accommodations for sensory needs. Another said they were told on the day that previously agreed on audio description would not be provided. The BBC apologised to the participants. The UK National Federation of the Blind encouraged the series to be withdrawn and re-recorded.

- Winning teams are highlighted in **bold**.
- Teams with green scores (winners) returned in the next round, while those with red scores (losers) were eliminated.
- Teams with grey scores won their match but did not achieve a high enough score to proceed to the next round.
- A score in italics indicates a match decided on a tie-breaker question.

Team 1	Score		Team 2	Total	Broadcast date
**King's College London**	155	120	City, University of London	275	18 December 2023
**Royal Holloway, University of London**	170	95	University of East Anglia	265	19 December 2023
University of Dundee	75	185	**Bangor University**	260	20 December 2023
**Corpus Christi College, Oxford**	265	80	University of Edinburgh	345	21 December 2023
**Imperial College London**	110	80	University of Liverpool	190	22 December 2023
**Middlesex University**	175	115	University of Leeds	290	26 December 2023

==== Standings for the winners ====
Rank	Team	Team captain(s)	Score
1	Corpus Christi College, Oxford	Alex Bellos	265
2	Bangor University	David Neal	185
3	Middlesex University	Dan Renton Skinner / Heather Phillipson (Note: Dan Renton Skinner was the original team captain, but was unable to make the recordings of the semi-finals and final, so Heather Phillipson took over as captain, and David Heathcote took his place as a team member.)	175
4	Royal Holloway, University of London	Liz Sayce	170
5	King's College London	Ayshah Tull	155
6	Imperial College London	Anjana Ahuja	110

=== Semi-finals ===
Team 1	Score		Team 2	Total	Broadcast date
Royal Holloway, University of London	160	180	**Corpus Christi College, Oxford**	340	27 December 2023
Bangor University	85	195	**Middlesex University**	280	28 December 2023

=== Final ===
Team 1	Score		Team 2	Total	Broadcast date
Corpus Christi College, Oxford	80	175	**Middlesex University**	255	29 December 2023

The winning Middlesex University team consisted of David Heathcote, David Hepworth, Heather Phillipson, Dan Renton Skinner and Lola Young, who beat Corpus Christi College, Oxford and their team of Francesca Happé, Michael Cockerell, Alex Bellos and Steve Waters.

== Reception ==
Rajan's first episode outperformed the BBC One programme in the same timeslot, with 1.9 million viewers. In a five-star review, Sean O'Grady of The Independent praised that Rajan appeared to enjoy presenting and to be knowledgeable but not arrogant. O'Grady found the questions difficult and wide-ranging. Carol Midgley rated it four stars for The Times, remarking on Rajan's "less daunting" personality and the quiz's toughness; in another four-star review, Anita Singh of The Daily Telegraph praised that Rajan had a "brasher presence" but "didn't over-egg it". The Herald's Alison Rowat gave it three stars, describing it as a "fine debut". Mark Lawson of The Guardian also gave it three stars, saying that Rajan "has shown how seriously he takes the role by significantly adapting his presenting style to this new challenge". In contrast, James Delingpole of The Spectator criticised the subject matter of questions, including climate change, supranational unions and "gender and diversity" artists.

After the first episode, viewers criticised that Rajan was positioned low down relative to his desk. Rajan said this would be changed for the following series. Melanie McDonagh of The Spectator praised Rajan's outfit but believed the slate screen from which he read prompts was inferior to question cards, reducing eye contact with contestants. By the end of the series, according to i's Nick Hilton, Rajan had become popular among fans and successfully established a new style for the programme.

In January 2024, Rajan rejected an answer about dance music genres with the words: "I can't accept drum'n'bass – we need jungle, I'm afraid". The clip went viral and was remixed by numerous social media users. Rajan was offered festival sets by DJs after the event. Joe Muggs of The Quietus argued that drum'n'bass should have been accepted as correct.

Misinformation on social media alleged that one team's octopus mascot and one contestant's coloured jacket were antisemitic or pro-Palestinian references to the Gaza war that began in October 2023. The episode in question was filmed in March 2023. The politician Jacqueline Foster paid damages and issued an apology to one contestant after asking for them to be expelled and arrested after their appearance. However, a complaint to the House of Lords commissioner was not upheld.
