= Born from the Same Stranger =

- Country of origin: United Kingdom
- Original language: English

Production
- Running time: 1 hour (including adverts)

Original release
- Network: ITV1
- Release: 22 January 2024 – present

Born from the Same Stranger is an ITV1 television series about people born from sperm and egg donors finding out who their biological parents are, as well as donors searching for their biological children. The show was released in 2024.

== See also ==
- Donor conceived people
