= The Genius of Invention =

- Genre: Factual
- Directed by: Victoria Bell
- Presented by: Michael Mosley; Mark Miodownik; Cassie Newland
- Country of origin: United Kingdom
- Original language: English
- No. of series: 1
- No. of episodes: 4 (list of episodes)

Production
- Executive producer: Dominic Crossley-Holland
- Producers: Michael Tuft; Victoria Bell
- Running time: 60 minutes
- Production company: BBC Productions

Original release
- Network: BBC Two; BBC HD
- Release: 24 January – 14 February 2013

The Genius of Invention is a British factual television series that was broadcast on BBC Two between 24 January 2013 and 14 February 2013. The series looks over the history of British inventions.

== Production ==
On 23 August 2013, BBC Two controller Janice Hadlow announced the commissioning of the series. The main presenters of the series were Mark Miodownik, Cassie Newland and Michael Mosley.

== Episode list ==
No.	Title	Original release date	UK viewers (millions)
1	"Power"	24 January 2013	1.60
How Britain uses power through technology.
2	"Speed"	31 January 2013	N/A
How the steam locomotive, internal combustion engine and jet engine were invented.
3	"Communication"	7 February 2013	N/A
The formation of machines that allow communication across the globe.
4	"Visual Image"	14 February 2013	N/A
The inventors who discovered how to reproduce still and moving images.

== Reception ==
Terry Ramsey of The Daily Telegraph gave the series three out of five stars and said that "despite the jumpy style and occasionally annoying chat, it had a lot of appealing science packed in, all neatly wrapped up so it didn’t even feel like we were learning. And it served as a useful reminder of just how much we rely on electricity." The Independent's Tom Sutcliffe said "everything from presentational style to the level of the material it contains it's essentially a children's programme. In fact, it calls for a new verb: to Bluepeterise, a shorthand for the increasingly fashionable technique of dividing the content up between three puppyishly eager presenters". Lucy Mangan, writing for The Guardian called it "terrible".

== DVD release ==
The series was released in the original English as a region 2 DVD set by a Dutch company in 2015.
