= The Story of Science: Power, Proof and Passion =

- Genre: Science documentary
- Presented by: Michael Mosley
- Country of origin: United Kingdom
- Original language: English
- No. of series: 1
- No. of episodes: 6

Production
- Running time: 1 hour

Original release
- Network: BBC Two
- Release: 27 April – 1 June 2010

The Story of Science: Power, Proof and Passion is a 2010 BBC documentary on the history of science presented by Michael Mosley.

== Episodes ==
Episode No.	Title	Broadcast Date
1	What Is Out There?	27 April 2010
2	What is the World Made of?	4 May 2010
3	How Did We Get Here?	11 May 2010
4	Can We Have Unlimited Power?	18 May 2010
5	What Is the Secret of Life?	25 May 2010
6	Who Are We?	1 June 2010
