= Wild Scandinavia =

2023 nature documentary series

- Genre: Nature documentary
- Narrated by: Rebecca Ferguson
- Composer: Biggi Hilmars
- Original language: English
- No. of episodes: 3

Production
- Production location: Scandinavia
- Production company: BBC Natural History Unit

Original release
- Network: PBS; BBC Two
- Release: 2023 – 2023

Wild Scandinavia is a 2023 three-part natural history television series, exploring the nature and culture of Scandinavia. The series is narrated by Swedish actress Rebecca Ferguson.

The series was made by the BBC Studios Natural History Unit, and co-produced by PBS. It premiered on PBS and BBC Two.

== Plot ==
Covering diverse Nordic landscapes—southern Denmark's sandy plains, Iceland's volcanoes, Sweden's forests, and prominently Norway's fjords—the series also features extreme human activities such as fjord cliff BASE jumping. The first episode, Life on the Edge, explores how animals interact on Scandinavia's coast. It shows the lives of animals such as polar bears, orca, puffins, reindeer and musk ox.

A separate German documentary on similar topics, Wildes Skandinavien, was broadcast in 2010-2011, the two series are unrelated.

== Episodes ==
- Life on the Edge
- Heartlands
- Ice and Fire

== Reception ==
The series had a positive critical reception. John Anderson of The Wall Street Journal praised the series' "startlingly beautiful and intimate imagery", which he considered to be part of "a quiet revolution under way in nature cinematography."
