= Depher =

Plumbing company in Burnley, UK

- Predecessor: Northern Plumbing and Heating Ltd (4 March 2017–6 August 2019)
- Formation: March 2017
- Founder: James Ward Anderson
- Dissolved: 14 October 2025
- Type: Community interest company
- Registration no.: Company 11335052
- Headquarters: 24 Keirby Walk
- Location: Burnley, Lancashire, United Kingdom
- Coordinates: 53.7897°N 2.2396°W
- Products: Plumbing services
- Director: James Ward Anderson
- Revenue: £1,257,361 (2022/2023)
- Expenses: £709,855 (2022/2023)
- Staff: 13 (2022/2023)
- Formerly called: 2018–2024: Depher CIC; 2024: Community Plumbing and Heating Support CIC; 2024–2025: Depher Community Plumbing and Heating CIC
- Source: Companies House

Depher (Disabled and Elderly Plumbing and Heating Emergency Repair) was a community interest company based in Burnley, Lancashire, England, that provided free plumbing and heating services to vulnerable people. It relied on crowdfunding and donations. The company was founded in March 2017. It was dissolved in October 2025, following a series of investigations by the BBC and the Fundraising Regulator.

== History ==
Depher was founded in March 2017 by James Ward Anderson. Anderson was inspired to help people after he visited an elderly man whose boiler had been tampered with in an attempt to make him pay for a replacement.

The company relied on crowdfunding, donations, and income from private jobs to fund its work.

During the COVID-19 pandemic, Depher gave vulnerable people free food, gas, and electricity. This stopped in 2023 due to Depher being unable to support an increase in demand.

In June 2023, Anderson received a British Citizen Award at the Palace of Westminster for services to volunteering and charitable giving. The award was later rescinded.

In November 2023 Depher began taking donations of furniture, clothing, and shoes for its fundraising shop in Burnley.

Depher rebranded to "Community Plumbing and Heating Support" in January 2024. Then rebranding in February 2024 to Depher Community Plumbing and Heating Support CIC. Anderson stood down as director in July 2024. The company was dissolved on 14 October 2025.

== Donations ==
In August 2023, Samantha Giles donated two photos from the set of Emmerdale to raise funds for Depher.

In October 2023, Depher returned a donation from Tristan Tate following a social media backlash due to ongoing criminal investigations.

Hugh Grant and Anna Eberstein have donated a total of £75k to Depher.

In April 2024, Depher suspended all fundraising via platforms such as GoFundMe and Crowdfunder.

== BBC investigation and accusations of impropriety ==
On 16 May 2024, the BBC published an article detailing an investigation into Depher and Anderson. This investigation reported instances of manipulation in social media posts, lack of consent from those being featured, and safety concerns regarding Depher's operations from former employees. A 31-minute report, titled Scams & Scandals: Britain's Hero Plumber Exposed, was subsequently uploaded to BBC iPlayer.

=== Use of social media ===
Anderson has attracted considerable attention and controversy via his use of both personal and Depher social media accounts, including posting photos of customers without permission, and cases where photos and stories shared have been subsequently found to have been faked or altered.

=== 2022 house purchase ===
In February 2024, Anderson revealed he purchased a house to rent out to his brother-in-law and father-in-law at a cost of £73,125. However, Anderson maintains that the house was purchased via "profits from paid work".

=== Investigations by regulatory bodies ===
In March 2024, Anderson uploaded a video to a new Depher CPH CIC Fundraising Facebook page detailing work ongoing with the CIC Regulator and the Information Commissioner's Office (ICO) regarding safeguarding processes.

In May 2024, an article published by Lancashire Live confirmed ongoing investigations into Depher by the Fundraising Regulator, the CIC Regulator and the ICO as a result of accusations of wrongdoing. These accusations include "fixing" of a tombola in the Fundraising Shop, GDPR and personal data breaches of Depher clients, as well as concerns surrounding Depher's finances.

In September 2025 it was confirmed to have breached multiple fundraising rules.
