= 2024 deaths in the United Kingdom =

The following notable deaths of British people occurred in 2024. Names are reported under the date of death, in alphabetical order. A typical entry reports information in the following sequence:

- Name, age, citizenship at birth, nationality (in addition to British), or/and home nation, what subject was noted for, birth year, cause of death (if known), and reference.

== January ==
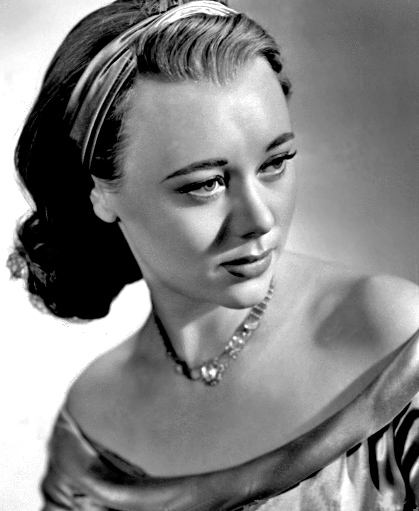
Glynis Johns in 1953

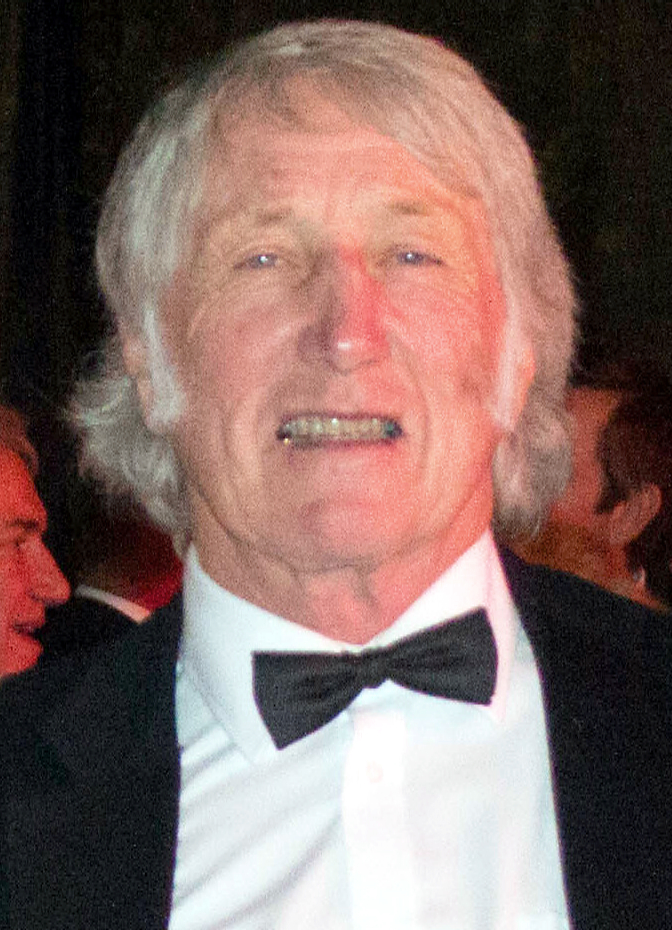
J. P. R. Williams in 2014

- 1 January – Graham Tripp, 91, English cricketer (Somerset).
- 2 January
  - Matisyahu Salomon, 86, English-born American rabbi.
  - Sir Frank Kitson, 97, military officer, Commander-in-Chief, Land Forces (1982–1985) and deputy commander field army (1980–1982).
- 3 January
  - Derek Draper, 56, lobbyist and political adviser.
  - Bobby Hoy, 73, English footballer (Huddersfield Town, Halifax Town, Blackburn Rovers). (death announced on this date)
- 4 January
  - Georgina Hale, 80, English actress (Mahler, The Devils, Castaway).
  - Glynis Johns, 100, South African-born British actress (The Sundowners, Mary Poppins, A Little Night Music).
  - Keith Lamb, 77, English football executive, chief executive of Middlesbrough (1987–2011).
  - Leah Owen, 70, Welsh singer.
  - Mike Sadler, 103, British Army officer, last original member of the Special Air Service.
  - David Soul, 80, American-born actor (Starsky & Hutch, Here Come the Brides) and singer ("Don't Give Up on Us").
- 5 January
  - Philip Hedley, 85, British theatre director. (death announced on this date)
  - Del Palmer, 71, English singer-songwriter, bass guitarist, and sound engineer.
- 6 January – Sir Roy Calne, 93, British surgeon.
- 7 January – Tony Clarkin, 77, English guitarist and songwriter (Magnum).
- 8 January – J. P. R. Williams, 74, Welsh rugby union player (Barbarians, British & Irish Lions, national team). (death announced on this date)
- 10 January – Peter Johnson, 84, English food industry and football executive, chairman of Tranmere Rovers (1987–1998, 2000–2014) and Everton (1994–1999).
- 11 January – Annie Nightingale, 83, broadcaster (BBC Radio 1) and television presenter (The Old Grey Whistle Test).
- 13 January – Mel Blyth, 79, English footballer (Crystal Palace, Southampton, Millwall). (death announced on this date)
- 14 January – Malcolm Alker, 45, English rugby league player (Salford Red Devils, national team). (death announced on this date)
- 15 January
  - Charmian Abrahams, 96, British actress (Crossroads).
  - Denis Connaghan, 79, Scottish footballer (Celtic, St Mirren, Morton). (death announced on this date)
- 16 January – Laurie Johnson, 96, English composer and bandleader.
- 17 January – Sir Tony Lloyd, 73, British politician, MP (1983–2012, since 2017) and mayor of Greater Manchester (2015–2017), leukemia.
- 18 January
  - Ray Henderson, 86, English footballer (Hull City, Reading). (death announced on this date)
  - John Hurst, 76, English footballer (Everton, Oldham Athletic).
  - Mick Ives, 84, English racing cyclist.
  - Alan Mills, 88, English tennis player and official, referee for Wimbledon Championships (1983–2005).
  - Ivan Moody, 59, British composer and musicologist.
  - Simon Peel, 54, British broadcaster (Gaydio)
- 19 January – Graham Bright, 81, British politician, MP (1979–1997) and Cambridgeshire police and crime commissioner (2012–2016).
- 20 January – Doug Padgett, 89, English cricketer (Yorkshire, national team).
- 22 January
  - Tommy Baldwin, 78, English footballer (Chelsea, Arsenal, Seattle Sounders).
  - Jack Jennings, 104, British World War II veteran, last survivor of the Burma Death Railway. (death announced on this date)
- 23 January – Martin Middlebrook, 91, English military historian and writer. (death announced on this date)
- 24 January – Wayne Brown, British chief fire officer (West Midlands Fire Service) (death announced on this date)
- 26 January
  - Keith Booth, 81, English cricket writer. (death announced on this date)
  - Graham Drury, 71, Welsh motorcycle speedway rider.
  - Walter Love, 88, Northern Irish broadcaster (BBC Radio Ulster).
- 27 January
  - Peter Glynn, 71, English rugby league player (St. Helens, Salford, national team). (death announced on this date)
  - Stuart Gray, 50, Scottish footballer (Celtic, Reading, Rushden & Diamonds), cancer. (death announced on this date)
  - Malcolm Gregson, 80, English golfer. (death announced on this date)
- 28 January – Lenny Piper, 46, English footballer (Gillingham, St Albans City, Farnborough).
- 29 January – David Smith, 88, English Anglican clergyman, bishop of Bradford (1992–2002). (death announced on this date)
- 30 January
  - Brian Griffin, 75, British photographer.
  - Richard Howard, 79, British actor (Emmerdale Farm). (death announced on this date)
  - Ally Shewan, 83, Scottish football player (Aberdeen) and manager (Elgin City). (death announced on this date)
  - Abe Terry, 89, English rugby league player (St Helens).

== February ==
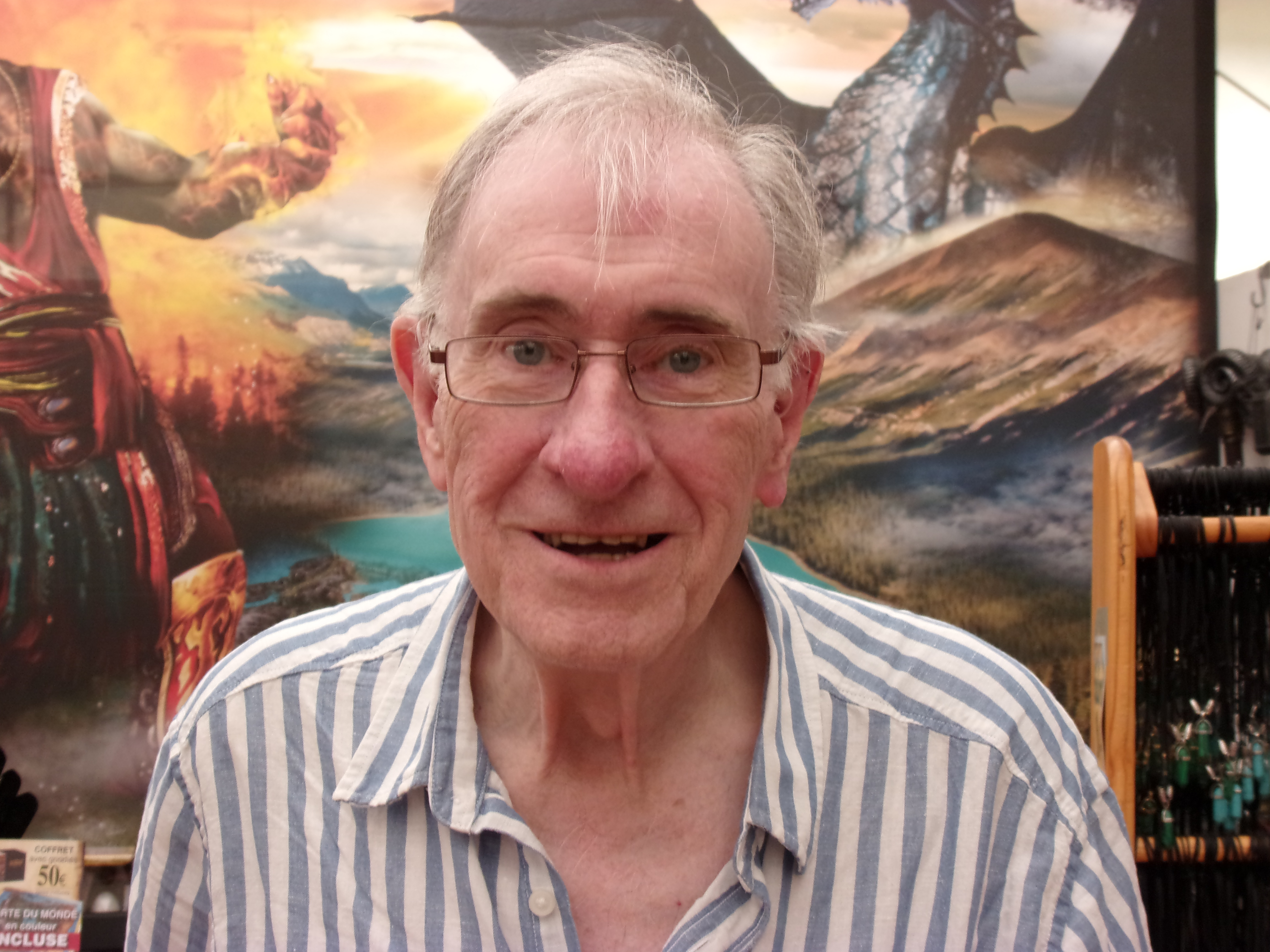
Christopher Priest in 2019

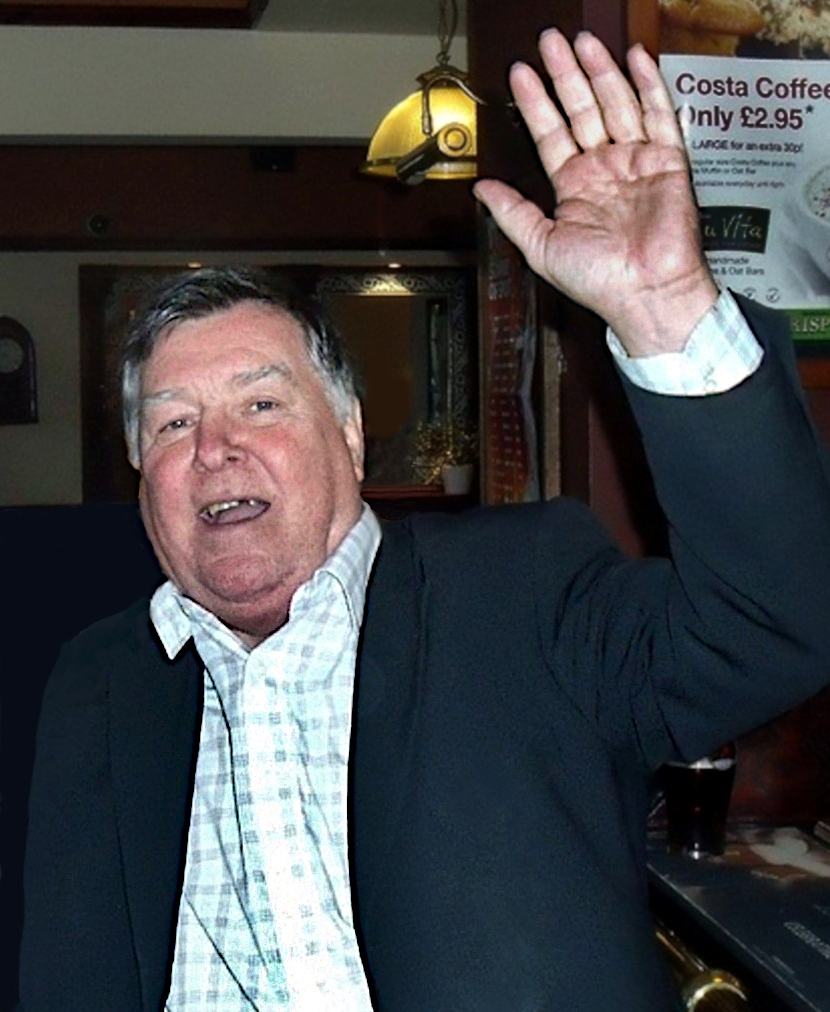
Barry John in 2011

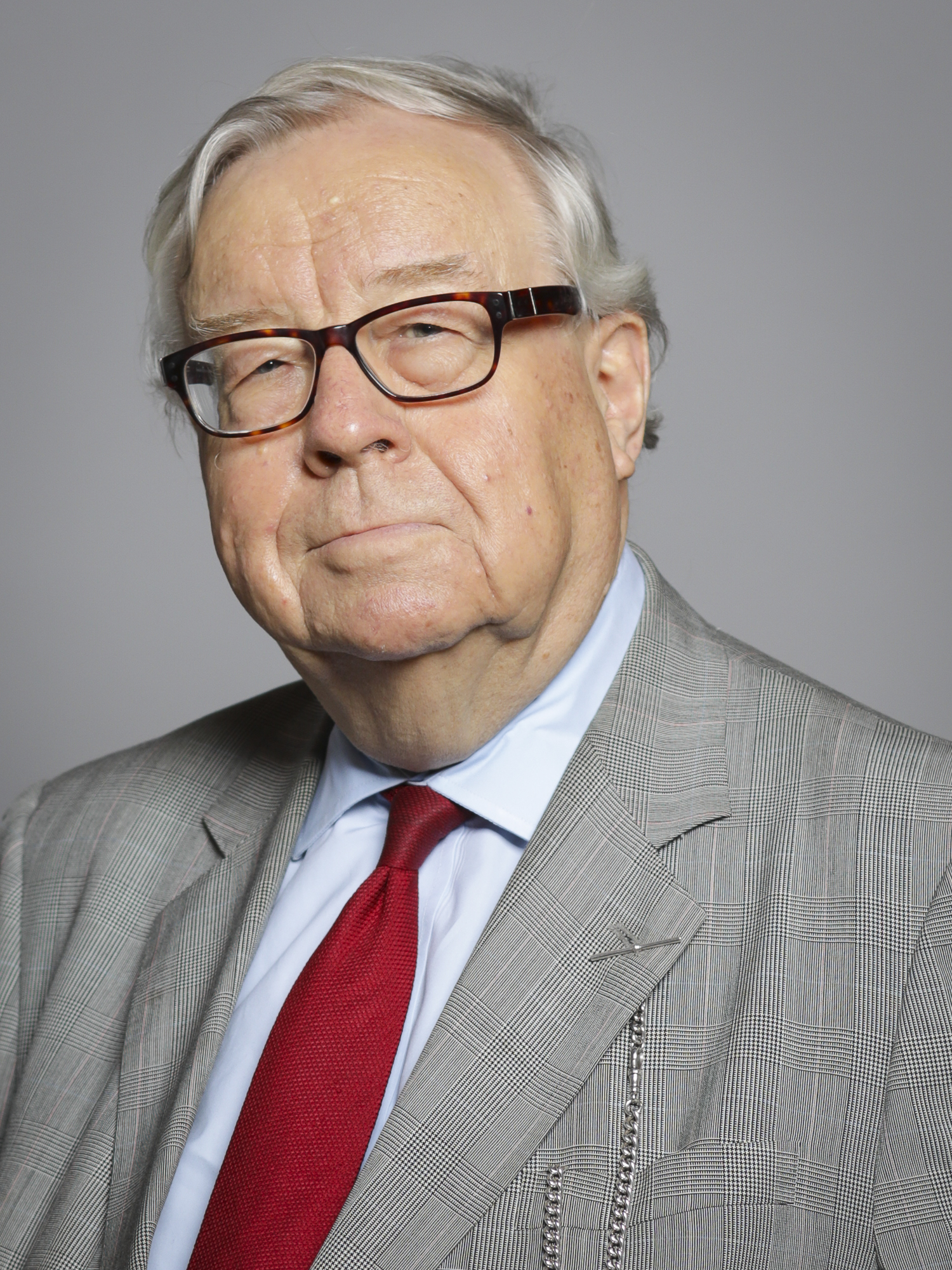
Patrick Cormack in 2019

- 1 February – Patrick Hanks, 83, English lexicographer and linguist.
- 2 February
  - Steve Brown, 66, British composer, lyricist and record producer, pulmonary fibrosis.
  - Jonnie Irwin, 50, English television presenter (A Place in the Sun, Escape to the Country, To Buy or Not to Buy), lung cancer. (death announced on this date)
  - Ian Lavender, 77, English actor (Dad's Army, EastEnders, Parsley Sidings).
  - Derrick McIntyre, 66, English bassist (Jamiroquai), worked with (Emeli Sande), (Will Young), (Beverley Knight).
  - Christopher Priest, 80, English novelist (Fugue for a Darkening Island, The Affirmation, The Prestige).
- 4 February
  - Barry John, 79, Welsh rugby player (Cardiff, Barbarian, national team).
  - Keagan Kirkby, 25, English jockey.
  - Mallorca Lee, 51, Scottish DJ, producer, (Ultra-Sonic), (Public Domain).
  - Papineau, 23, British Thoroughbred racehorse.
- 5 February – Michael Jayston, 88, English actor (Jane Eyre, Tinker Tailor Soldier Spy, Only Fools and Horses).
- 6 February
  - Sir Anthony Epstein, 102, British pathologist (Epstein-Barr virus).
  - Shreela Flather, 89, British-Indian politician, Life peer (since 1990).
- 9 February – Peter Handyside, 49, Scottish footballer (Grimsby Town, Stoke City, Barnsley).
- 10 February – Ian Lawson, 84, English footballer (Leeds United, Burnley, Crystal Palace). (death announced on this date)
- 12 February
  - Alec Mills, 91, British camera operator and cinematographer (King Kong Lives, The Living Daylights, Christopher Columbus: The Discovery).
  - Steve Wright, 69, English disc jockey and radio personality (Steve Wright in the Afternoon), ruptured ulcer.
- 15 February
  - Ian Amey, 79, English musician and singer (Dave Dee, Dozy, Beaky, Mick & Tich).
  - Georgine Anderson, 96, British actress (Persuasion, The Woman in White, Coronation Street.
  - Peter Armitage, 99, English medical statistician.
  - Stuart Organ, 72, British actor (Grange Hill, Doctor Who, Brookside).
- 16 February
  - Ian McMillan, 92, Scottish footballer (Airdrieonians, Rangers, national team). (death announced on this date)
  - Bryan Thomas, 95, English architect. (death announced on this date)
- 17 February
  - Bill Francis, 76, British rugby league player (Wigan, St Helens, Great Britain).
  - Eddie Mitchell, 69, English football club owner (AFC Bournemouth).
  - Alan Wilson, 68, British Anglican prelate, bishop of Buckingham (since 2003).
- 19 February – Ewen MacIntosh, 50, British actor and comedian (The Office, Little Britain, Miranda).
- 20 February – Robin Windsor, 44, British professional dancer (Strictly Come Dancing). (death announced on this date)
- 21 February
  - Pamela Salem, 80, British actress (Into the Labyrinth, EastEnders, Never Say Never Again).
  - John Savident, 86, British actor (Coronation Street, A Clockwork Orange, The Remains of the Day).
  - Charlie Strutton, 34, English footballer (Chalfont St Peter, AFC Wimbledon, Slough Town).
- 22 February
  - Paul Bradshaw, 67, English footballer (Blackburn Rovers, Wolverhampton Wanderers, Peterborough United). (death announced on this date)
  - John Lowe, 81, English pianist (The Quarrymen).
- 23 February
  - Ronnie Campbell, 80, British politician, MP (1987–2019).
  - Chris Gauthier, 48, English-born Canadian actor (Once Upon a Time, Eureka, Freddy vs. Jason).
  - Harry Melrose, 88, Scottish football player (Dunfermline Athletic, Aberdeen, Berwick Rangers) and manager. (death announced on this date)
- 24 February
  - Stan Bowles, 75, English footballer (Queens Park Rangers, Brentford, national team), complications from Alzheimer's disease.
  - Stewart Robertson, 75, Scottish conductor. (death announced on this date)
  - Brian Stableford, 75, British science fiction writer (Balance of Power).
- 25 February
  - Patrick Cormack, 84, British politician, MP (1970–2010) and member of the House of Lords (since 2010).
  - Thomas Kingston, 45, member of British Royal Family, son in law to Prince Michael of Kent. (death announced on 27 February)
  - Bernard Kops, 97, British poet and dramatist.
  - Chris Nicholl, 77, English-born Northern Irish football player (Aston Villa, Southampton, Northern Ireland national team) and manager.
- 26 February – Jacob Rothschild, 4th Baron Rothschild, 87, British investment banker and peer, member of the House of Lords (1991–1999).
- 27 February
  - Michael Culver, 85, English actor (The Empire Strikes Back, A Passage to India, The Adventures of Black Beauty).
  - John W. Hayes, 85, British archaeologist.
- 28 February – Dave Myers, 66, English television presenter (The Hairy Bikers' Cookbook).
- 29 February
  - John Etty, 97, English rugby league player (Batley Bulldogs, Oldham, Wakefield Trinity).
  - Ruth Henig, Baroness Henig, 80, historian and politician, member of the House of Lords (since 2004), Deputy Speaker of the House of Lords (since 2018).
  - Tiffany Scott, 32, sex offender and transgender prisoner.

== March ==
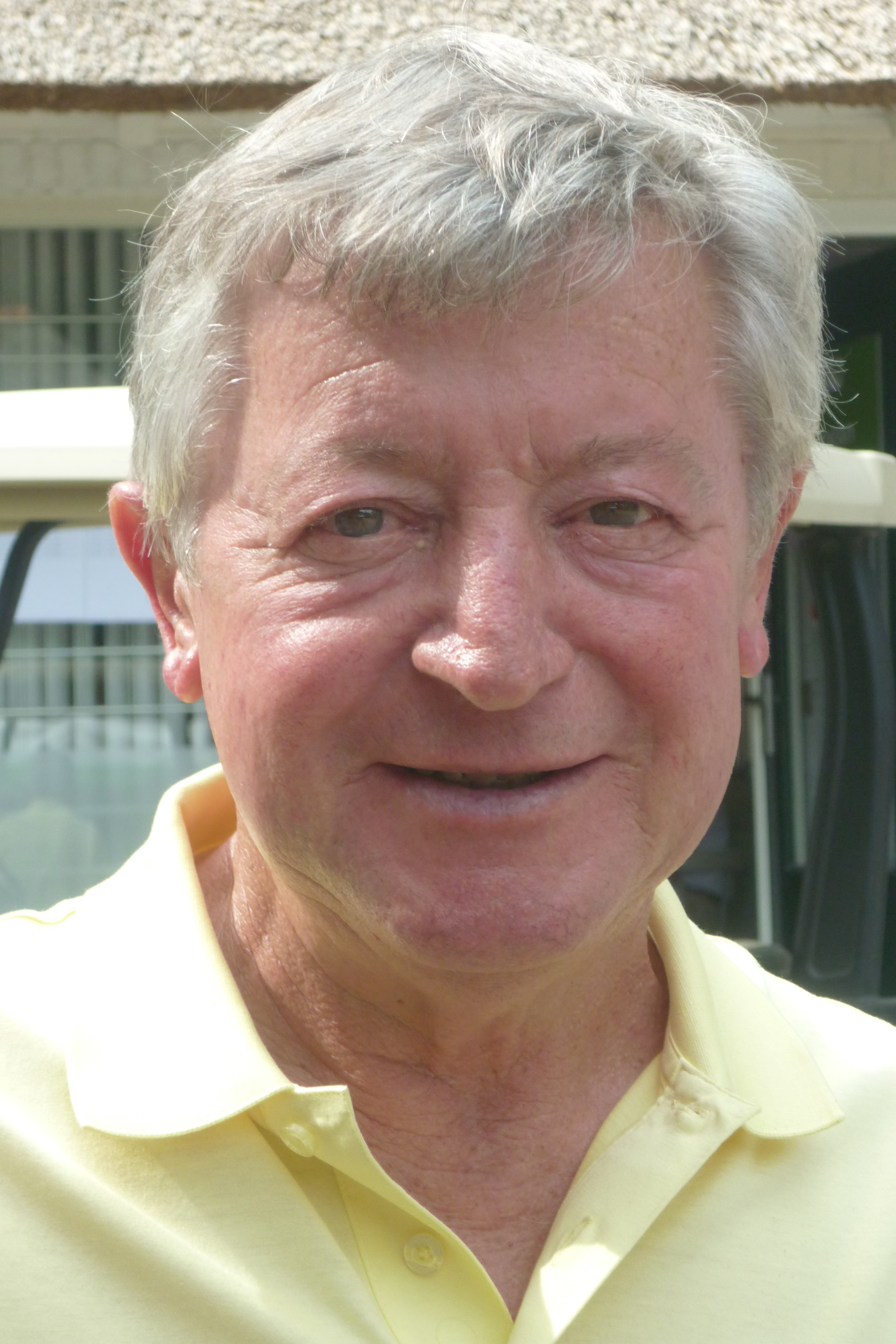
Maurice Bembridge in 2010

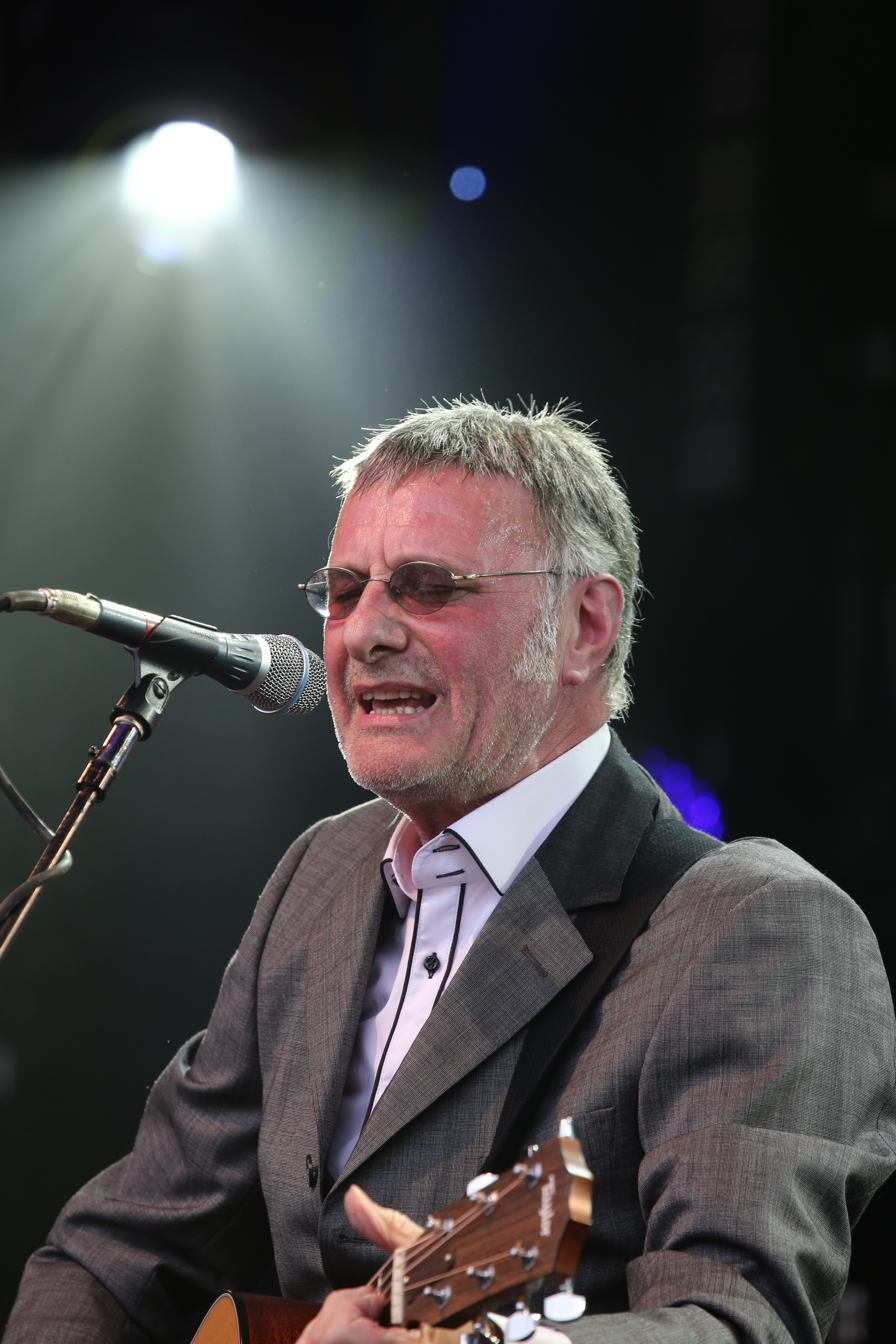
Steve Harley in 2014

- 3 March
  - Edward Bond, 89, British dramatist (Saved, Narrow Road to the Deep North, The Sea) and theatre director.
  - Dan McCartan, 84, Northern Irish Gaelic footballer, selector and manager.
- 4 March
  - Maurice Bembridge, 79, English golfer. (death announced on this date)
  - Tony Green, 85, British sports commentator and television announcer (Bullseye).
  - Lewis Jones, 92, rugby union (Llanelli, national team) and rugby league (Leeds, Great Britain) player. (death announced on this date)
- 5 March – Richard Stone, 86, British anti-racism activist and medical doctor.
- 6 March – Vikki Richards, 79, British actress (Curse of the Crimson Altar, Zeta One, Black Snake).
- 8 March
  - Duncan Fearnley, 83, English cricketer (Worcestershire). (death announced on this date)
  - Tommy McAvoy, Baron McAvoy, 80, British politician, MP (1987–2010) and member of the House of Lords (since 2010). (death announced on this date)
  - Andrew Turner, British broadcaster (BBC Radio 1, Atlantic 252, Capital Radio)
- 9 March – Jimmy Husband, 76, English footballer (Everton, Luton Town, Memphis Rogues).
- 10 March – Karl Wallinger, 66, Welsh musician (The Waterboys, World Party) and songwriter ("Ship of Fools").
- 12 March – James Whitbourn, 60, British composer and conductor.
- 13 March
  - Dick Allix, 78, British drummer (Vanity Fare) and darts official.
  - John Blunt, British drummer (The Searchers). (death announced on this date)
  - Steve Smith, 77, English football player (Huddersfield Town, Halifax Town) and manager.
  - Gerry Summers, 90, English football player (West Bromwich Albion, Sheffield United, Hull City), coach and manager.
- 14 March – Angela McCluskey, 64, Scottish singer (Wild Colonials) and songwriter ("Breathe").
- 15 March – Peter Kelly, 82, Scottish actor (The Tall Guy, Welcome to Sarajevo).
- 16 March – David Seidler, 86, British-American screenwriter (Tucker: The Man and His Dream, The King and I, The King's Speech).
- 17 March
  - Steve Harley, 73, English rock singer-songwriter (Steve Harley & Cockney Rebel).
  - Robin Hobbs, 81, English cricketer (Essex, Glamorgan, national team).
- 18 March
  - Ron Baynham, 94, English footballer (Worcester City, Luton Town, national team).
  - Rose Dugdale, 82, English paramilitary leader (Provisional IRA).
  - Peter Glover, 78, English rugby union player (Bath, Harrogate, national team). (death announced on this date)
  - Peter McAleese, 81, Scottish soldier and mercenary.
  - Pearse McAuley, 59, Northern Irish paramilitary (Provisional IRA) and convicted criminal. (body discovered on this date)
- 20 March
  - Billy Kellock, 70, Scottish footballer (Cardiff City, Peterborough United, Wolverhampton Wanderers).
  - Phil Lowe, 74, English rugby league player (Hull Kingston Rovers, Manly Sea Eagles, national team) and coach (York Wasps). (death announced on this date)
- 22 March – Peter Bennett, 77, English footballer (Leyton Orient, West Ham United).
- 23 March – Richard Taylor, 75, Nigerian civil servant and campaigner.
- 24 March
  - David Capper, 91, Northern Irish journalist and television reporter (BBC Ireland correspondent). (death reported on this date)
  - Samantha Davis, 53, actress and campaigner (founder of Little People UK).
- 26 March – Kay Benbow, 63, British television executive (CBeebies). (death announced on this date)
- 27 March
  - George Gilbey, 40, English television personality (Gogglebox) and reality show contestant (Celebrity Big Brother).
  - David Jackson, 87, English footballer (Bradford City, Tranmere Rovers, Halifax Town). (death announced on this date)
- 28 March
  - Ross J. Anderson, 67, British computer security researcher and author.
  - Larry Lloyd, 75, English football player (Liverpool, national team) and manager (Wigan Athletic).
- 29 March
  - Gerry Conway, 76, English drummer and percussionist (Jethro Tull, Fairport Convention, Cat Stevens).
  - Iain McChesney, 79, Scottish footballer (Queen of the South).
- 30 March – Chance Perdomo, 27, British actor (Midsomer Murders, Chilling Adventures of Sabrina, Gen V).
- 31 March
  - Martin Bax, 90, British consultant paediatrician and publisher, founder of Ambit. (death announced on this date)
  - Paul Bence, 75, English football player (Brentford, Reading) and manager (Wycombe Wanderers). (death announced on this date)

== April ==
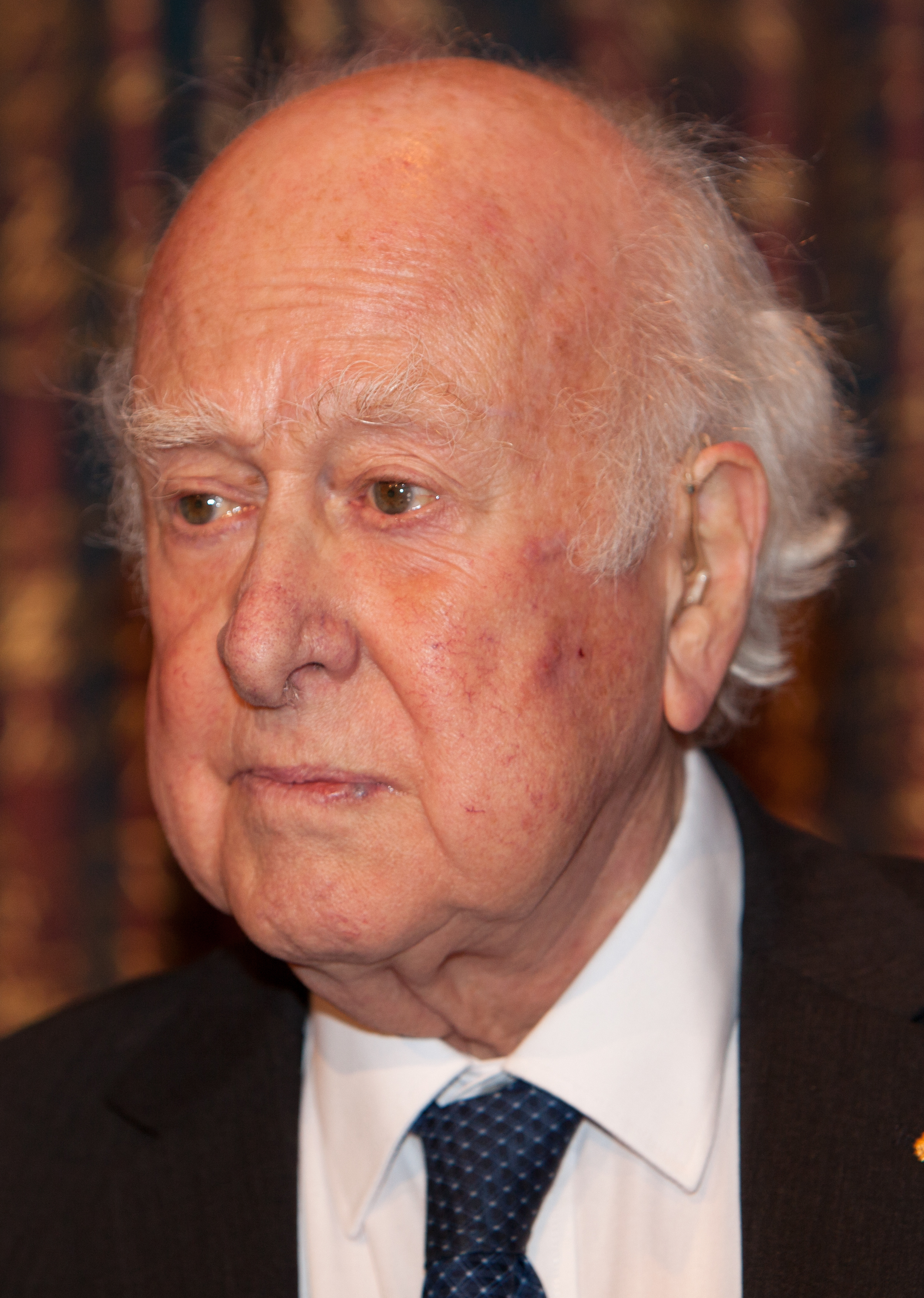
Peter Higgs in 2013

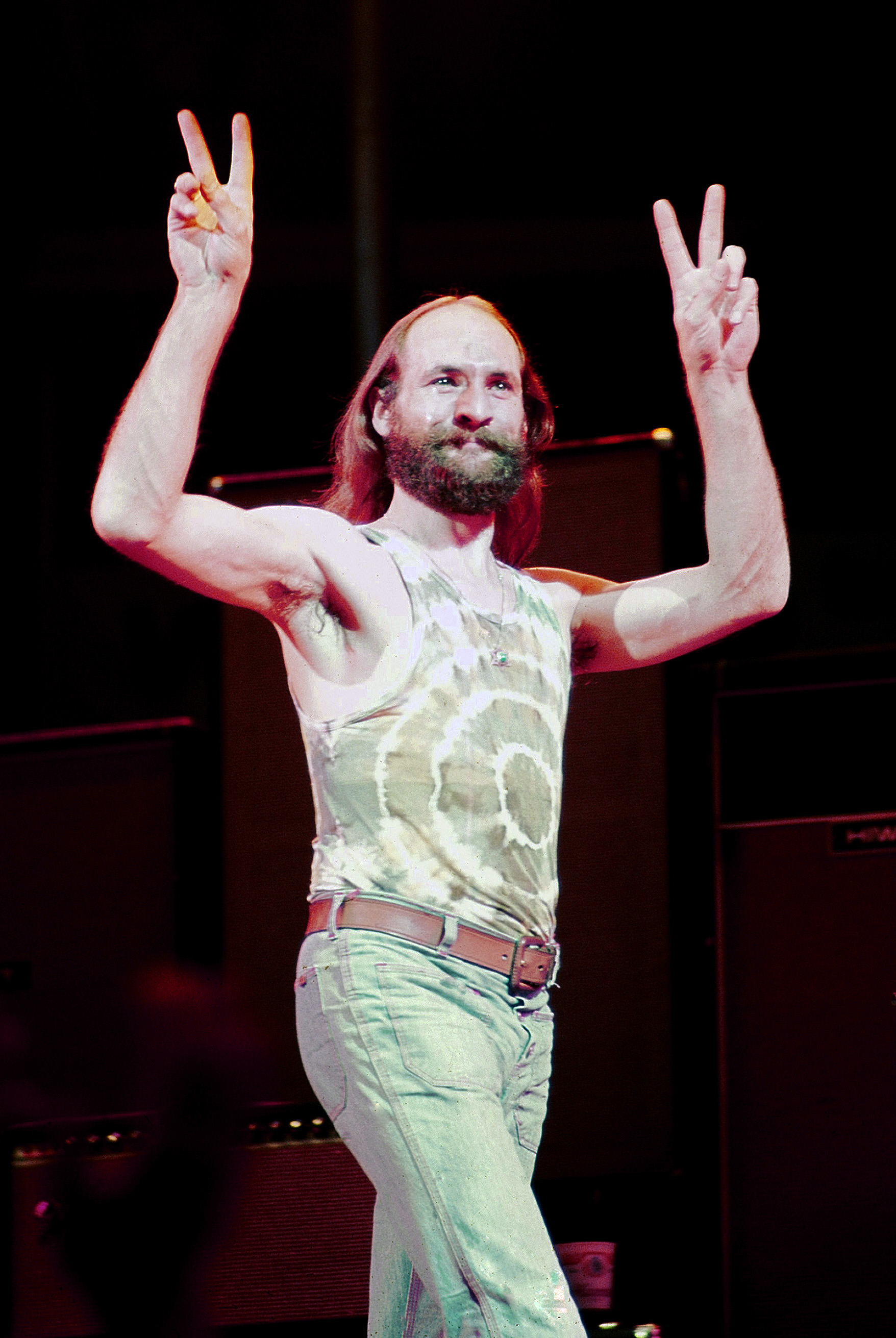
Mike Pinder in 1974

- 3 April – Adrian Schiller, 60, English actor (Victoria, The Last Kingdom, The Danish Girl).
- 4 April
  - Lynne Reid Banks, 94, British author (The Indian in the Cupboard, The L-Shaped Room).
  - Hella Pick, 94, Austrian-born British journalist (The Guardian, New Statesman).
- 5 April – John Louis, 83, English motorcycle speedway rider. (death announced on this date)
- 6 April
  - Doug Hoyle, 98, British politician, MP (1974–1979, 1981–1983) and member of the House of Lords (1997–2023).
  - Dickie Rooks, 83, English football player (Middlesbrough, Bristol City, Sunderland) and manager.
- 7 April – Chryssie Lytton Cobbold, Baroness Cobbold, 83, British aristocrat and organiser of the Knebworth Festival.
- 8 April
  - Keith Barnes, 89, Welsh-born Australian Hall of Fame rugby league player (Balmain Tigers, New South Wales, national team), coach and commentator.
  - Sir Paul Fox, 98, British television producer (BBC Television).
  - Peter Higgs, 94, British theoretical physicist, discoverer of the Higgs boson, Nobel Prize laureate (2013).
- 9 April
  - Dave Mehmet, 63, English football player (Millwall, Gillingham) and manager. (death announced on this date)
  - Toby Simkin, 59, English theatrical producer. (death announced on this date)
- 10 April
  - Richard Rosser, Baron Rosser, 79, British trade unionist and politician, member of the House of Lords (since 2004).
  - Kim Taplin, 80, British poet and writer. (death announced on this date)
  - Ted Toleman, 86, British motor racing executive, founder of Toleman.
- 14 April – Angela Redgrave, 106, dance teacher and recipient of the British Empire Medal. (death announced on this date)
- 14 April
  - Vincent Friell, 64, Scottish actor (Trainspotting, Restless Natives, The Angels' Share).
  - Willie Limond, 45, Scottish boxer and footballer (Albion Rovers), complications from a seizure.
- 15 April – Derek Underwood, 78, English cricketer (Kent, national team), complications from dementia.
- 16 April – Michael Donovan, 54, orchestrated the 2008 kidnapping of Shannon Matthews.
- 18 April
  - Sir Chips Keswick, 84, British merchant banker, chairman of Arsenal F.C. (2013–2020).
  - Dave Moyes, 68, Scottish footballer (Berwick Rangers, Meadowbank Thistle, Dunfermline Athletic).
  - Raman Subba Row, 92, English cricketer (Surrey, Northamptonshire, national team). (death announced on this date)
- 19 April – Leighton James, 71, Welsh footballer (Burnley, Swansea City, national team).
- 20 April
  - Sir Andrew Davis, 80, English conductor.
  - Doreen Massey, Baroness Massey of Darwen, 85, British politician, member of the House of Lords (since 1999).
- 21 April – MC Duke, British rapper.
- 22 April – Miss Jason, 56, British drag queen.
- 23 April
  - George Baker, 88, Welsh footballer (Plymouth Argyle, national team).
  - Frank Field, Baron Field of Birkenhead, 81, British politician, MP (1979–2019) and member of the House of Lords (since 2020), prostate cancer.
  - Fergie MacDonald, 86, Scottish accordionist.
  - David Marquand, 89, British politician and academic administrator, MP (1966–1977) and principal of Mansfield College, Oxford (1996–2002).
- 24 April
  - John O'Shea, 83, Welsh rugby union player (Cardiff RFC, British & Irish Lions, national team). (death announced on this date)
  - Mike Pinder, 82, English Hall of Fame musician (The Moody Blues) and songwriter ("The Best Way to Travel", "A Simple Game").
- 25 April
  - Bob Appleby, 84, English footballer (Middlesbrough).
  - Keith Wainwright, 79, British hairdresser. (death announced on this date)
- 27 April – C. J. Sansom, 71, British novelist (Shardlake series).
- 28 April
  - Stephen Grimason, 87, Northern Irish journalist and editor of BBC News NI. (death announced on this date)
  - Brian McCardie, 59, Scottish actor (Rob Roy, Speed 2: Cruise Control, Ellie Parker) and writer.
- 29 April
  - Christian, 80, Scottish singer and entertainer.
  - Andrew Stunell, Baron Stunell, 81, British politician, MP (1997–2015) and member of the House of Lords (since 2015).

== May ==
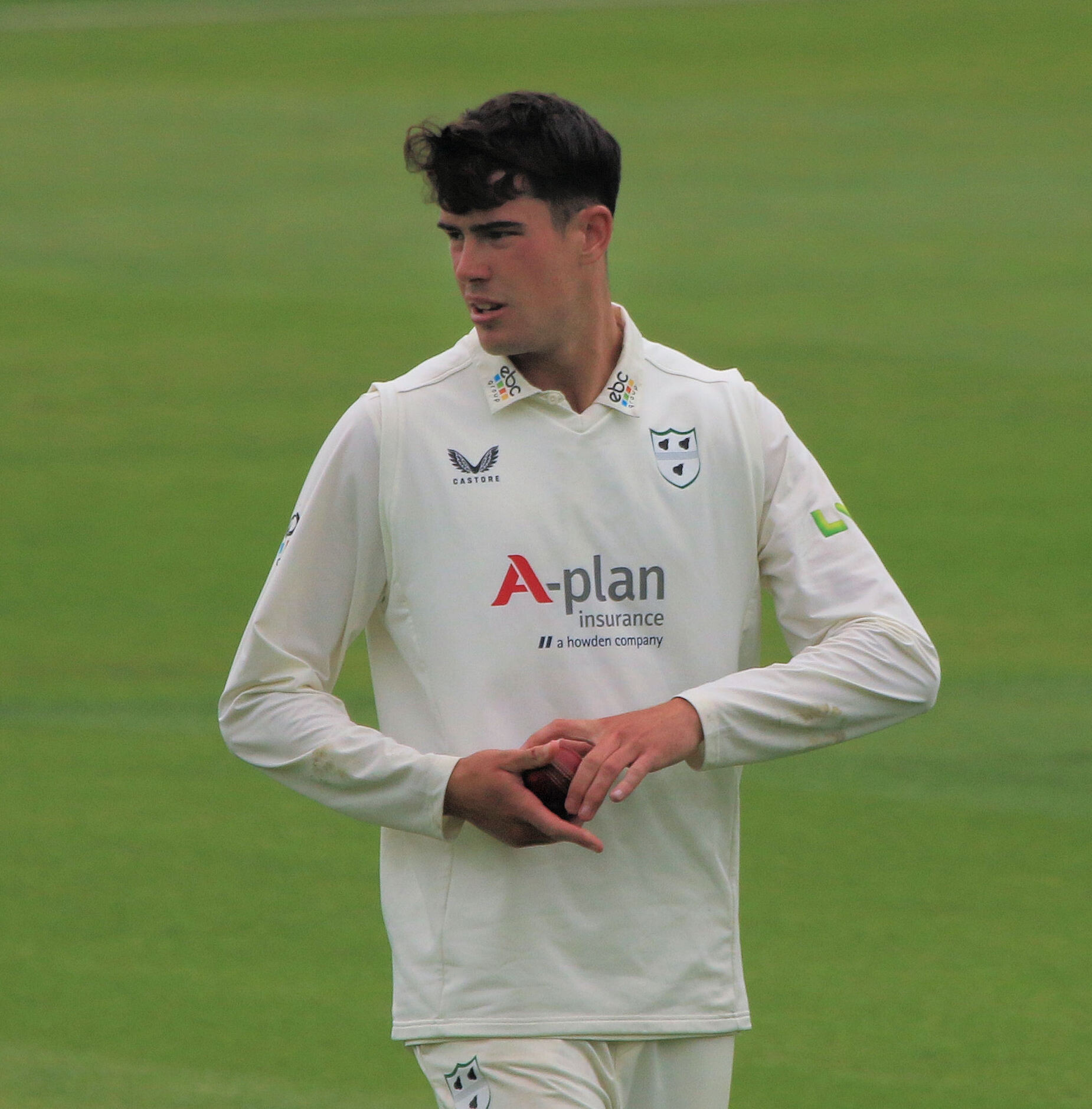
Josh Baker in 2023

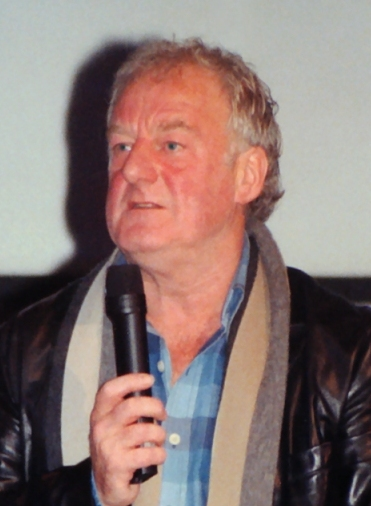
Bernard Hill in 2004

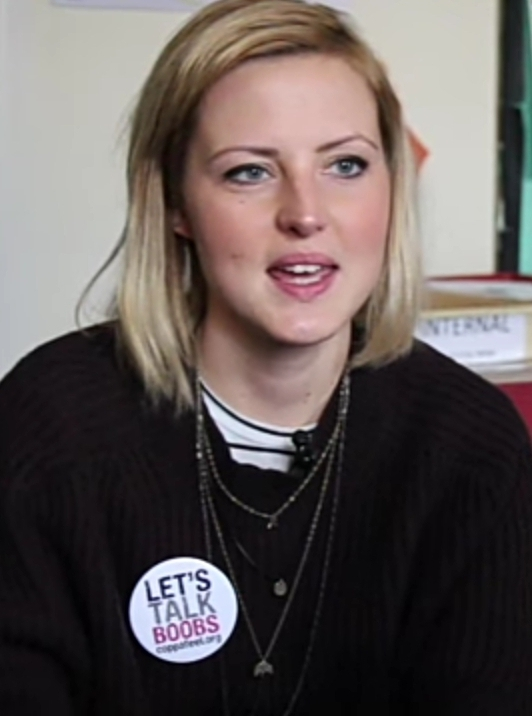
Kristin Hallenga in 2015

- 1 May
  - Ian Mellor, 74, English footballer (Manchester City, Brighton, Sheffield Wednesday), amyloidosis.
  - Richard Tandy, 76, English Hall of Fame musician (Electric Light Orchestra, The Move).
- 2 May
  - Josh Baker, 20, English cricketer (Worcestershire).
  - Peter Oosterhuis, 75, English golfer and broadcaster (CBS Sports), complications from Alzheimer's disease.
- 3 May – Jim Rodger, 90, Scottish footballer (St Mirren, Rangers, Queen of the South).
- 5 May
  - Bernard Hill, 79, English actor (The Lord of the Rings, Titanic, Boys from the Blackstuff).
  - Phil Hoadley, 72, English footballer (Orient, Norwich City, Crystal Palace).
- 6 May
  - Ian Gelder, 74, British actor (Game of Thrones, Torchwood, Little Dorrit).
  - Kristin Hallenga, 38, English breast cancer awareness activist (CoppaFeel!). (death announced on this date)
- 8 May
  - Viv Busby, 74, English football player (Luton Town, Fulham) and manager (Hartlepool United). (death announced on this date)
  - Paul Holmes, 56, English footballer (Torquay United, Everton, West Bromwich Albion). (death announced on this date)
- 9 May – Dame Shirley Conran, 91, British writer.
- 10 May – Colin Breed, 76, British politician, MP (1997–2010). (death announced on this date)
- 12 May
  - Michael Brudenell-Bruce, 8th Marquess of Ailesbury, 98, British hereditary peer, army officer and stockbroker, member of the House of Lords (1974–1999).
  - Sir Clive Johnstone, 60, British Royal Navy officer.
- 14 May
  - Owen John Thomas, 84, Welsh politician, MNA (1999–2007). (death announced on this date)
  - Gudrun Ure, 98, Scottish actress (Super Gran, The Million Pound Note, The Crow Road).
- 15 May – John Hawken, 84, English keyboardist (The Nashville Teens, Renaissance, Strawbs).
- 16 May – Barry Kemp, 83–84, English archaeologist and egyptologist. (death announced on this date)
- 17 May
  - Pat Buckley, 72, Irish Independent Catholic bishop. (death announced on this date)
  - Sharkey Ward, 80, British Royal Navy officer.
- 19 May – Ian Hamilton, 73, English footballer (Aston Villa, Sheffield United, Minnesota Kicks). (death announced on this date)
- 20 May – Gerry Collins, 69, Scottish football player (Ayr United, Hamilton Academical, Partick Thistle) and manager.
- 22 May – David Wilkie, 70, Scottish swimmer, Olympic champion (1976), world champion (1973, 1975), cancer.
- 23 May – Sir John Boardman, 96, British archaeologist and art historian.
- 24 May
  - Derek Morgan, 88, Welsh-English rugby union player (Northumberland, England national team).
- 25 May
  - Madge Elliot, 95, Scottish rail activist, Alzheimer's disease.
  - Leah Levin, 98, human rights activist.
- 26 May – Georgie Campbell, 37, British event rider.
- 28 May – Malcolm Fairley, 72, British criminal and sex offender dubbed "The Fox".
- 29 May
  - Ron Ayers, 92, English engineer (ThrustSSC, JCB Dieselmax).
  - Sir Mansel Aylward, 81, public health physician and academic
  - John Burnside, 69, Scottish writer and poet.
- 30 May
  - Dorothy Bromiley, 93, British actress (The Girls of Pleasure Island, It's Great to Be Young, A Touch of the Sun). (death announced on this date)
  - Trevor Edwards, 87, Welsh footballer (Charlton Athletic, Cardiff City, national team). (death announced on this date)
- 31 May – Geoff Follin, 58, English video game composer (Silver Surfer, Plok!, Rock n' Roll Racing). (death announced on this date)

== June ==
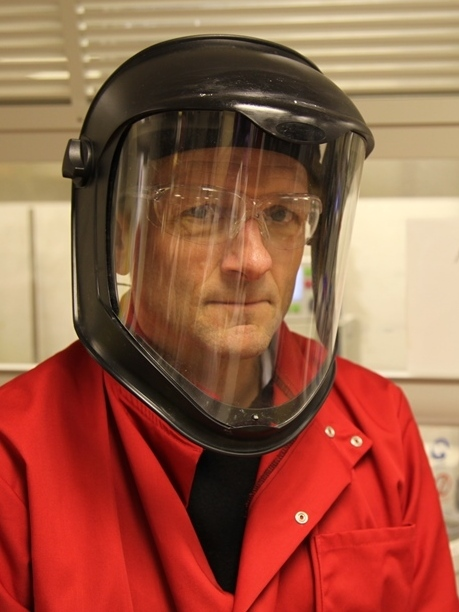
Michael Mosley in 2016

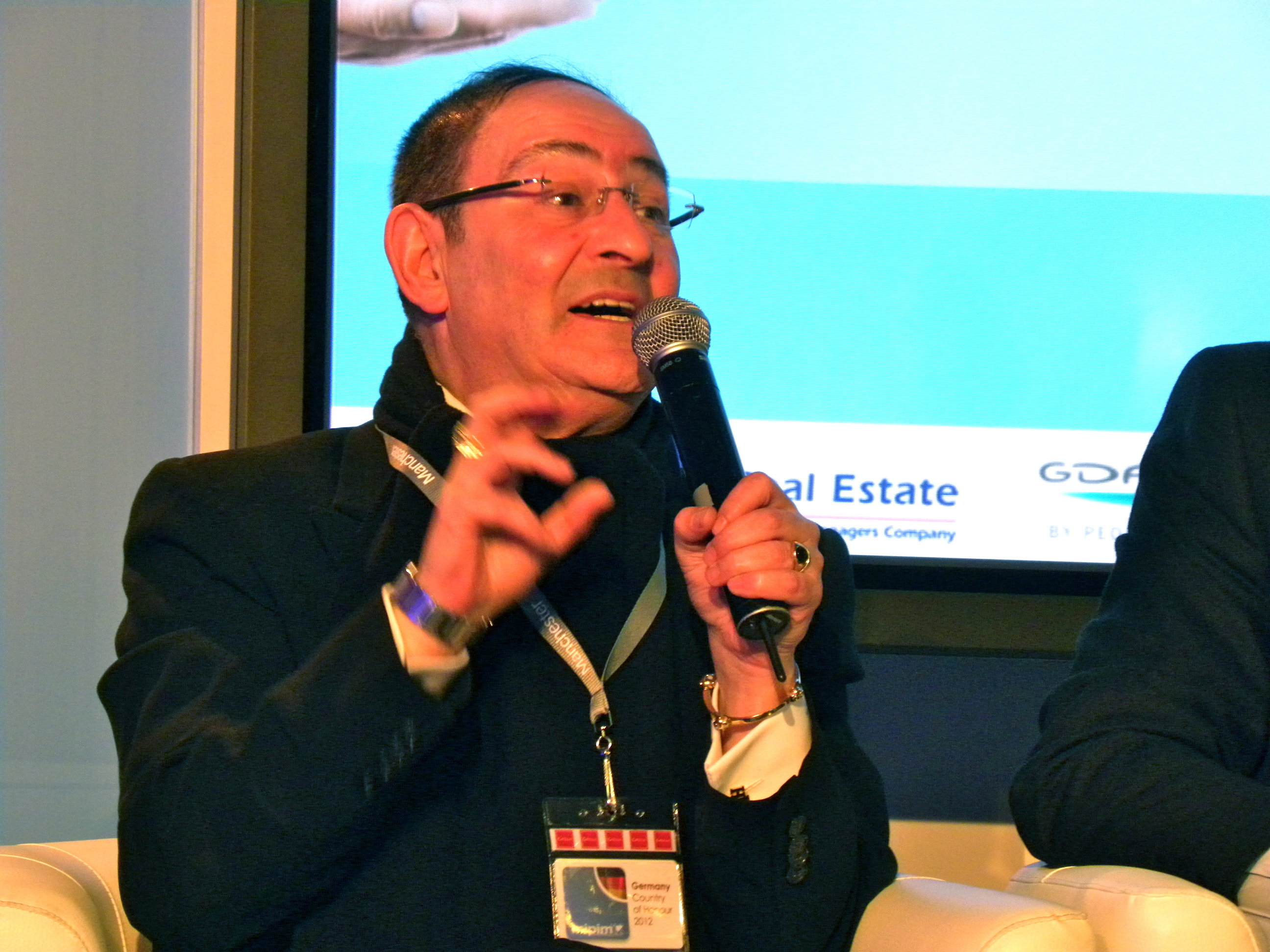
Howard Bernstein in 2012

- 2 June
  - Rob Burrow, 41, English rugby league footballer (Leeds Rhinos, Yorkshire, national team), complications from motor neurone disease.
  - Jeannette Charles, 96, British actress (Saturday Night Live, Q..., Big Brother).
  - Harold Snoad, 88, British television producer, writer and director (Keeping Up Appearances, Ever Decreasing Circles, Don't Wait Up).
- 3 June – William Russell, 99, English actor (Doctor Who, Coronation Street, The Adventures of Sir Lancelot).
- 5 June
  - Charles Allsopp, 6th Baron Hindlip, 83, British peer and businessman, member of the House of Lords (1993–1999).
  - Michael Mosley, 67, British television journalist, producer, presenter and writer (BBC).
  - Farrel O'Shea, 60, British professional windsurfer. (death reported on this date)
  - David Scott, 83, Scottish journalist and broadcaster (Scottish Daily Express, BBC Scotland, STV). (death announced on this date)
- 6 June
  - Nicholas Ball, 78, English actor (Hazell, EastEnders, Footballers' Wives). (death announced on this date)
  - Glan Letheren, 68, Welsh footballer (Leeds United, Chesterfield, Swansea City).
  - Sir Oliver Popplewell, 96, British judge (Bradford City stadium fire) and cricketer (Cambridge University, Free Foresters).
- 7 June – Rose-Marie, 68, Northern Irish singer and television personality.
- 9 June – Simon Cowell, 72, British television presenter (Wildlife SOS) and conservationist, founder of Wildlife Aid Foundation.
- 10 June
  - Terry Allcock, 88, English footballer (Bolton Wanderers, Norwich City) and cricketer (Norfolk).
  - Willie Carlin, 83, English footballer (Halifax Town, Carlisle United, Derby County).
- 11 June
  - Gaps Hendrickson, British musician and vocalist (The Selecter). (death reported on this date)
  - Ethel Lote, 103, English World War II nurse and yoga instructor.
- 13 June
  - Tommy Banks, 94, English footballer (Bolton Wanderers, Altrincham, national team). (death announced on this date)
  - Courtney Meredith, 97, Welsh rugby player (British Lions, national team).
  - Kate Rackham, teacher and charity campaigner. (death reported on this date)
- 15 June
  - Kevin Campbell, 54, English footballer (Arsenal, Nottingham Forest, Everton). (death announced on this date)
  - Frank D'Arcy, 77, English footballer (Everton, Tranmere Rovers, Kirkby Town).
  - Matija Šarkić, 26, English-born Montenegrin footballer (Shrewsbury Town, Millwall, national team).
- 17 June
  - Brian Makepeace, 92, English footballer (Doncaster Rovers, Boston United). (death announced on this date)
  - Paul Spencer, 53, English musician (Dario G).
- 18 June – Billy Abercromby, 65, Scottish footballer (St Mirren, Partick Thistle, Dunfermline Athletic). (death announced on this date)
- 19 June – Claudia Williams, 90, Welsh artist.
- 22 June – Howard Bernstein, 71, British civil servant, chief executive of Manchester City Council (1998–2017).
- 26 June
  - Pat Heywood, 92, Scottish actress (Romeo and Juliet, Goodbye, Mr. Chips, 10 Rillington Place).
  - Richard Taylor, 89, British politician, MP (2001–2010).
- 27 June
  - Sir Jack Petchey, 98, English football executive and philanthropist, chairman of Watford (1987–1994).
  - Donald Scott, 96, Scottish rugby union player (Langholm, South of Scotland District, national team).
- 28 June – Joss Naylor, 88, English fell runner.
- 29 June
  - Johnny Cooke, 89, English boxer, pneumonia.
  - Eirlys Parri, 74, Welsh singer.
- 30 June – Peter Collins, 73, English record producer (Power Windows, Operation: Mindcrime, These Days). (death announced on this date)

== July ==
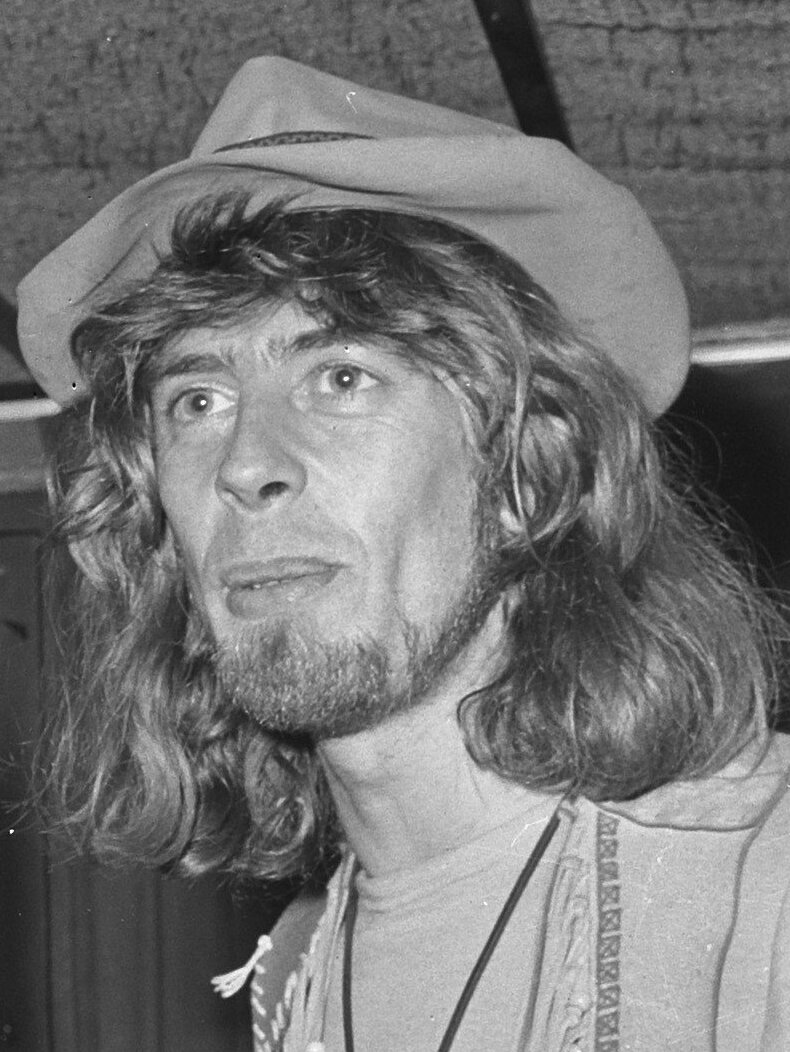
John Mayall in 1968

- 1 July – Jack Rowell, 87, English rugby union coach (Bath, national team) and executive.
- 2 July – Jeff Whitefoot, 90, English footballer (Nottingham Forest, Manchester United, Grimsby Town). (death announced on this date)
- 4 July
  - Ysanne Churchman, 99, English actress (The Archers, Doctor Who).
  - Tony Knight, 54, English comedian.
- 5 July – Yvonne Furneaux, 98, French-British actress (La dolce vita, The Mummy, Replusion).
- 6 July
  - Joe Egan, 77, Scottish singer (Stealers Wheel) and songwriter ("Stuck in the Middle with You", "Star").
  - Dudley Roberts, 78, English footballer (Coventry City, Mansfield Town, Scunthorpe United). (death announced on this date)
  - Roberta Taylor, 76, English actress (EastEnders, The Bill, Shakespeare & Hathaway: Private Investigators) and author.
- 7 July – Rachel Wyatt, 94, English-Canadian dramatist.
- 9 July – Ian Buckett, 56, Welsh rugby union player (Swansea RFC, London Welsh, national team).
- 11 July – Tony "Doc" Shiels, 85–86, British artist, magician, and writer.
- 12 July – Ian Cameron, 74, British car designer (Rolls-Royce).
- 15 July – Simon Boas, 47, British humanitarian aid worker.
- 16 July – April Cantelo, 96, English soprano.
- 17 July – Heather Wood, 79, English folk singer (The Young Tradition). (death announced on this date)
- 19 July
  - Ray Reardon, 91, Welsh professional snooker player.
  - Ron Stockin, 93, English footballer (Wolverhampton Wanderers, Cardiff City, Grimsby Town). (death announced on this date)
- 21 July – Sir Kenneth Grange, 95, British industrial designer (InterCity 125).
- 22 July
  - Beccy Barr, 46, British journalist, TV presenter and firefighter.
  - John Mayall, 90, English blues and rock musician.
  - Alexander Waugh, 60, English writer, critic and journalist.
- 23 July – Barry Reed, 86, English cricketer (Hampshire, MCC). (death announced on this date)
- 24 July
  - Boris, 58, chimpanzee at Chester Zoo.
  - Fred Potter, 83, English footballer (Aston Villa, Doncaster Rovers, Hereford United). (death announced on this date)
- 26 July – John Bennett, 82, Northern Irish broadcaster.
- 27 July – Kenneth Standring, 89, English cricketer (Lancashire). (death announced on this date)
- 28 July
  - John Anderson, 92, Scottish television referee (Gladiators).
  - Peter Morgan, 65, Welsh rugby player (British & Irish Lions, Llanelli, national team). (death announced on this date)
- 29 July
  - Robert Fellowes, Baron Fellowes, 82, British courtier, private secretary to the sovereign (1990–1999) and member of the House of Lords (1999–2022).
  - Peter Reddaway, 84, British-American political scientist.
- 30 July – Lisa Westcott, 76, British makeup artist (Shakespeare in Love, Les Misérables).
- 31 July – DJ Randall, 54, British DJ and record producer.

== August ==
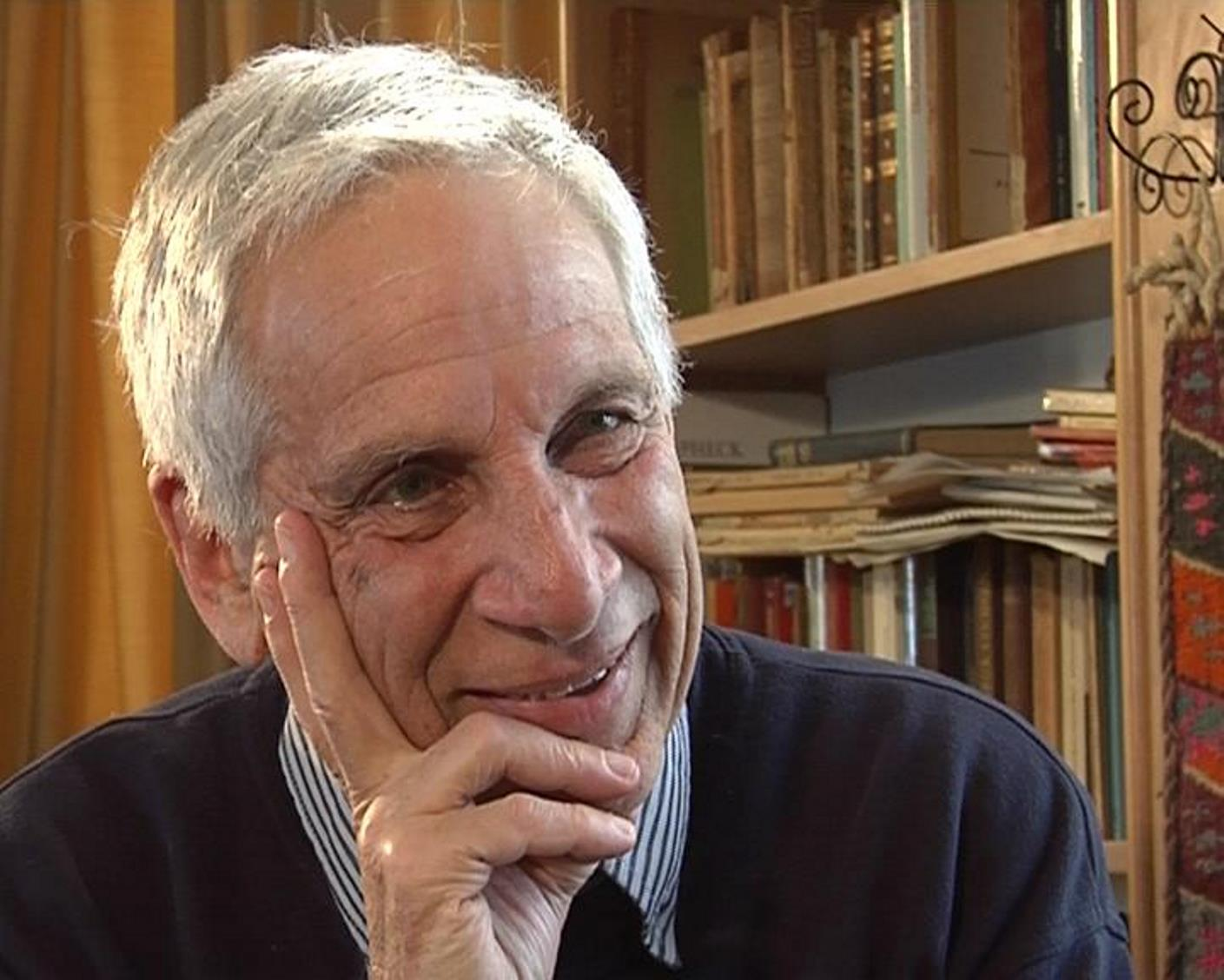
Alexander Goehr in 2007

- 1 August – Craig Shakespeare, 60, English football player (Walsall, West Bromwich Albion) and manager (Leicester City).
- 2 August
  - Alun Carter, 59, Welsh rugby union player (Pontypool RFC, national team).
  - Tommy Cassidy, 73, Northern Irish football player (Newcastle, national team) and manager (APOEL). (death announced on this date)
  - Paul Darling, 64, English barrister, chairman of the Levy Board (since 2020).
- 3 August – Sir Ernest Hall, 94, English businessman, pianist and composer.
- 4 August
  - Jim Doherty, 65, Scottish footballer (Kilmarnock, Clyde, Queen of the South).
  - Anthony Hamilton-Smith, 3rd Baron Colwyn, 82, British dentist and peer, member of the House of Lords (1967–2022).
  - Sir David Harcourt-Smith, 92, British air force officer, commander-in-chief Support Command (1984–1986).
  - Jeremy Strong, 74, British writer.
- 5 August
  - Henry Downs, 92, British amateur bodybuilder, Mr. Universe (1960).
  - George Herd, 88, Scottish football player (Sunderland, national team) and manager (Queen of the South).
  - Graham Thorpe, 55, English cricketer (Surrey, national team).
- 6 August
  - Ron Bain, 79, Scottish actor (Naked Video, A Kick Up the Eighties) and director (I, Lovett). (death announced on this date)
  - Bobby Thomson, 87, Scottish footballer (Aston Villa, Birmingham City).
- 7 August – Neil Stanley, 56, English cricketer (Bedfordshire, Northamptonshire).
- 8 August – Alan Little, 69, English football player (Southend United, Barnsley) and manager (York City). (death announced on this date)
- 9 August
  - Carl Bevan, 51, Welsh rock drummer (60 Ft. Dolls) and painter. (death announced on this date)
  - Brian Marjoribanks, 82, Scottish footballer (Hibernian), actor and broadcaster (BBC Scotland).
- 12 August
  - Timothy Dudley-Smith, 97, English Anglican prelate and hymn writer.
  - Roy Greaves, 77, English footballer (Bolton Wanderers, Seattle Sounders, Rochdale).
  - Alex Kinninmouth, 82, Scottish footballer (Dundee, Dunfermline Athletic, Forfar Athletic). (death announced on this date)
- 13 August
  - Tony Blackman, 96, British aviator.
  - Charles Hughes, 91, English football coach and director (English FA). (death announced on this date)
- 15 August – Jim McLaughlin, 83, Northern Irish football player (Shrewsbury Town, national team) and manager (Derry City). (death announced on this date)
- 16 August
  - Charles Blackwell, 84, English arranger, record producer and songwriter. (death announced on this date)
  - Peter Procter, 94, British cyclist and racing driver, lung cancer. (death announced on this date)
  - Robert Sidaway, 82, English actor (Doctor Who, Crossroads).
- 17 August – Virginia Ogilvy, Countess of Airlie, 91, American-born British aristocrat, lady of the bedchamber to Queen Elizabeth II (1973–2022).
- 19 August – Mike Lynch, 59, British technology entrepreneur, co-founder of Autonomy Corporation and Darktrace.
- 20 August – John Clegg, 90, British actor (It Ain't Half Hot Mum, Tom & Viv, Shooting Fish). (death announced on this date)
- 21 August
  - David Anfam, 69, English art historian, curator and author.
  - Russell Stone, 77–78, English singer (R&J Stone).
- 22 August
  - Camilla Mary Carr, 66, British aid worker.
  - Rodney Smithson, 80, English football player (Oxford United, Arsenal) and manager (Witney Town). (death announced on this date)
  - Dewi "Pws" Morris, 76, Welsh actor (Grand Slam), singer and television presenter. (death announced on this date)
  - Delwyn Williams, 85, British politician and solicitor, MP (1979–1983).
- 23 August – Bette Bourne, 84, British actor, drag queen and activist.
- 24 August – Stephen E. Thorpe, 54, English-born New Zealand entomologist.
- 26 August – Alexander Goehr, 92, German-born English composer and academic.
- 27 August – Richard Macphail, 73, English musician (Anon), road manager (Genesis) and businessman.
- 30 August
  - Nicky Gavron, 82, British politician, deputy mayor of London (2000–2003, 2004–2008).
  - Danielle Moore, 52, English musician (Crazy P).
- 31 August – Phil Swern, 76, English radio producer (Sounds of the 60s, Pick of the Pops).

== September ==
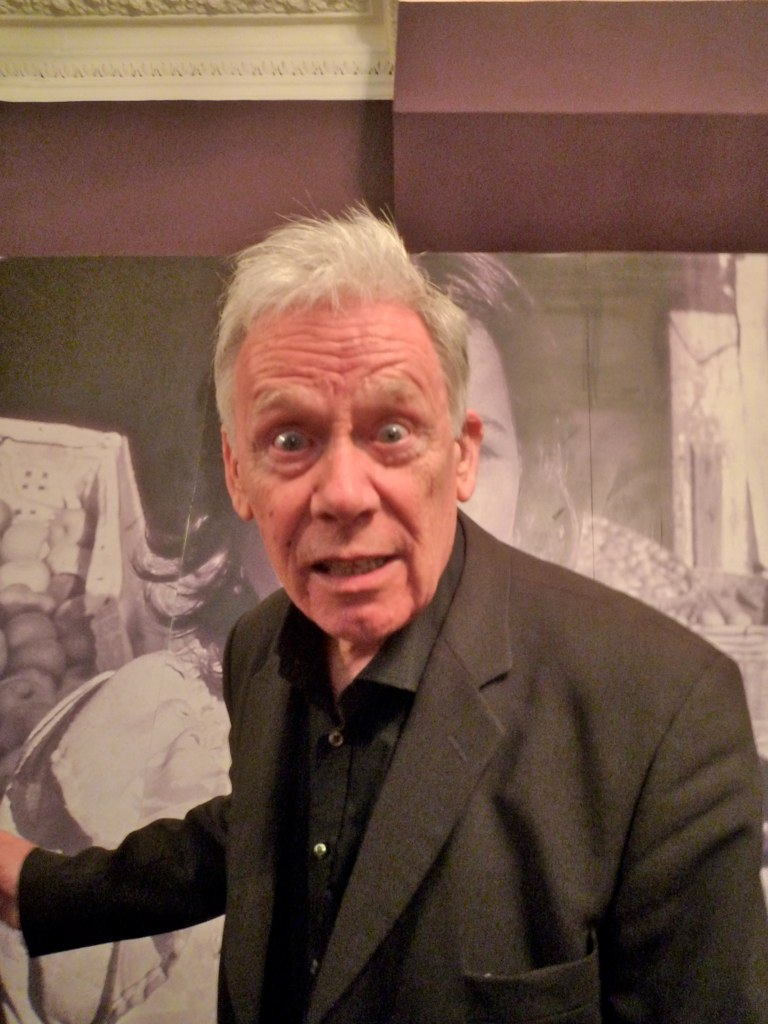
Herbie Flowers in 2013

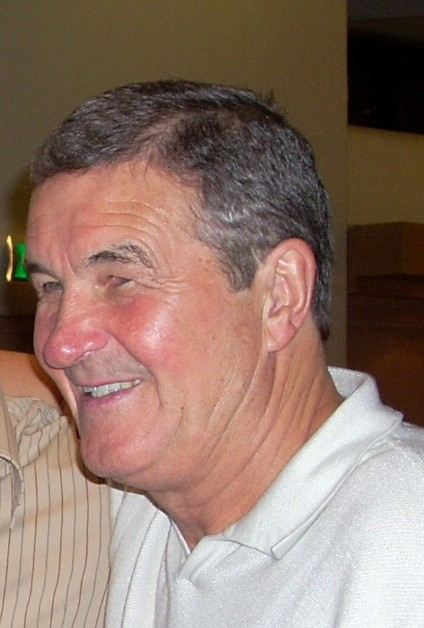
Ron Yeats in 2007

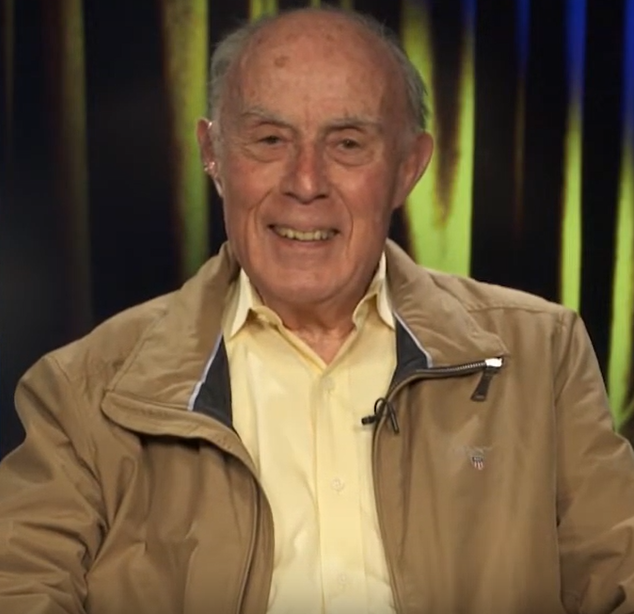
David Graham in 2016

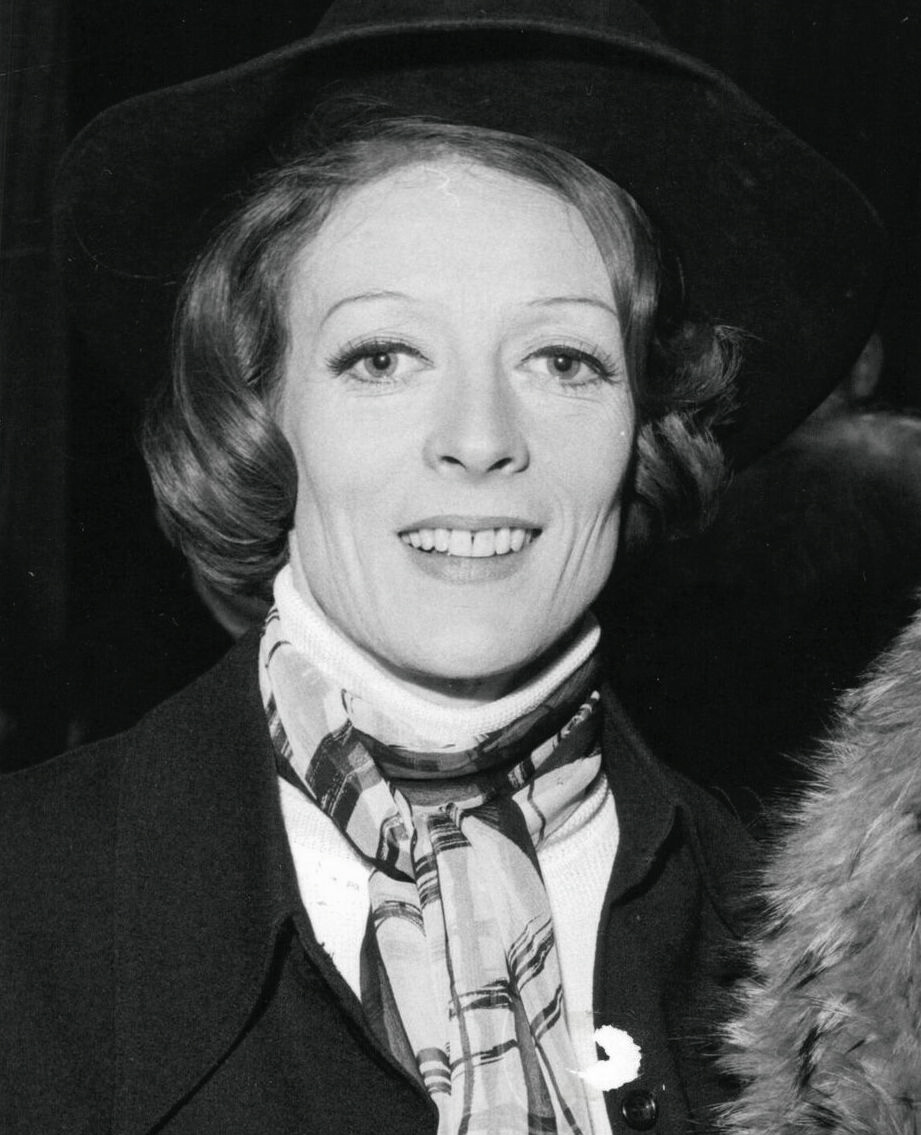
Dame Maggie Smith in 1973

- 1 September – Brian Trueman, 92, English television presenter (ITV Granada) and writer (Danger Mouse, Count Duckula).
- 2 September
  - Derek Draper, 81, Welsh footballer (Swansea City, Bradford Park Avenue, Chester City), complications from dementia. (death announced on this date)
  - Mick Cullen, 93, Scottish footballer (Luton Town, Grimsby Town, national team).
- 3 September
  - Flora Fraser, 21st Lady Saltoun, 93, Scottish peer, member of the House of Lords (1979–2014).
  - Clive Freeman, 61, English footballer (Swansea City, Altrincham, Doncaster Rovers). (death announced on this date)
- 4 September – David Rose, 81, English club secretary (Ipswich Town F.C.). (death announced on this date)
- 5 September
  - Derek Boshier, 87, English pop artist.
  - Herbie Flowers, 86, English bass guitarist (Blue Mink, T. Rex, Sky).
  - Martin France, 60, British jazz drummer.
  - Lady Helen Wogan, 88, wife of Sir Terry Wogan.
- 6 September
  - Alan Rees, 86, British racing driver.
  - Ron Yeats, 86, Scottish footballer (Dundee United, Liverpool, Tranmere Rovers).
- 8 September
  - Zoot Money, 82, English vocalist and keyboardist (Eric Burdon and The Animals, Zoot Money's Big Roll Band).
  - Ben Thapa, 42, English opera singer (G4).
- 11 September – Kenneth Cope, 93, English actor (Randall and Hopkirk (Deceased), Coronation Street).
- 12 September – Robin Guy, 54, British drummer (Sham 69, All About Eve).
- 15 September
  - Geoffrey Hinsliff, 86, English actor (Coronation Street, Brass, Doctor Who).
  - Gary Shaw, 63, English footballer (Aston Villa, Kjøbenhavns Boldklub, Shrewsbury Town).
- 16 September
  - Norman Ackroyd, 86, English visual artist.
  - Dame Elizabeth Esteve-Coll, 85, British academic, director of Victoria and Albert Museum (1987–1994).
  - Steve Hardwick, 68, English footballer (Oxford United, Huddersfield Town, Newcastle United).
  - Chris Serle, 81, British television presenter (That's Life!, The Big Time, Windmill), reporter and actor.
- 17 September – Kenny Hyslop, 73, Scottish drummer (Slik, Zones, Simple Minds). (death announced on this date)
- 18 September
  - Sam Malcolmson, 77, Scottish-born New Zealand footballer (Queen of the South, Albion Rovers, national team).
  - Malcolm Mitchell-Thomson, 3rd Baron Selsdon, 86, British peer, banker and businessman, member of the House of Lords (1963–2021).
  - Sir Patrick Sergeant, 100, British journalist (Daily Mail), investor and businessman, founder of Euromoney Institutional Investor.
  - Tony Soper, 95, British ornithologist and television presenter (Animal Magic).
- 20 September
  - David Graham, 99, English actor (Doctor Who, Thunderbirds, Peppa Pig, Ben and Holly's Little Kingdom).
  - Cleo Sylvestre, 79, English actress (Till Death Us Do Part, Crossroads, The Bill).
- 21 September – Chris Jones, 84, English rock climber and writer. (death announced on this date)
- 22 September – Peter Jay, 87, English economist, broadcaster and diplomat, ambassador of the United Kingdom to the United States (1977–1979).
- 23 September – Rupert Keegan, 69, English racing driver (Formula One, CART).
- 27 September
  - Clive Everton, 87, British professional snooker player, sports commentator and journalist. (death announced on this date)
  - Dame Maggie Smith, 89, English actress (The Prime of Miss Jean Brodie, California Suite, Harry Potter).
- 28 September – Barry Lloyd, 75, English footballer (Fulham, Chelsea) and manager (Yeovil Town). (death announced on this date)
- 29 September
  - Martin Lee, 77, English singer (Brotherhood of Man) and songwriter ("Save Your Kisses for Me", "Angelo"), heart failure.
  - Rohan de Saram, 85, British-born Sri Lankan cellist.
- 30 September – Robert Watts, 86, British film producer (Star Wars, Indiana Jones, Who Framed Roger Rabbit).

== October ==
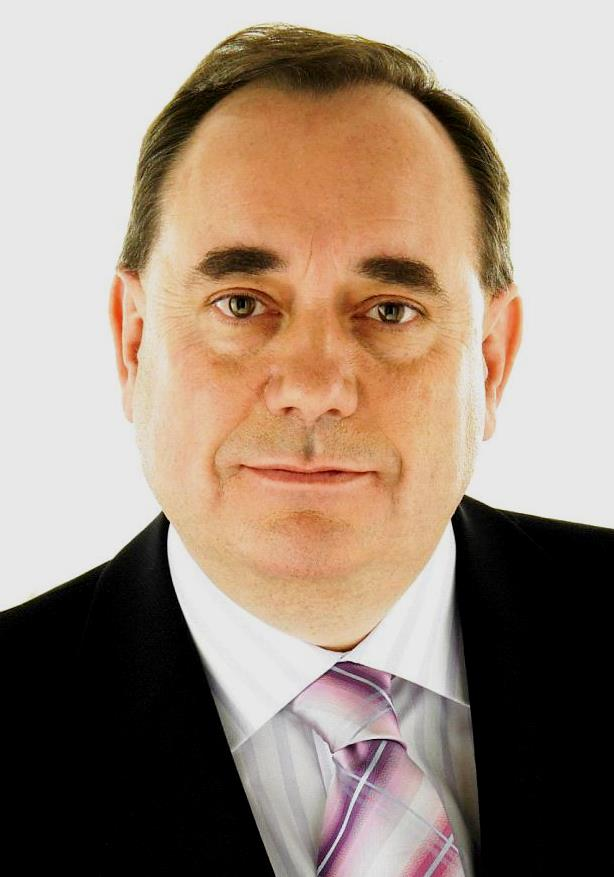
Alex Salmond in 2007

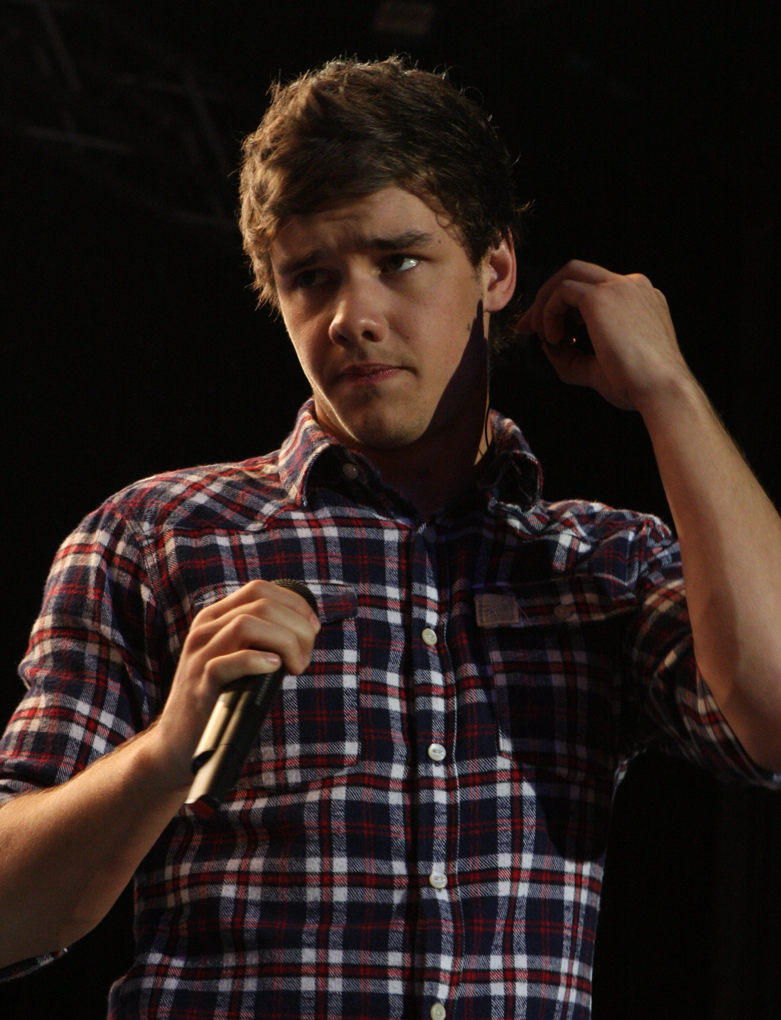
Liam Payne in 2011

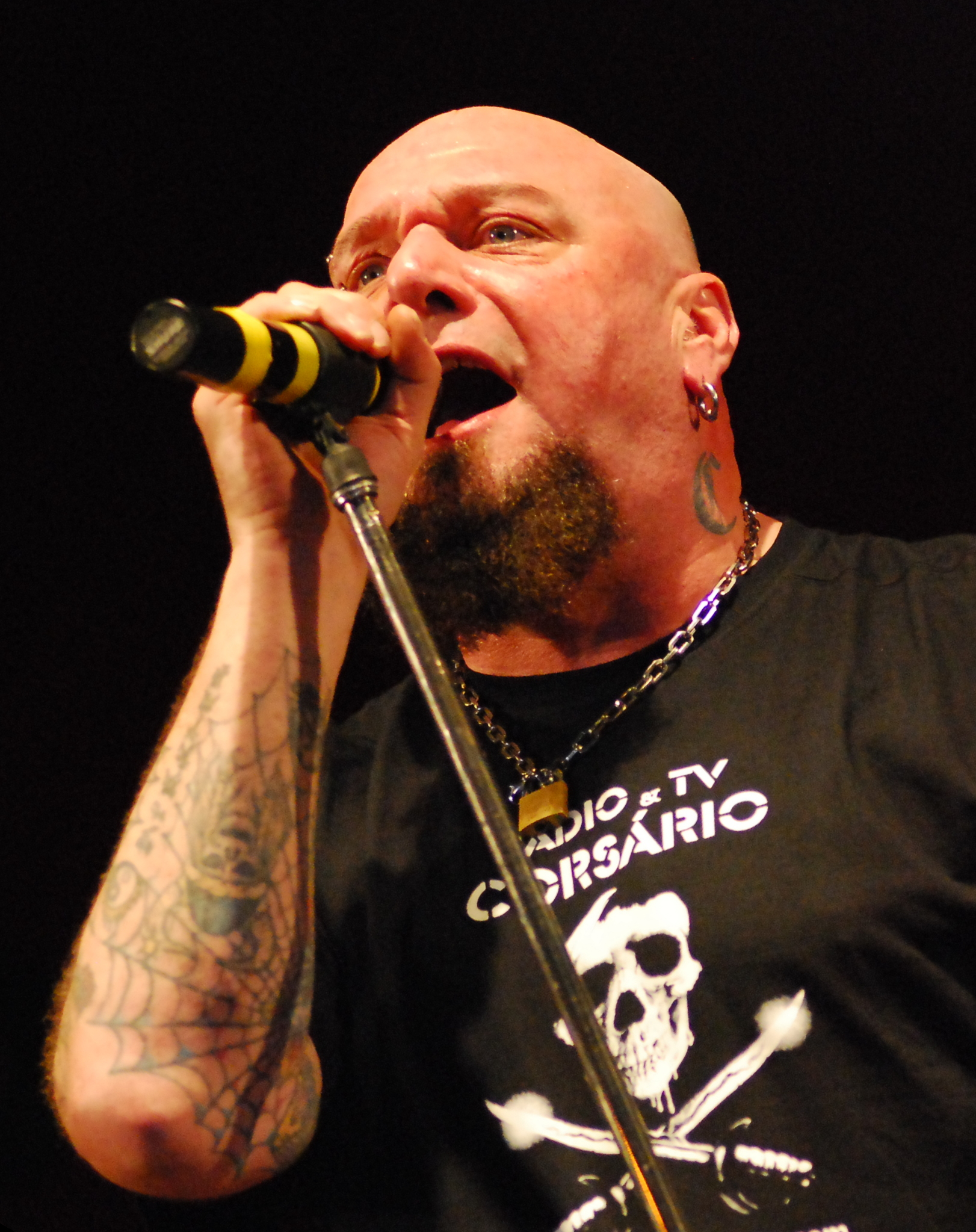
Paul Di'Anno in 2008

- 1 October – Michael Ancram, 13th Marquess of Lothian, 79, British politician and peer, three-times MP, member of the House of Lords (since 2010).
- 2 October
  - Herman Ouseley, Baron Ouseley, 79, Guyanese-born British civil rights activist and politician, member of the House of Lords (2001–2019).
  - Richard Woodman, 80, English novelist and naval historian.
- 4 October – Alexander Leitch, Baron Leitch, 76, British businessman and life peer, member of the House of Lords (since 2004).
- 5 October – Timothy Darvill, 66, English archaeologist.
- 7 October
  - Hugh Cholmondeley, 5th Baron Delamere, 90, British peer, member of the House of Lords (1979–1999).
  - Robbie Fitzgibbon, 28, British middle distance runner.
  - Kathy Plaistowe, British ballet dancer and audition manager (Les Ballets de Monte-Carlo).
- 8 October – Sir Geoffrey Pattie, 88, British politician, MP (1974–1997).
- 9 October
  - George Baldock, 31, English-born Greek footballer (Milton Keynes Dons, Sheffield United, Greece national team), drowned. (body discovered on this date)
  - Lily Ebert, 100, Hungarian-born Holocaust survivor and writer.
- 10 October
  - Peter Cormack, 78, Scottish football player (Hibernian, Liverpool, national team) and manager (Partick Thistle).
  - Brian Lockwood, 78, English rugby league footballer (Castleford, Hull Kingston Rovers, national team).
- 11 October – Kevin Bowring, 70, Welsh rugby union player (London Welsh) and coach (national team). (death announced on this date)
- 12 October
  - Jackmaster, 38, Scottish DJ and record producer.
  - Alex Salmond, 69, Scottish politician, first minister (2007–2014).
- 13 October – Jim Liddle, 66, Scottish footballer (Forfar Athletic, Cowdenbeath, Hamilton Academical).
- 14 October – Dame Janet Nelson, 82, British historian.
- 15 October
  - Sir Mike Jackson, 80, British general, prostate cancer.
  - Andrew Stahl, British painter. (death announced on this date)
- 16 October
  - Liam Payne, 31, English singer (One Direction).
  - Roy Walsh, 75, Northern Irish Provisional IRA volunteer and convicted criminal (1973 Old Bailey bombing).
- 20 October – Paul White, Baron Hanningfield, 84, British politician and peer, member of the House of Lords (since 1998).
- 21 October – Paul Di'Anno, 66, English heavy metal singer (Iron Maiden, Gogmagog). (death announced on this date)
- 22 October
  - Graham Blyth, 76, English audio engineer.
  - Jim McColl, 89, British television presenter (Beechgrove).
  - Myra McFadyen, 68, Scottish actress (Made of Honor, Mamma Mia!, Emma). (death announced on this date)
  - Dick Pope, 77, British cinematographer (Mr. Turner, The Illusionist, Motherless Brooklyn).
  - Robert Willis, 77, English Anglican priest, dean of Hereford (1992–2000) and Canterbury (2001–2022).
- 23 October – Geoff Capes, 75, British Olympic shot putter (1972, 1976, 1980) and strongman.
- 25 October
  - Tommy Callaghan, 78, Scottish football player (Dunfermline Athletic, Celtic, Clydebank) and manager.
  - Alan Simpson, 84, British Olympic runner (1964). (death announced on this date)
- 26 October – Stephanie Collie, 60, English costume designer (Lock, Stock and Two Smoking Barrels, Layer Cake, Peaky Blinders).
- 30 October – Brian Tesler, 95, British television producer and executive.
- 31 October
  - Candy Devine, 85, Australian radio broadcaster (Downtown Radio) and singer. (death announced on this date)
  - Alastair Down, 68, English journalist and broadcaster (Racing Post, Channel 4 Racing).
  - Trevor Whymark, 74, English footballer (Ipswich Town, Grimsby Town, national team).

== November ==
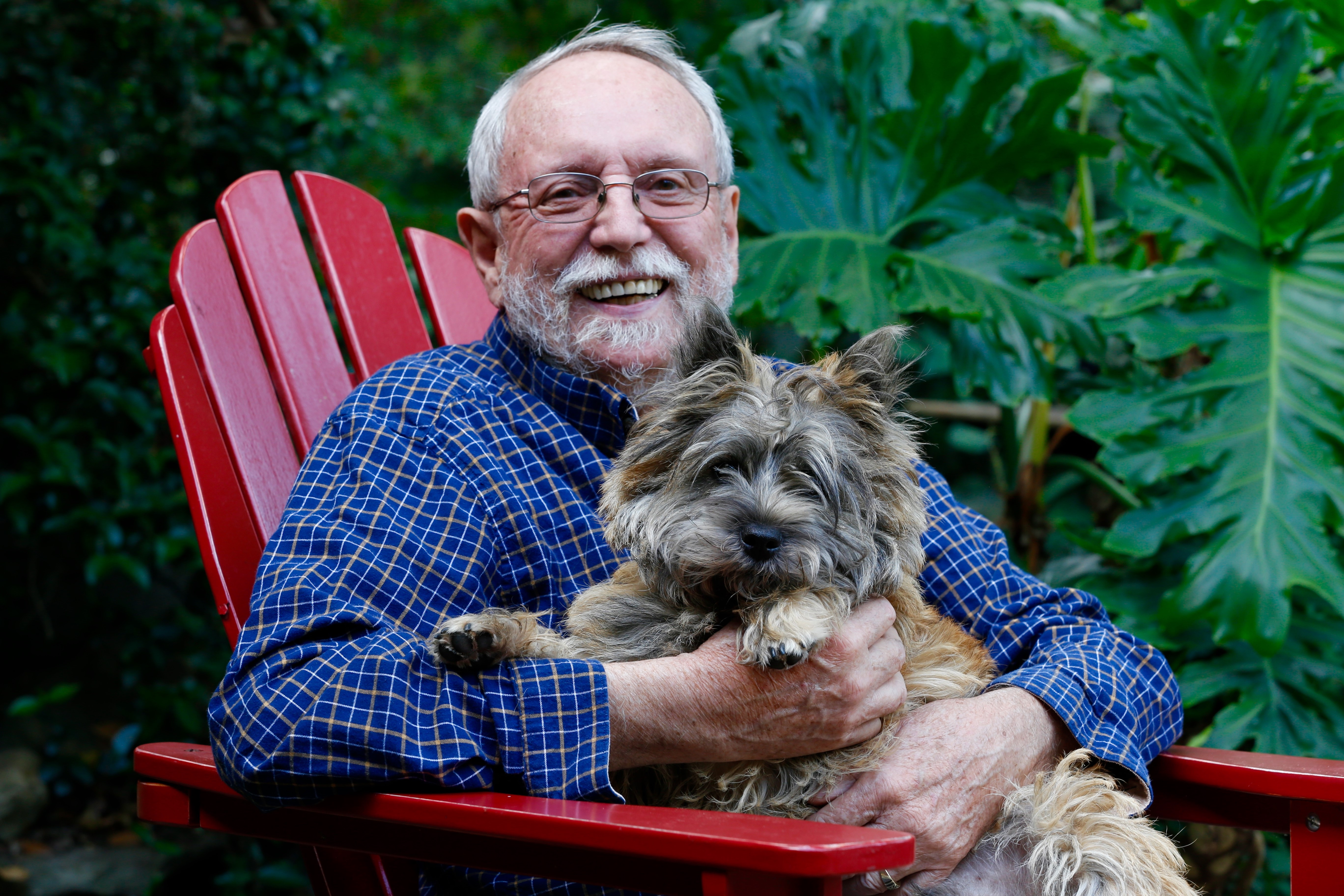
Michael Ruse in 2020

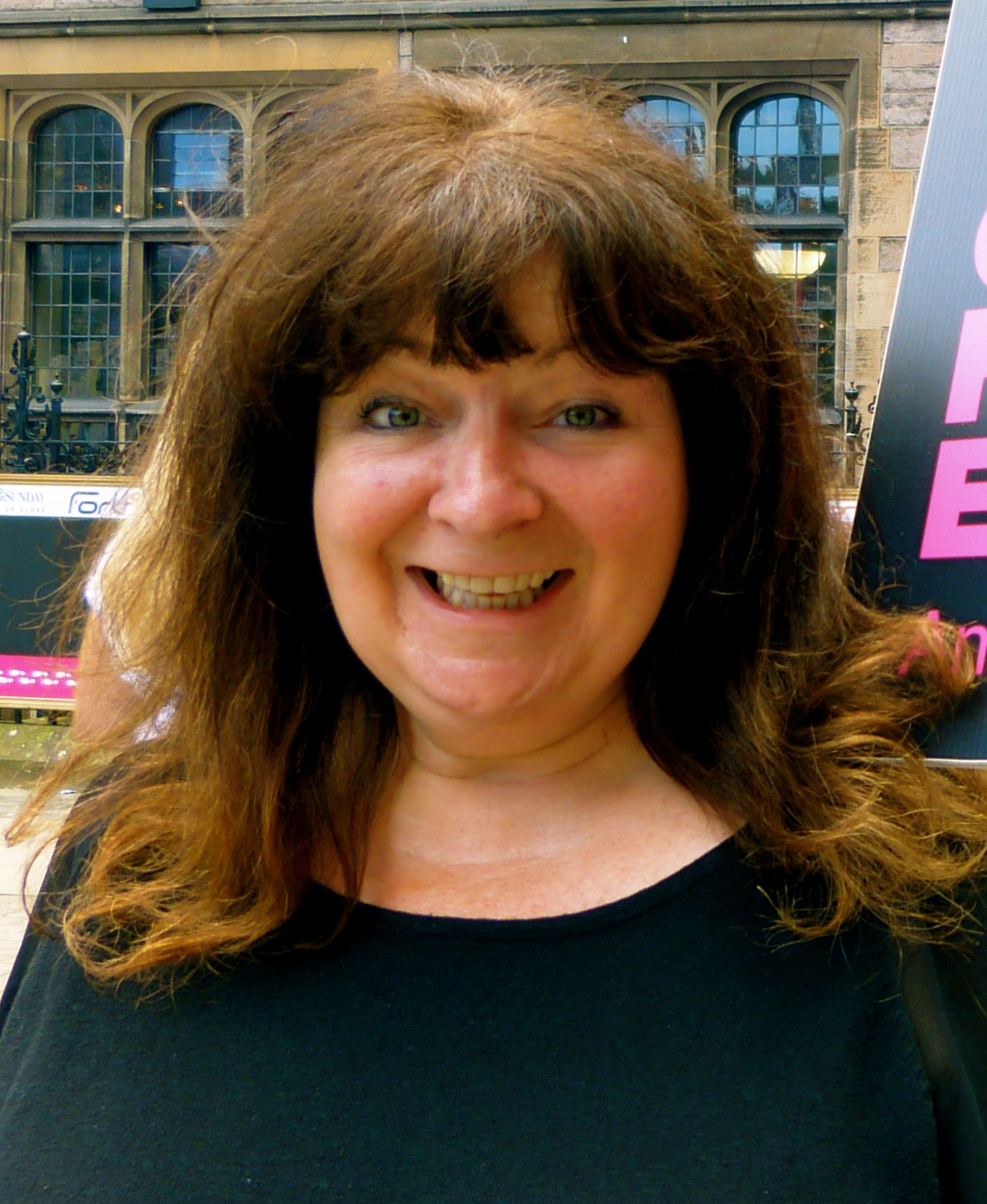
Janey Godley in 2013

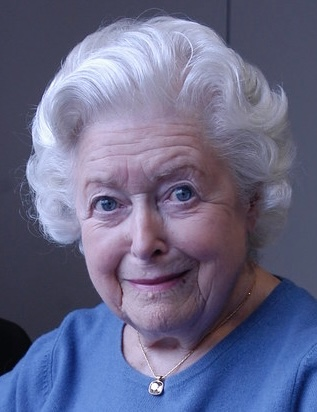
June Spencer in 2009

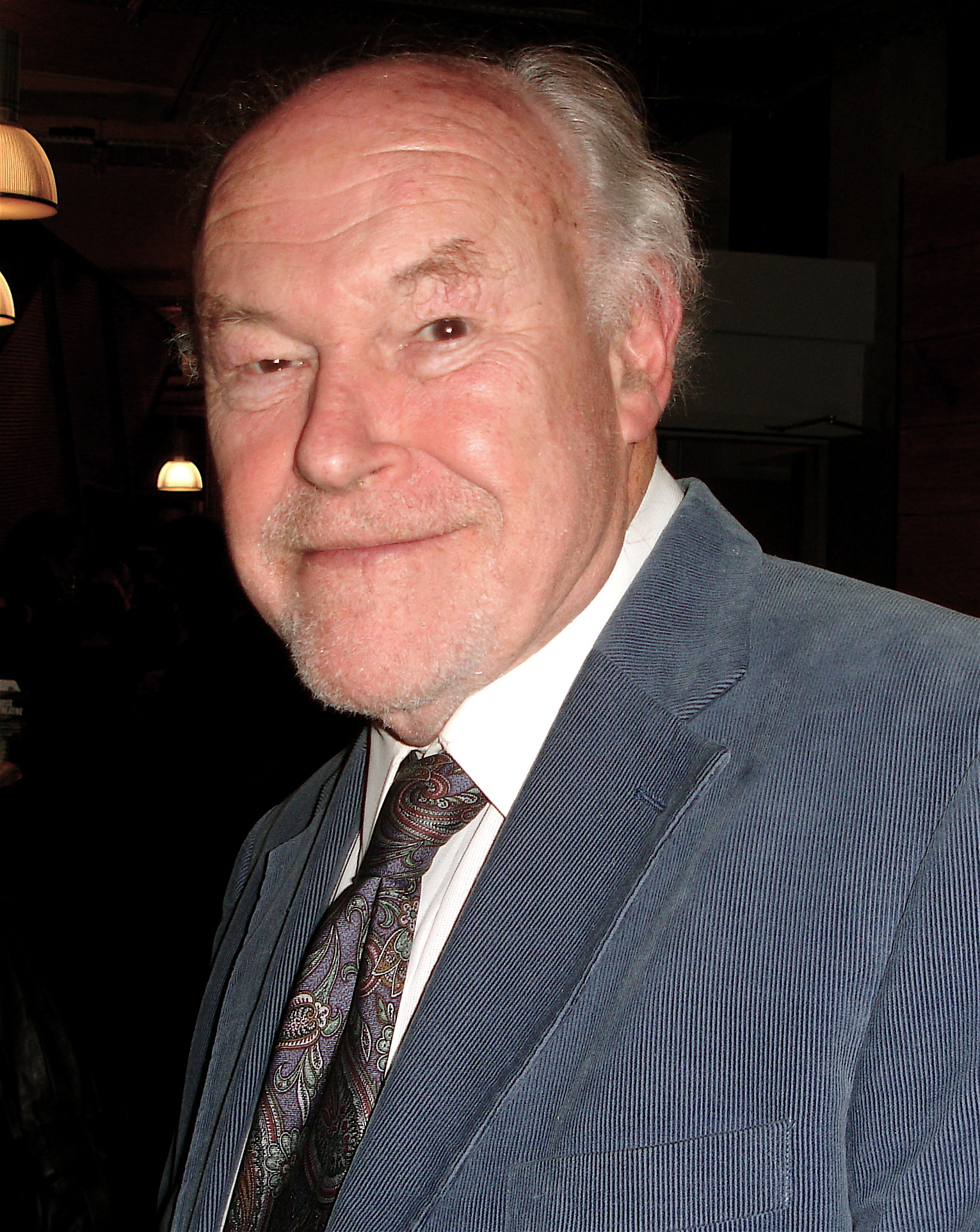
Timothy West in 2010

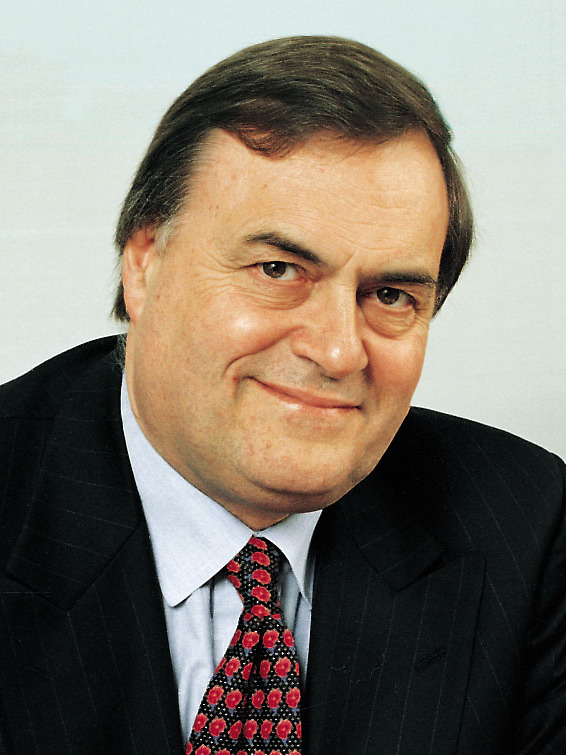
John Prescott in 1997

- 1 November – Michael Ruse, 84, British-born Canadian historian and philosopher.
- 2 November
  - Janey Godley, 63, Scottish stand-up comedian, writer and actress.
  - Paul Stephenson, 87, British civil rights campaigner.
- 3 November – Paul Engelen, 75, British make-up artist (Mary Shelley's Frankenstein, Star Wars: Episode I – The Phantom Menace, Gladiator).
- 4 November
  - Sir Christopher Drewry, 77, British military officer, commander of ARRC (2000–2002).
  - Robin Renwick, Baron Renwick of Clifton, 86, British diplomat and life peer, ambassador to the United States (1991–1995).
- 5 November – Sir Henry Keswick, 86, British businessman (Jardine Matheson).
- 6 November
  - John Cannan, 70, British convicted murderer and rapist.
  - John Dempsey, 78, English-born Irish footballer (Chelsea, Fulham, national team).
  - Anna Lo, 74, Northern Irish politician, MLA (2007–2016).
  - Sir John Nott, 92, British politician, MP (1966–1983) and defence secretary (1981–1983).
- 7 November – James Rawson, 59, British table tennis player, Paralympic champion (1992). (death announced on this date)
- 8 November
  - Trevor Sorbie, 75, British celebrity hairdresser.
  - June Spencer, 105, English actress, (The Archers)
- 10 November – Derrick Grant, 86, Scottish rugby union player (Hawick, national team).
- 11 November
  - Frank Auerbach, 93, German-born British painter.
  - William Radice, 73, British poet, writer, and translator.
- 12 November
  - Barrie Gavin, 89, British film and television director.
  - Timothy West, 90, English actor, (Hedda, King Richard II, EastEnders, The Day of the Jackal) and television presenter (Great Canal Journeys).
- 13 November – Brian Maxine, 86, English wrestler and cabaret artist.
- 14 November
  - Dennis Bryon, 75, Welsh drummer (Amen Corner, Bee Gees).
  - Keith Hepworth, 82, English rugby league player (Castleford, Leeds, Hull F.C.) and coach. (death announced on this date)
  - Peter Sinfield, 80, English lyricist ("21st Century Schizoid Man", "I Believe in Father Christmas"), musician (King Crimson), and record producer.
- 15 November – Graham Bailey, 104, English footballer (Huddersfield Town, Sheffield United).
- 16 November
  - Peter Cowley, 69, British businessman, cancer.
  - John Hine, 86, British Roman Catholic prelate, auxiliary bishop of Southwark (2001–2016).
  - Howard Hughes, British podcaster, radio presenter and journalist (BBC Radio Berkshire, Capital London). (death announced on this date)
  - Frank Robson, 78, English-born Finnish singer.
- 18 November – J. Saul Kane, 55, English DJ and musician. (death announced on this date)
- 20 November
  - John Prescott, Baron Prescott, 86, British politician, deputy prime minister (1997–2007), first secretary of state (2001–2007), and MP (1970–2010).
  - Ken Reid, 69, Northern Irish journalist and political editor (UTV). (death announced on this date)
- 21 November
  - Ken McCulloch, 76, British hotelier, founder of the Malmaison and Dakota hotel chains. (death announced on this date)
  - Laura Samuel, 48, British violinist.
  - Ray Smith, 90, English footballer (Hull City, Peterborough United, Northampton Town).
- 22 November – Kenny Aird, 77, Scottish footballer (St Mirren, St Johnstone, Heart of Midlothian).
- 24 November –
  - Barbara Taylor Bradford, 91, British-American novelist (A Woman of Substance, Hold the Dream).
  - Colin Renfrew, 87, British archaeologist.
- 25 November – John Tinniswood, 112, English supercentenarian, world's oldest man (since 2024).
- 26 November
  - Paul Dickenson, 74, English Olympic hammer thrower (1976, 1980) and sports commentator.
  - Idris Niblett, 93, footballer (Hereford United, Barry Town).
- 27 November – Brian Jackson, 91, English cricketer (Derbyshire). (death announced on this date)
- 28 November – John McNamee, 83, Scottish footballer (Newcastle United, Hibernian, Blackburn Rovers). (death announced on this date)

== December ==
- 1 December
  - Sir Richard Carew Pole, 13th Baronet, 85, British aristocrat.
  - Terry Griffiths, 77, Welsh professional snooker player, world champion (1979).
  - Samantha Lawrence, 55, British hip-hop artist (Wee Papa Girl Rappers).
- 2 December – Rosalie Wilkins, Baroness Wilkins, 78, British politician, member of the House of Lords (1999–2015). (death announced on this date)
- 4 December
  - John Docherty, 84, Scottish football player (Brentford) and manager (Millwall, Cambridge United). (death announced on this date)
  - Tony Young, 71, English footballer (Manchester United, Charlton Athletic, York City). (death announced on this date)
- 6 December – Malcolm Le Grice, 84, British artist and filmmaker. (death announced on this date)
- 8 December – Tony Lloyd, Baron Lloyd of Berwick, 95, British jurist, lord of appeal in ordinary (1993–1998), member of the House of Lords (1993–2015).
- 9 December
  - Will Arnott, 25, Paralympic boccia player (2024).
  - Arnold Yarrow, 104, British actor (Doctor Who, EastEnders), screenwriter and novelist.
- 10 December – Lennie De Ice, 54, British musician ("We Are I.E."). (death announced on this date)
- 11 December
  - Alex Edwards, 78, Scottish footballer (Dunfermline Athletic, Hibernian).
  - Syd Hynes, 80, English rugby league player and coach (Leeds Rhinos). (death announced on this date)
- 12 December
  - Norman Bodell, 86, English football player (Crewe Alexandra, Rochdale) and manager (Barrow). (death announced on this date)
  - Vic Gomersall, 82, English footballer (Swansea City, Manchester City). (death announced on this date)
  - Duncan Norvelle, 66, English comedian.
  - Tommy Robb, 90, Northern Irish Grand Prix motorcycle racer.
- 15 December
  - Andrew Bennett, 85, British politician, MP (1974–2005).
  - David A. McIntee, 55, British writer.
- 17 December
  - David Brodie, 81, British motor racing driver.
  - Mary Keir, 112, British supercentenarian, oldest person in Wales (since 2021).
- 18 December
  - Tony Bentley, 84, English footballer (Southend United).
  - (In Ireland) Patrick Conolly-Carew, 7th Baron Carew, 86, Irish equestrian and aristocrat, Member of the House of Lords as a hereditary peer (1994–1999).
  - Steve Lewinson, 60, British bass guitarist (Simply Red).
- 19 December – Wincey Willis, 76, English broadcaster (Good Morning Britain, Treasure Hunt)
- 20 December – George Eastham, 88, English footballer (Arsenal, Stoke City, national team).
- 21 December – Jack Bond, 87, British film director (Separation, Anti-Clock, It Couldn't Happen Here).
- 25 December – Britt Allcroft, 81, English writer and creator of (Thomas & Friends)
- 26 December – Geoff Wheel, 73, Welsh rugby player (Mumbles, Swansea, national team).
- 27 December –
  - Mickey Bullock, 78, English footballer (Leyton Orient, Halifax Town, Oxford United). (death announced on this date)
  - Olivia Hussey, 73, actress (Romeo and Juliet, Black Christmas, Jesus of Nazareth).
  - Dame Rosalind Savill, 73, British museum curator.
  - Frank Wilson, 80, Welsh rugby union (Cardiff RFC) and rugby league (St Helens, Salford) footballer.
- 28 December
  - Martyn Brown, 57, British video game director (Alien Breed 3D) and producer (Worms, Body Blows), co-founder of Team17. (death announced on this date)
  - Charlie Wright, 86, Scottish football player (Grimsby Town, Charlton Athletic) and manager (Bolton Wanderers)
- 30 December
  - Paddy Hill, 80, Northern Irish human rights campaigner, wrongfully convicted of the 1974 Birmingham pub bombings.
  - Michael Newberry, 27, English footballer (Víkingur Ólafsvík, Linfield, Cliftonville).
  - Sir Fraser Stoddart, 82, British-American chemist, Nobel Prize laureate (2016). (death announced on this date)
- 31 December – Johnnie Walker, 79, English DJ (Radio Caroline, BBC Radio 1, BBC Radio 2), lung disease.
