= Jack Jennings (veteran) =

English World War II survivor (1919–2024)

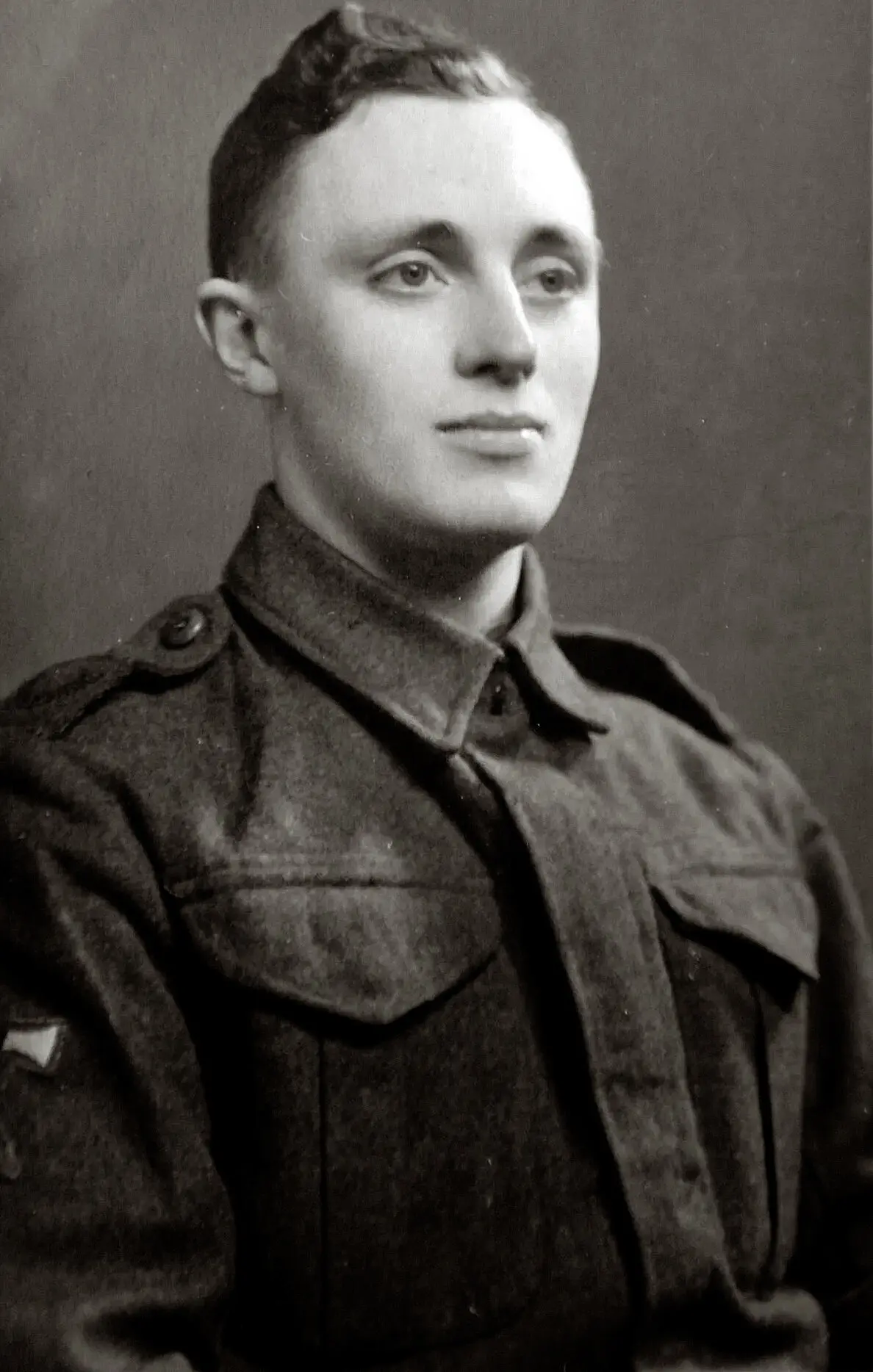
- Jennings, c. 1940
- Born: 10 March 1919; Old Hill, Staffordshire, England
- Died: 19 January 2024 (aged 104); Torquay, Devon, England
- Military career
- Unit: Cambridgeshire Regiment
- Conflicts: World War II

Jack Jennings (10 March 1919 – 19 January 2024) was an English World War II survivor. Jennings was among 60,000 Allied prisoners forced by the Japanese to build a railway between Thailand and Myanmar from 1942 to 1943. Jennings was born in Old Hill, Staffordshire, on 10 March 1919. He died at a care home in Torquay on 19 January 2024, at the age of 104, and was thought to be the last survivor forced to build the Burma Railway.
