= Vikki Richards =

British–Trinidadian actress (1945–2024)

- Born: Viscella Richards; 29 December 1944; Port of Spain, Trinidad
- Died: 6 March 2024 (aged 79); Valsayn, Trinidad and Tobago
- Occupation: Actress

Viscella Richards (29 December 1944 – 6 March 2024), better known as Vikki Richards, was a British and Trinidadian actress.

== Life and career ==
Richards was born on 29 December 1944, in Port of Spain, Trinidad, and as a child moved with her parents to England. There she began her acting career and also did modelling. She played the role of Barbara in the long-running stage production No Sex Please, We're British and appeared in several television shows, including The Onedin Line and Howards' Way, and movies such as Zeta One (1969) and Black Snake (1973).

Richards returned to Trinidad and Tobago in 2004. She worked with the Little Carib Theatre and hosted the home décor television show Living Your Dreams.

Richards held both British and Trinidadian citizenship. She had no children and lived alone in North Valsayn. Richards was found dead at her home on 6 March 2024. She was 79.

== Partial filmography ==
=== Movies ===
- Zeta One (1969) - Angvisa Girl
- Black Snake (1973) - Cleone
- Percy's Progress (1974) - Dolores
- Ghost in the Noonday Sun (1974) - Arab Girl

=== Television ===
- Marty (1968–69) (2 episodes) - Various Characters
- Playhouse (1970) (1 episode) - Jackie White
- Up Pompeii! (1970) (1 episode) - Washroom Attendant
- The Onedin Line (1974) (1 episode) - Alice
- Crown Court (1976) (3 episodes) - Tania Adams
- BBC2 Playhouse (1976) (1 episode) - Gloria
- The Fosters (1977) (1 episode) - Marlene
- The Gentle Touch (1980) (1 episode) - Georgia
- Howards' Way (1985) (1 episode) - Honey Gardiner
- Mind Your Language (1985) (1 episode) - The Newsreader
