= Ultra-Sonic =

Scottish musical group

- Origin: Ayrshire, Scotland
- Genres: Hardcore techno
- Years active: 1991–1998, 2002–2010
- Members: Rodger Hughes; Mallorca Lee; Heather Allan

Ultra-Sonic was a Scottish electronic music band.

== Discography ==
=== Studio albums ===
List of albums, with selected details and chart positions
Title	Details	Peak chart positions	
Title	Details	UK	AUS
Tekno Junkies '92–'94	Released: 1994; Label: Clubscene	89	76
Global Tekno	Released: 1995; Label: Clubscene	58	81
The Hour of Chaos	Released: 1998; Label: Ultra-Sonic Research	—	—
Annihilating Rhythms	Released: 2005; Label: Rumour	—	—
Hardcore Will Never Die	Released: 2020; Label: Ultra-Sonic Research	—	—
Ultra-Frequency	Released: 2022; Label: Ultra-Sonic & Dream-Frequency Research	85	—
