= Kenneth Standring =

English cricketer (1935–2024)

Kenneth Brooks Standring (17 February 1935 – July 2024) was an English cricketer active from 1954 to 1962 who played for Lancashire. He was born in Clitheroe. He appeared in 13 first-class matches as a lefthanded batsman who bowled right arm fast. He scored 255 runs with a highest score of 41 and held two catches. He took 25 wickets with a best analysis of four for 61. Standring died in July 2024, at the age of 89.
