= Charmian Abrahams =

English actress (1927–2024)

- Born: Charmian Blanche Abrahams; 22 February 1927; Birmingham, England
- Died: 15 January 2024 (aged 96); Birmingham, England
- Other name: Charmian Eyre
- Occupation: Actress
- Known for: Crossroads, BBC Sunday Night Theatre

Charmian Blanche Abrahams (22 February 1927 – 15 January 2024), known professionally as Charmian Eyre, was an English actress. She was best known for playing Mavis Hooper in the British television series Crossroads on ITV. She was born and died in Birmingham, England.

== Life and career ==
Abrahams was born in Birmingham to a doctor and a nurse. As a child, she attended Edgbaston High School for Girls, before moving to London to forge her acting career.

Abrahams was best known for playing regular character Mavis Hooper in the British TV soap opera Crossroads. The series drew in large viewing figures of up to 15 million on ITV from 1964 to 1988. The character was also used alongside Mike Yarwood in his ITV sketch show in 1983 where he played Sid and Mavis as well as several other motel regulars from the soap.

Abrahams made her film debut in 1949 and later several television appearances including in ITC's Sword of Freedom, ATV's medical saga Emergency Ward 10, Thames Television's Armchair Theatre and the BBC's Maigret. She also appeared in other television shows throughout her 50-year career, such as the adaptation of Precious Bane, Musical Playhouse, ITV Play Of The Week, Corridors of Blood and BBC Sunday Night Theatre. She toured with stage companies around Northern Europe and Australia and New Zealand. She retired from acting in the 1990s.

== Death ==
Abrahams died after being hit by a delivery van on 15 January 2024, in Birmingham. She was 96 years old. Tributes were paid across social media by family, fans and colleagues.

== Filmography ==
=== Television and film ===
Year		Role	Notes
1950	BBC Sunday Night Theatre		Television programme
1957	Precious Bane		Film
1959	Musical Playhouse		Film
1981	Crossroads	Mavis Hooper	Long-running soap, recurring role until 1985
