= Zeta One =

1970 British film by Michael Cort

- Italian poster
- Directed by: Michael Cort
- Written by: Michael Cort; Alistair McKenzie
- Produced by: George Maynard; Tony Tenser
- Starring: James Robertson Justice; Charles Hawtrey; Dawn Addams
- Cinematography: Jack Atchelor
- Edited by: Jack T. Knight; Dennis Lanning
- Music by: Johnny Hawksworth
- Production company: Tigon British Film Productions
- Distributed by: Tigon Film Distributors
- Release date: October 1970
- Running time: 86 minutes
- Country: United Kingdom
- Language: English
- Budget: £60,000

Zeta One, also known as The Love Slaves, Alien Women and The Love Factor, is a 1970 British comedy science fiction film directed by Michael Cort and starring James Robertson Justice, Charles Hawtrey and Dawn Addams. It was written by Cort and Alistair McKenzie, based on a comic strip short story in the magazine Zeta, and was produced by George Maynard and Tony Tenser for Tigon Films.

== Plot ==
James Word is a spy for Section 5 who finds a secretary from the section waiting when he returns home. As they play strip poker, he tells her about tailing Major Bourdon, who was conducting an investigation into an all-female secret society from the planet Angvia (an anagram of ‘vagina’). The Angvians are led by Zeta. They regularly abduct other planets' women into their ranks and brainwash them to be Angvian operatives. The Angvians next target is stripper Edwina "Ted" Strain. Section 5 uses Strain to set a trap for the Angvians. After Bourdon's men take several of the Angvian agents prisoner, a final confrontation occurs at his estate.

== Cast ==
- James Robertson Justice as Major Bourdon
- Charles Hawtrey as Swyne
- Robin Hawdon as James Word
- Anna Gaël as Clotho
- Brigitte Skay as Lachesis
- Dawn Addams as Zeta
- Valerie Leon as Atropos
- Lionel Murton as 'W'
- Yutte Stensgaard as Ann Olsen
- Wendy Lingham as Ted (Edwina)
- Rita Webb as clippie
- Carol Hawkins as Zara
- Steve Kirby as sleuth
- Paul Baker as Bourdon's assistant
- Walter Sparrow as stage manager
- Alan Haywood as pilot
- Anna Tunnard as Miss Johnson
- Yolande Del Mar as striptease artiste
- Rose Howlett as fat lady
- Nita Lorraine as Angvia girl
- Vikki Richards as Angvia girl
- Angela Grant as Angvia girl
- Kirsten Betts as Angvia girl

== Production ==
Zeta One was the first film shot at Camden Studios, formerly a wallpaper factory in North London. Art director Christopher Neame designed the film's sets. Location shooting took place around the city.

== Release ==
First screened to journalists in April 1969 to hostile reviews, the film sat on the shelf for 18 months before finally getting a UK release in October 1970, as the supporting feature to Kobi Jaegar's 1969 film Kama Sutra.

It was released in America by Film Ventures International, briefly in 1973 as The Love Slaves and then wider in 1974 under the titles Alien Women and The Love Factor. It was released as a Blu-ray DVD in 2013.

== Critical reception ==
In The Monthly Film Bulletin David McGillivray wrote: "The picture-stories for adults in the ill-fated magazine Zeta were an imaginative experiment, but this adaptation of one of them blunts its satire and magnifies its quite preposterous illogicality and silliness. In fact, the treatment would render the film suitable only for Saturday morning audiences were it not for the glut of stark and near-naked girls that cavort incessantly through the hurriedly improvised settings. It is difficult to understand how James Robertson Justice and Dawn Addams came to be involved in such a project unless they were unaware of the banal treatment in store for the script."

Kine Weekly wrote: "This is a light skit on special agents and science fiction that should please the undemanding. ... The plot is introduced very slowly with a lot of talk, but improves once it gets going in the fantastic world of the Angvians, who, judging by their costumes, enjoy perfect central heating. Probability is a scarcity in the story: the touches of humour are obvious but amusing and some of the sequences are more than a little silly; but, generally speaking, it is fairly entertaining nonsense on a small scale. Robin Hawdon is a bland James Word; James Robertson Justice gives his usual, large performance as the wicked Col. Bourdon, and the main Angyian seductions are represented by Anna Gael and Yutte Stensgaard, with guest star Dawn Addams appearing as the Angvian queen bee."

In British Science Fiction Cinema Steve Chibnall called the film "a bizarre psychedelic concoction of sexploitation and feminist fable and a high-point of British cinema's flirtation with weirdness in the late 1960s," adding: "A critical and commercial failure on its release, Zeta One is easy to dismiss as a piece of crazed nonsense, but its significance lies in its eroticisation of collective feminist ambitions and its joyful welcome of a sexually rapacious matriarchy."

Moria Reviews noted it is an odd mix of the James Bond type movies with a sex comedy.
