= Hella Pick =

British-Austrian journalist (1929–2024)

Hella Pick CBE
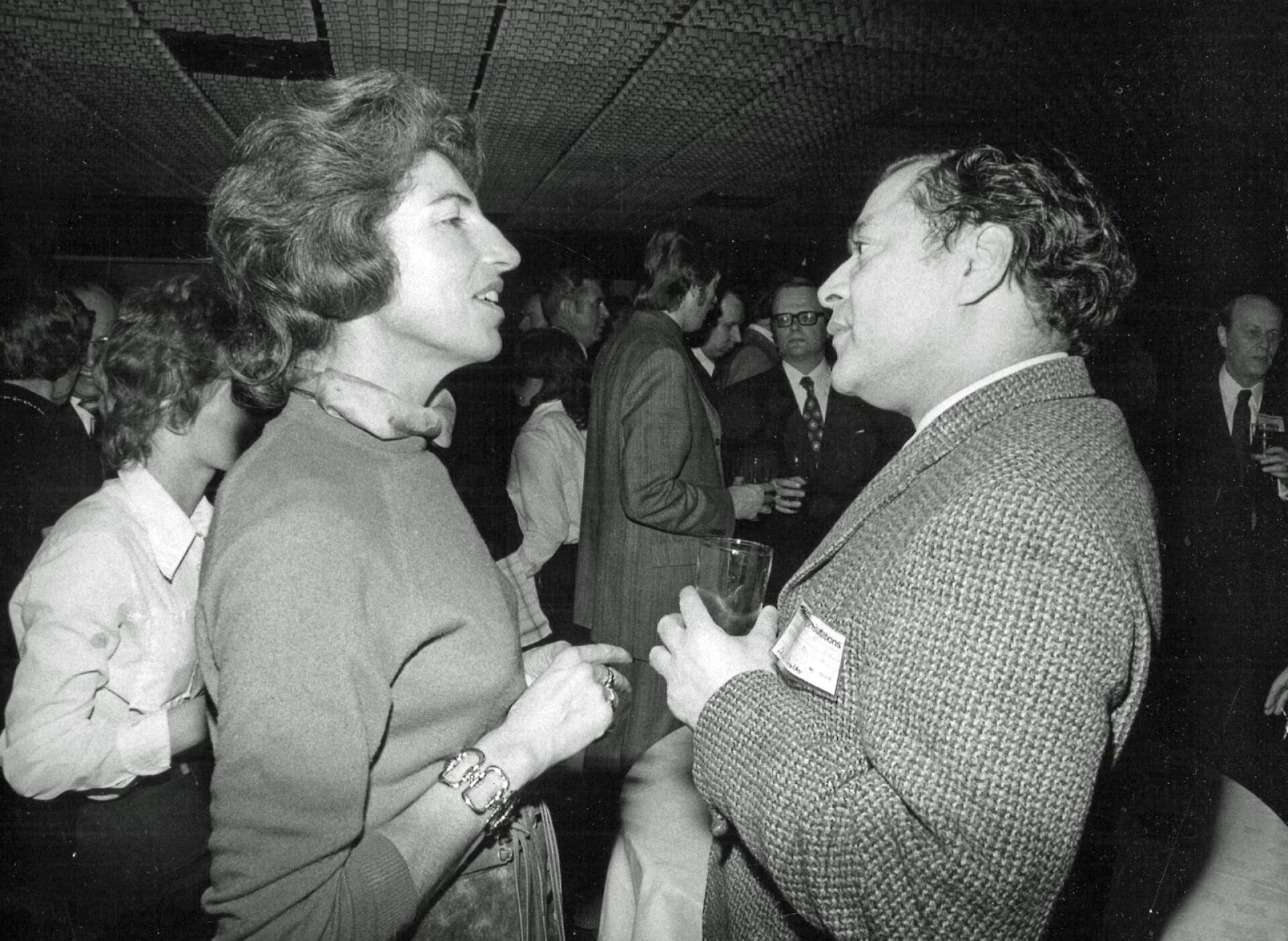
- Pick in 1972, with journalist Moshe Ali
- Born: Hella Henrietta Pick; 24 April 1929; Vienna, Austria
- Died: 4 April 2024 (aged 94); London, England
- Occupation: Journalist

Hella Henrietta Pick CBE (24 April 1929 – 4 April 2024) was an Austrian-born British journalist.

== Biography ==
Hella Pick was born in Vienna, Austria, into a middle-class Jewish family. Her parents divorced when she was three years old and she was brought up by her mother. Following Germany's annexation of Austria in 1938, and a visit from the Gestapo, Pick's mother decided to leave Austria. Pick was put on a Kindertransport and arrived in Britain in March 1939. Her mother obtained a visa and joined her three months later.

Pick attended school in the Lake District and learned English. Feeling awkward about her identity, for a while she refused to speak German at all, even with her mother. In 1948, Pick became a British citizen and she no longer felt herself to be a refugee.

Pick studied at the London School of Economics. She applied for a job at the United Nations, but was not accepted. In 1960, she became the UN correspondent of The Guardian newspaper, where she was tutored by its chief US correspondent Alistair Cooke. At the time there were very few women correspondents, and women were disadvantaged and not treated as equals; for example, at ambassadorial dinners the women withdrew after the meal as was long the custom in the English-speaking world, while the men—including Pick's colleagues and competitors—discussed events over port and cigars. She also wrote for the New Statesman. She was honoured with a CBE in 2000 for her work as a journalist and writer. In Germany she became known for her appearance on the TV shows Internationales Frühschoppen and Presseclub.

Pick was the Arts & Culture Programme Director at the Institute for Strategic Dialogue, an independent think-tank based in London. She had dual British and Austrian citizenship, and regularly visited Austria, her "home away from home".

The Guardian News & Media Archive contains an oral history of her time on the paper in the 1960s and 1970s and a written memoir. Invisible Walls, an account of her life and career in journalism, was published in 2021.

Pick died in London on 4 April 2024, at the age of 94.

== Bibliography ==
- Simon Wiesenthal: A Life in Search of Justice, Weidenfeld & Nicolson, 1996
- Guilty Victim – Austria from the Holocaust to Haider, I B Tauris & Co Ltd, 2000
- Invisible Walls, Weidenfeld & Nicolson, 2021
