= Camilla Mary Carr =

British aid worker (1958–2024)

Camilla Carr
- Born: 31 January 1958
- Died: 22 August 2024 (aged 66)
- Education: Homerton College, Cambridge
- Occupation: Aid worker

Camilla Mary Carr (31 January 1958 – 22 August 2024) was a British humanitarian worker.

== Biography ==
Carr was a former psychologist. She attended Shrewsbury High School and Homerton College, Cambridge.

In 1997, Carr travelled to Chechnya with her partner Jon James to set up a rehabilitation centre for children traumatised by the first Chechen War. She and James were kidnapped and held hostage for 14 months by Chechnyan rebels. There they suffered torture and sexual violence. BBC News reported that she had been the "world's longest-held female hostage". The pair appeared in hostage videos. Their families appealed to Tony Blair for help securing their freedom. On 20 September 1998, Carr and James were set free and returned to Britain.

Carr was involved in The Forgiveness Project which promotes conflict resolution. A practising Christian, she learned to forgive her attackers.

Carr was from Bath, Somerset and had one son. She lived in Bethesda, Gwynedd.
