= David Capper =

Irish journalist and correspondent (1932–2024)

- Born: David Houston Capper; 19 November 1932; Belfast, Northern Ireland
- Died: 23 March 2024 (aged 91); Bangor, County Down, Northern Ireland
- Occupation(s): Journalist, correspondent
- Years active: 1950s–before 2001
- Employer(s): BBC Northern Ireland (1961–1987)
- Children: 3

David Houston Capper (19 November 1932 – 23 March 2024) was a Northern Irish journalist and correspondent.

== Early life and career ==
Born in Belfast on 19 November 1932, Capper started his career at the Newtownards Chronicle. He spent a few years working in Vancouver. Capper later returned to Northern Ireland and worked as an editor at a local newspaper, before joining the Belfast Telegraph and the BBC. Capper left BBC after 26 years, in 1987. He continued to work in media advising developing radio stations abroad, before eventually settling in Donaghadee. Capper had retired by 2001. He last appeared on BBC in July 2019 as a guest in a podcast with Walter Love.

== Personal life and death ==
Capper had three children and nine grandchildren. Capper died in a care center in Bangor, County Down on 23 March 2024, aged 91.
