= Angela Redgrave =

British dance teacher (1917–2024)

- Born: 1917; Finchley, London
- Died: 13 April 2024 (aged 106)
- Occupation: dance teacher

Grace Angela Redgrave BEM (1917 – 13 April 2024) was a British dance teacher who was the founder of the Bristol School of Dancing

== Biography ==
Redgrave was born in Finchley, London in 1917. She grew up in Watford before moving to Somerset after the Second World War where she restarted her teacher training. She was trained as a dancer by the Royal Academy of Dancing Syllabus. She eventually opened her own dance school where she taught thousands of young people. She was the principal of the Bristol School of Dancing for over fifty years. During the COVID-19 pandemic, she and her daughter organised virtual dance lessons.

In 2022, she was awarded a British Empire Medal. At 104, she was the oldest recipient at the Platinum Jubilee Civic Honours. She was also awarded a Lifetime Achievement Award by the Royal Academy of Dance.

In 2024, she died at the age of 106.
