= TSS Duke of York (1935) =

British steamer passenger ship

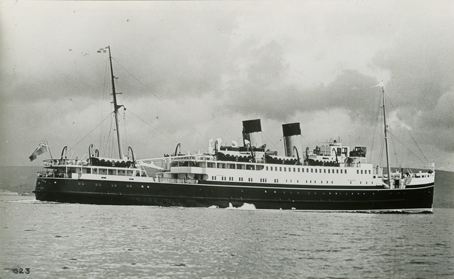

History

United Kingdom
- Name: Duke of York 1935–1942; HMS Duke of Wellington 1942–1948; Duke of York 1948 – 1963; York 1963; Fantasia 1963 – 1975
- Owner: 1935–1948: London Midland and Scottish Railway; 1948–1964: British Transport Commission; 1964–1975: Chandris Lines
- Operator: 1935–1948: London Midland and Scottish Railway; 1948–1964: British Transport Commission; 1964–1975: Chandris Lines
- Port of registry: Lancaster, United Kingdom
- Route: 1935–1939: Heysham – Belfast; 1952–1964: Harwich – Hook of Holland
- Builder: Harland & Wolff, Belfast
- Yard number: 951
- Launched: 7 March 1935
- Completed: 4 June 1936
- Out of service: 1975
- Identification: Official number: 128318
- Fate: Sold 1963, scrapped 1975

General characteristics
- Type: Turbine steam ship
- Tonnage: 3,743 GRT
- Length: 339.2 ft (103.4 m)
- Beam: 55.2 ft (16.8 m)
- Draught: 17.9 ft (5.5 m)
- Installed power: 502 nhp
- Propulsion: Twin screw
- Speed: 12 knots (22 km/h; 14 mph)

Duke of York was a steamer passenger ship initially operated by the London Midland and Scottish Railway which saw service from 1935 to 1964. She was renamed HMS Duke of Wellington for the duration of World War II.

== In service ==
Built by Harland & Wolff in Belfast and completed in 1935, she was designed to operate as a passenger ferry on the Heysham to Belfast, alongside the existing 1928 ships on that route, RMS Duke of Lancaster, RMS Duke of Rothesay and RMS Duke of Argyll. She introduced a new principle into the cross-channel trade, the "tourist class", which had been in use on the Atlantic lines since 1928.

The Duke of York was equipped with one of the earliest automatic fire extinguishers, by Grinnell. Small glass tubes contained a liquid which expanded on a given temperature being reached, and burst the containers, opening water valves above.

== HMS Duke of Wellington ==
Duke of York was requisitioned in 1942 for war service. She was renamed as HMS Duke of Wellington as there was a battleship "HMS Duke of York". She was converted to a "Landing Ship, Infantry (Hand-Hoisting)", LSI(H); the latter part referred to her hand-operated davits. The conversions allowed her to carry 250 troops and ten Landing Craft Assault to carry them to shore. She also received a 12-pounder gun and eight 20 mm anti-aircraft cannons.

She took part in Operation Jubilee, the raid on Dieppe, on 19 August 1942, carrying The Black Watch (Royal Highland Regiment) of Canada. She took part in the Normandy landings in 1944. At the end of the war, she transported troops between Tilbury and Ostend.

== Post-World War II ==
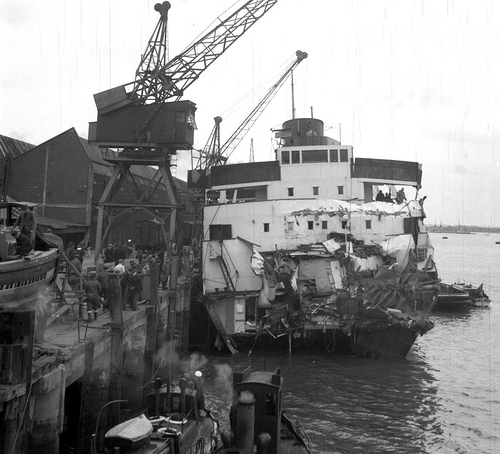
Ship on 31 May 1953 after the collision with American freighter USNS Haiti Victory

She reverted to her original name after the war, and in May 1948 she was transferred to the Harwich to Hook of Holland service, alongside Arnhem. Originally a twin-funnel vessel, she was rebuilt in 1950 with a single funnel. She was upgraded from coal to oil firing and received cabin accommodation for 520 passengers.

On 6 May 1953, she collided in fog with the American freighter USNS Haiti Victory. Six passengers were killed and the bow was completely sheared off just in front of the bridge. The ship's bosun, William Albert Warner, was subsequently awarded the Order of Industrial Heroism for rescuing three people after the collision. Palmers Shipbuilding & Iron Company of Jarrow completely rebuilt her with a more modern-shaped bow, and they lengthened her by about 7 feet (2.1 m). She rejoined the Harwich fleet in 1954.

After performing her last voyage from Hook of Holland on 20 July 1963, Duke of York was sold in August 1963.

== Fantasia ==
Duke of York was sold to Chandris Lines in 1963 and renamed York, she was sent to Smiths Dock Company for conversion work which was completed after transfer to the Chandris Company's own shipyard at Ambelaki. She entered service in 1964 as Fantasia. She ran mainly on cruises in the Eastern Mediterranean, with some winter charters to religious tour groups. She was withdrawn in December 1975 and was broken up in 1976 in Spain.
