= Duke of Lancaster (ship) =

A number of ships were named Duke of Lancaster, including:

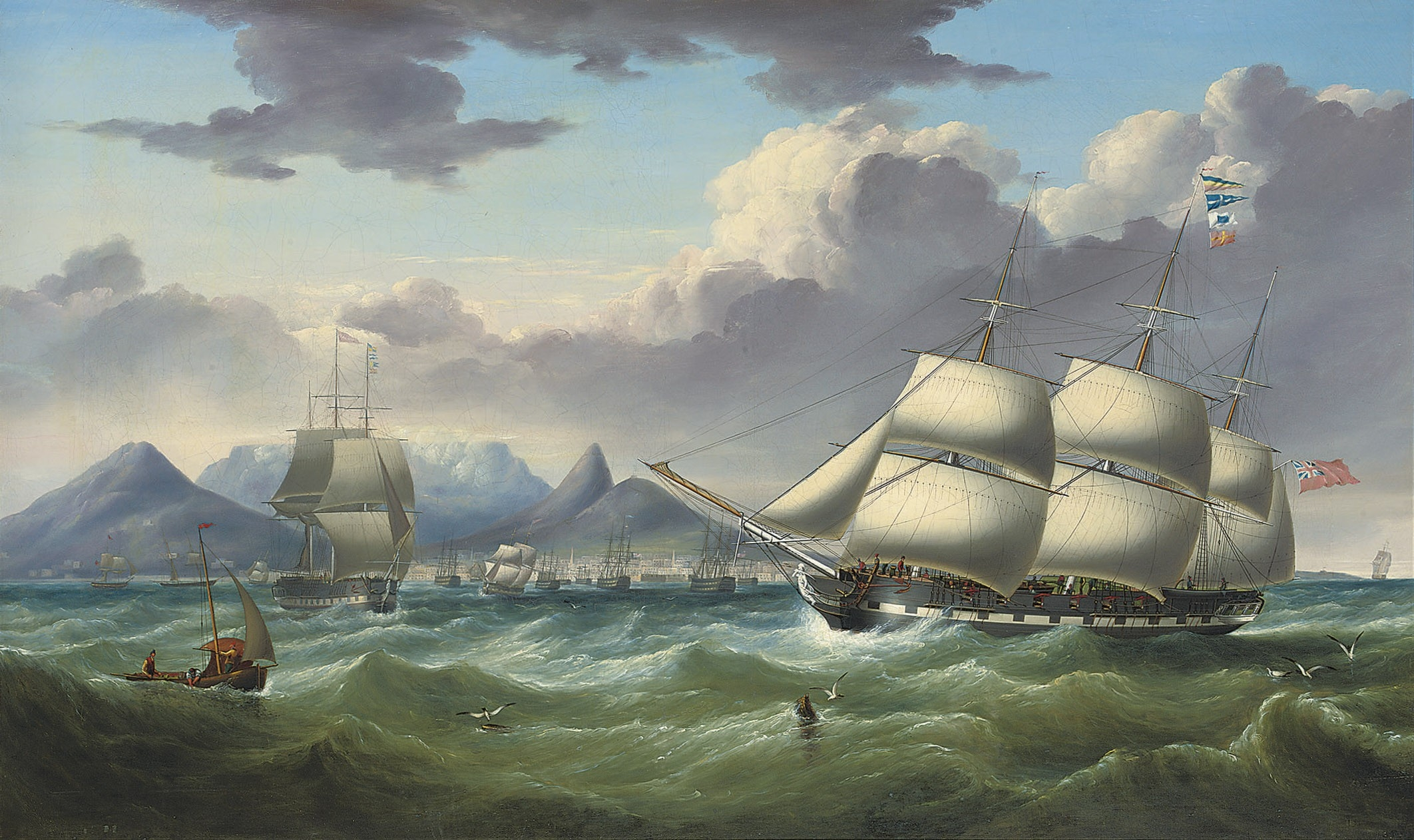
Duke of Lancaster and Royal Saxon off Cape Town, Samuel Waters (artist), c. 1832

- Duke of Lancaster, of 556 tons (bm), was launched at Liverpool for Gladstone & Co. She traded with India under a licence from the British East India Company. She was last listed in 1844.
- SS Duke of Lancaster (1895)
- RMS Duke of Lancaster (1927)
- TSS Duke of Lancaster (1955)
