= TSS Duke of Rothesay =

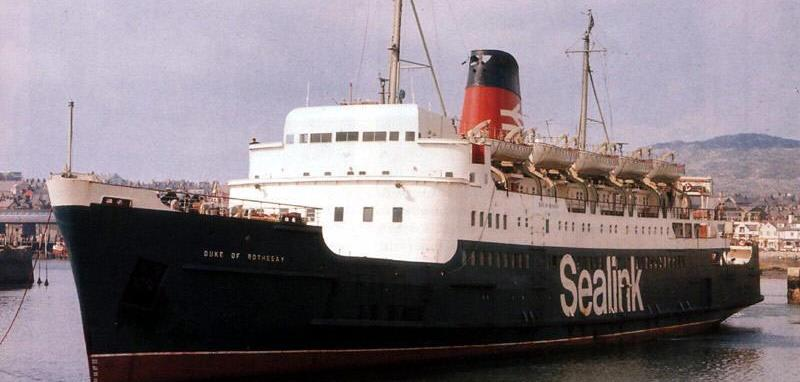
- Duke of Rothesay at Holyhead

History

United Kingdom
- Name: TSS Duke of Rothesay
- Owner: 1956–1963: British Transport Commission; 1963–1975: Sealink
- Operator: 1956–1963: British Transport Commission; 1963–1975: Sealink
- Port of registry: Lancaster, United Kingdom
- Route: 1956–1967: Heysham – Belfast; 1967–1971: Fishguard – Rosslare
- Builder: William Denny & Brothers, Dumbarton
- Launched: 10 February 1956
- Completed: 1956
- Maiden voyage: 1956
- In service: 1956
- Out of service: 1975
- Fate: Scrapped in 1975.

General characteristics
- Type: Turbine steam ship
- Tonnage: 4,797 GT
- Length: 114.63 m (376 ft 1 in)
- Beam: 17.46 m (57 ft 3 in)
- Draught: 4.54 m (14 ft 11 in)
- Installed power: 2 x Parmetrada steam turbines
- Speed: 21 Knots
- Capacity: 1800 passengers

The TSS Duke of Rothesay was a railway steamer passenger ship that operated in Europe from 1956 to 1975. Out of three built, it was the shortest lived of its type.

== In service ==
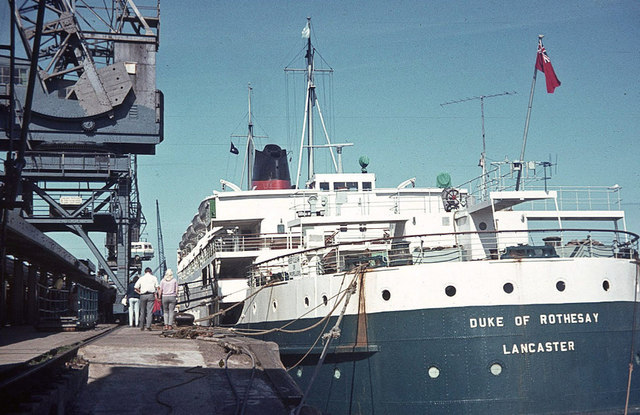
Duke of Rothesay at Fishguard in August 1969.

Along with her sister ships the TSS Duke of Lancaster and the TSS Duke of Argyll she was amongst the last passenger-only steamers built for British Railways (at that time, also a ferry operator). She was a replacement for the 1928 steamer built by the London Midland & Scottish Railway, RMS Duke of Rothesay.

Built at William Denny & Brothers, Dumbarton and completed in 1956, she was designed to operate as both a passenger ferry (primarily on the Heysham-Belfast route) and as a cruise ship.

She provided some relief services between Holyhead and Dún Laoghaire in 1965 and 1966. In March 1967, she was converted to a side loading car ferry by Cammell Laird to be used on the Fishguard to Rosslare service, which continued until the Caledonian Princess took over in 1971. The main deck was gutted and space made for 100 cars.

In October 1975, she was towed from Holyhead to Faslane and scrapped subsequently.

== See also ==
- TSS Duke of Argyll, longest serving ship and most modified of its type
- TSS Duke of Lancaster (1956), last surviving example
