= The Gambling Man =

1995 British TV series

- Genre: Period drama
- Based on: The Gambling Man by Catherine Cookson
- Screenplay by: Trevor Bowen
- Starring: Robson Green; Sylvestra Le Touzel; Stephanie Putson
- Music by: David Ferguson
- Country of origin: United Kingdom
- Original language: English
- No. of series: 1
- No. of episodes: 3

Production
- Running time: 150 minutes (three episodes of 50 minutes)
- Production company: Tyne Tees Television

Original release
- Network: ITV
- Release: 26 February – 12 March 1995

The Gambling Man is a British three-part television serial, or long TV movie, first broadcast in 1995, starring Robson Green, directed by Norman Stone, based on a novel by Catherine Cookson.

== Outline ==
Rory Connor (Robson Green) is a rent-collector on Tyneside with a passion for playing poker for high stakes, while Janie Waggett (Stephanie Putson) is the woman who loves him, standing by him through many troubles. Charlotte Kean (Sylvestra Le Touzel) is Connor's employer, and she too finds him attractive. He gets into bad company in the dark world of gambling, and is so sure that poker is his way to riches that he makes a terrible decision.

The plot may be partly autobiographical, as Catherine Cookson’s own father was a bigamist and a gambler.

== Production ==
Producer Ray Marshall bought the film rights to several of the period works of Catherine Cookson, beginning in 1989 with The Fifteen Streets, which had been turned into a successful stage play. These productions, made by Tyne Tees Television, were very popular and drew between ten and fourteen million viewers each. This is also the series where Dave Myers and Si King, later the Hairy Bikers, met and became friends while working as makeup artist and assistant director respectively.

== Cast ==
- Robson Green as Rory Connor
- Stephanie Putson as Janie Waggett
- Ian Cullen as Paddy Connor
- David Nellist as Jimmy Connor
- Sylvestra Le Touzel as Charlotte Kean
- Bernard Hill as Frank Nickle
- Sammy Johnson as Victor Pittie
- David Haddow as John George Armstrong
- John Middleton as Mr Buckham
- Frank Mills as Mr Kean
- Ron Donachie as Alec McLean
- Peter Marshall as Chief Constable
- Alan Mason as Mr Dryden
- Richard Franklin as Gambler
- T. R. Bowen as Mr Arden
- Jean Southern as Mrs Tyler
- Paul Colman as Gambler
- Max Smith as Bill Waggett
- Anne Kent as Lizzie O'Dowd
- Dennis Lingard as Little Joe
- Allen Mechen as Dan Pittie
- Ron Senior Jr. as Sam Pittie
- Amber Styles as Ruth Connor
- Margery Bone as Maggie Ridley
- Lyn Douglas as Grannie Waggett
- Sarah Finch as Mrs Buckham
- Joe Ging as Dr Munday
- Johnny Caesar as Mr Grable
- Jan Gordon as Woman at Wedding
- Tony Hodge as Oakshott
- Jim Killeen as Man at Gaming House
- Anissa Ladjemi as Widow's Child
- George Lavella as Look-Out Boy
- Peter Marriner as Police Sergeant
- Nick Nancarrow as Nipper
- Bryan St. John as Older Policeman
- Simon Peacock as crying child
