= TSS Duke of Argyll =

A number of ships were named Duke of Argyll, including:

- TSS Duke of Argyll (1909)
- RMS Duke of Argyll (1928), Irish Sea ferry
- TSS Duke of Argyll (1956)

== See also ==
- Duke of Argyll
