= Pedr James =

British television director

Pedr James is a British television director. His career in the industry began in the 1970s, and in the 1980s he worked on highly rated series such as the Channel 4 soap opera Brookside and ITV's short-lived series Tales of Sherwood Forest in 1989. In the 1990s he moved into directing more prestigious drama serials, such as the 1994 BBC adaptation of the Charles Dickens novel Martin Chuzzlewit. He was also one of the directors of the BBC's award-winning drama serial Our Friends in the North in 1996. Subsequently, he left directing to become the Head of Drama at BBC Cymru Wales, a position he filled from 1997 to 2000.

Media offices
Preceded by Karl Francis	BBC Wales Head of Drama; 1997–2000	Succeeded by Matthew Robinson
