= KIWIE =

Pseudonymous Latvian street artist

KIWIE is a pseudonymous Latvian street artist who has based his artistic style on a multiform repetition of one specific image – KIWIE monster character. He has been active since 2006.

== Career and exhibitions ==
=== Exhibitions ===
KIWIE has participated in graffiti and street art festivals around the world, taken part in group shows as well as organised solo exhibitions. In 2007, KIWIE's art was performed and displayed in the exhibition hall Arsenāls in Riga during an exhibition of contemporary art “Candy Bomber” (“Našķu bumba”) alongside other street artists. In 2009, the exhibition Beneath took place at Riga Art Space in which KIWIE, AMC and SAKI performed and displayed their street art.

In 2011 on April Fools KIWIE's art was displayed as a part of “Wood Morning”, an exhibition showcasing different uses of wood-based materials in art. In 2012, an interactive art exhibition “Steal Me!” where participants were encouraged to follow directions and “steal” KIWIE's works took place in Riga. The project “Gray Rainbow” was created in 2013. It was the first large-scale mural graffiti painting in Latvia and biggest street artwork in the country. The mural was part of the KIWIE Solo Exhibition sequence that was held in 5 different countries at the same time - Latvia, Estonia, Poland, Germany, and France. In 2014, KIWIE's street art exhibition “Street Noise” was displayed during an electronic music festival “Urban Soulz” in an abandoned Soviet building in Riga. In 2016, one of the artist's solo shows “MIMIK” took place at “Riga Art Space” and gathered a record number of visitors at the opening night. In 2019, KIWIE participated in the 28 STARS EXHIBITION in Amsterdam curated by the Amsterdam Street Art Association.

=== Graffiti festivals ===
KIWIE's street art has appeared in graffiti festivals in Latvia, Estonia, Poland, Germany, and Cyprus.

- Baltic Graffiti Festival 2006 in Riga, Latvia
- Baltic Graffiti Festival 2007 in Riga, Latvia
- Baltic Session 2013 in Tallinn, Estonia
- Street art festival Blank Canvas, Riga, Latvia
- Street Life Festival in 2015, Limassol, Cyprus
- Street Life Festival in 2019, Limassol, Cyprus

=== Commissioned works ===
In 2012, the project “The Black Duke of Lancaster” took place in Wales, UK, where KIWIE spray-painted an abandoned cruise liner TSS Duke of Lancaster. In 2014, KIWIE executed the biggest graffiti mural in the Baltic States. Titled “Saule, Pērkons, Daugava”, the works can be found in one of the streets of Riga, and it covers approximately 800 m^{2} of the wall surface. This work was created during a street art festival, and KIWIE did it together with the street artist Rudens Stencil. In 2021, the artist started a new series of blockchain-enabled art installations in 1001 locations across the world.

=== Collaborations ===
The artist has collaborated with companies such as skateboarding apparel manufacturer Vans, vegan junk food restaurant Frost Burgers, liquor producer Jägermeister, Latvian art museum Zuzeum and others.

=== Technique ===
KIWIE has a background in graphic, product and fashion design. The artist specializes in street art and colorful canvas paintings, often large scale.
