= Our Friends in the North =

1996 British television drama serial

- Opening title sequence of Our Friends in the North
- Genre: Drama
- Written by: Peter Flannery
- Directed by: Simon Cellan Jones; Pedr James; Stuart Urban
- Starring: Christopher Eccleston; Gina McKee; Daniel Craig; Mark Strong; Peter Vaughan
- Country of origin: United Kingdom
- Original language: English
- No. of series: 1
- No. of episodes: 9 (list of episodes)

Production
- Producer: Charles Pattinson
- Camera setup: Single camera
- Running time: 63–75 minutes

Original release
- Network: BBC2
- Release: 15 January – 11 March 1996

Our Friends in the North is a British television drama serial produced by the BBC. It was originally broadcast in nine episodes on BBC2 in early 1996. Written by Peter Flannery, it tells the story of four friends from Newcastle upon Tyne over a period of 31 years, from 1964 to 1995. The story makes reference to certain political and social events occurred during the depicted era, some specific to Newcastle and others affecting Britain as a whole. These include general elections, police and local government corruption, the UK miners' strike of 1984–1985, and the Great Storm of 1987.

The serial is commonly regarded as one of the most successful BBC television dramas of the 1990s, described by The Daily Telegraph as "a production where all ... worked to serve a writer's vision. We are not likely to look upon its like again". It was awarded three British Academy Television Awards (BAFTAs), two Royal Television Society Awards, four Broadcasting Press Guild Awards, and a Certificate of Merit from the San Francisco International Film Festival.

Our Friends in the North helped to establish the careers of its four lead actors, Daniel Craig, Christopher Eccleston, Gina McKee and Mark Strong. Craig's part in particular has been referred to as his breakthrough role. It was also a controversial production, as its stories were partly based on real people and events. Several years passed before it was adapted from a play, performed by the Royal Shakespeare Company, to a television drama, owing in part to the BBC's fear of legal action.

In February 2022, it was announced that Flannery had rewritten Our Friends in the North for BBC Radio 4 and that it would feature a new, tenth episode written by Adam Usden, set in 2020 Newcastle. It features James Baxter, Norah Lopez Holden, Philip Correia and Luke MacGregor in the respective roles of Nicky, Mary, Tosker and Geordie, and began 17 March 2022.

In October 2026, Our Friends in the North will be adapted for the stage and be performed at Newcastle Theatre Royal, produced by Live Theatre, Eastlake Productions and Newcastle Theatre Royal.

== Plot ==
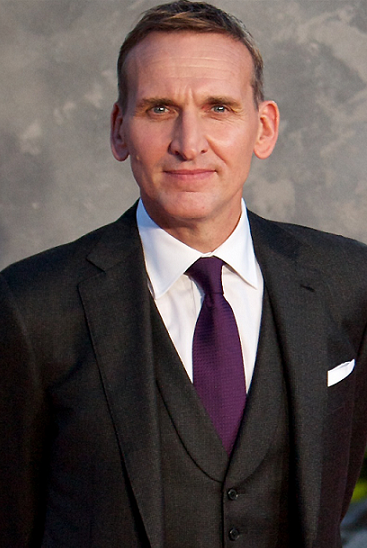
Christopher Eccleston (pictured in 2013) played Dominic 'Nicky' Hutchinson in Our Friends in the North, earning a BAFTA nomination for his performance.

In 1964 twenty-year-old university student Nicky Hutchinson (Christopher Eccleston) returns to Newcastle after volunteering for the summer in the U.S. civil rights movement. His friends Geordie (Daniel Craig) and Tosker (Mark Strong) are eager to start a band but Nicky rebuffs them as he is occupied with campaigning for the Labour Party in the 1964 general election.

Nicky's girlfriend, Mary (Gina McKee), is also unhappy with his lack of attention and they drift apart. Tosker takes advantage of the situation and successfully woos Mary, getting her pregnant. Nicky is offered a job working for Austin Donohue (Alun Armstrong), a former council leader who is starting a PR and lobbying firm.

Nicky is impressed by Austin's apparent passion for change and he drops out of university to accept the job, to the dismay of his working-class father, Felix (Peter Vaughan). Geordie gets into a fight with his abusive, alcoholic father and runs away from home, abandoning his pregnant fiancée.

Now living in London, Geordie accepts a job offer from sleazy crime boss Benny Barratt (Malcolm McDowell) and begins working as his assistant in the Soho sex industry. Meanwhile Mary and Tosker struggle to adapt to their new married life. Their high-rise council flat, despite being brand new, is plagued by structural issues including rampant damp. Nicky is dismayed that Austin's firm is representing John Edwards, the owner of the company responsible for the sub-standard flats. After discovering records of the extensive bribery that took place in the project's development, Nicky resigns in protest. Austin later receives four years in prison for his involvement and Edwards is declared bankrupt. Tosker's dreams of becoming a professional musician rapidly fade after a brutal audition with a local talent scout. Dejected, he continues to do menial jobs to make ends meet. After visiting Geordie in London, he is given a loan from Benny and starts his own grocery business. Around this time, Geordie starts an affair with Benny's girlfriend, Julia.

Working as a photo journalist in London, Nicky's ideologies become extreme to the point he joins an anarchist terrorist cell. While lying low in Newcastle he is confronted by his parents and family friend Eddie Wells (David Bradley) after his mother, Florrie (Freda Dowie), finds a submachinegun in his room. Despite his insistence he is in the right, his anarchist activities are brought to a sudden halt when the cell's hideout is raided by the police and everyone but he is arrested. Later Eddie runs as an independent Labour candidate in a Westminster by-election, after Felix agrees to be his campaign agent. Owing to Nicky's past ties to extremism, Eddie rejects his support, narrowly winning the seat nevertheless. Nicky eventually returns to mainstream politics in Newcastle and becomes a Labour parliamentary candidate himself. However, despite running in a safe Labour constituency and receiving an endorsement from Eddie, he manages to lose the seat to the Conservatives after a smear campaign depicts him as an IRA sympathiser.

In London the situation gets progressively more difficult for Benny's businesses as continued pressure from the Metropolitan Police (Met) Commissioner Colin Blamire (Peter Jeffrey) forces the heavily corrupt vice ("dirty") squad to reluctantly act. Meanwhile, tired of being repeatedly blackmailed by the dirty squad, one of Benny's men takes evidence of Met corruption to the Sunday papers and the resulting scandal forces the government to hold an independent inquiry. Roy Johnson (Tony Haygarth) is brought in from Newcastle as an outsider to run the investigation but is obstructed at every turn by Blamire, dirty squad Commander Harold Chapple (Donald Sumpter) and his henchman John Salway (David Schofield). Despite the setbacks, Johnson is able to present a report to the Home Secretary detailing extensive Met corruption. Blamire, however, is able to leverage a separate investigation into the Home Secretary's past business dealings to blackmail him into suppressing the inquiry findings. A disheartened Johnson returns to Newcastle to take early retirement. With the inquiry behind them, Benny and the dirty squad are free to reach new lucrative arrangements. Benny also has Geordie framed and imprisoned in revenge for the affair with Julia years before. Subsequent police investigations eventually bring down Chapple, Salway and many other corrupt Met officers.

Some years later Tosker is now a moderately successful businessman and Mary is occupied with her advocacy work. After Tosker's repeated infidelity, their marriage breaks down and he moves out to live with his new girlfriend, Elaine (Tracey Wilkinson). Nicky and Mary briefly reunite, but she is hesitant to resume their relationship out of concern for her young children. Out of prison and back living in Newcastle, Geordie is devastated to learn that Julia has been killed in an apparent accident. He aggressively questions Benny over her death but accepts Benny's argument that he had no motive to kill her. Eventually Geordie's casual drug dealing gets him in trouble with the law again and he departs for London a second time.

In 1984 Nicky is covering the ongoing miners' strike. After being injured in a brawl between the police and the miners, he rekindles his relationship with Mary. Tosker meanwhile has made his fortune as a slum landlord, straining his marriage with Elaine. At her urging, he sells the properties and invests heavily in stocks, which are subsequently wiped out in the 1987 market crash. Three years later, Nicky is struggling with his marriage to Mary and also with his father Felix who has been diagnosed with Alzheimer's disease. While in London, he needlessly picks a fight with Eddie Wells and starts an affair with a young student, Alice. He eventually separates from Mary to pursue Alice but by then she is not interested in a serious relationship. Geordie, who is now an alcoholic and living at a homeless shelter, sets fire to his bed in a moment of madness. Quickly apprehended, he is deemed a danger to society and is stunned when the judge sentences him to life in prison. Nicky reconciles with Eddie after he discovers Eddie's assistant is a mole for a PR company. Eddie resigns in embarrassment but as he is leaving Westminster he is caught up in the Great Storm of 1987 and dies of a heart attack. The storm also presents Geordie an opportunity to escape his prison transport but he chooses not to take it. In Newcastle, Mary initially refuses to run in the by-election for Eddie's seat but eventually changes her mind and is subsequently elected. Exasperated at Felix's increasingly outlandish behaviour, Florrie can no longer cope and she sends him to a care home.

Seven years later in 1995, Nicky has been living in Italy and returns to Newcastle to attend Florrie's funeral. Tosker and Elaine have slowly rebuilt their business and are on the eve of opening a new floating nightclub. Geordie has escaped from prison and approaches the club looking for work, where he is recognised by Elaine. Although Tosker and Elaine privately do not believe his story that he is out on parole, they take him in and give him a job playing keyboards for the opening night band. Nicky desperately tries to convince Felix that his life, in particular the Jarrow March, was not a failure, but Felix's mind is too far gone to understand. Geordie tries to attend the club launch event but is refused entry due to a miscommunication with the bouncers. Tosker fills in for the band at the last minute and finally achieves his dream of musical stardom, albeit on a small scale. The four friends reunite at Florrie's funeral for the first time for 31 years. Afterwards Tosker spends time with his grandchildren, Nicky decides to try and patch things up with Mary and Geordie walks off to an unknown fate.

== Cast ==
- Christopher Eccleston as Nicky Hutchinson
- Mark Strong as Terry "Tosker" Cox
- Gina McKee as Mary Cox
- Daniel Craig as Geordie Peacock
- Peter Vaughan as Felix Hutchinson
- Freda Dowie as Florrie Hutchinson
- David Bradley as Eddie Wells
- Tracey Wilkinson as Elaine Cox (née Craig)
- Alun Armstrong as Austin Donohue
- Malcolm McDowell as Benny Barratt
- Donald Sumpter as Harold Chapple
- David Schofield as John Salway
- Peter Jeffrey as Commissioner Colin Blamire
- Tony Haygarth as Roy Johnson
- Stephanie Putson as Bernadette Cox (teenager)
- Emma Lightfoot as Bernadette Cox (young)
- Julian Fellowes as Claud Seabrook
- Danny Webb as Detective Inspector Ron Conrad
- John Dair as Charlie Dawson
- Trevor Cooper as DCS Dennis Cockburn
- Geoffrey Hutchings as John Edwards
- Frank Couchman as Patrick Soulsby
- Elspeth Charlton as Mrs Soulsby
- Jack McBride as Mr Soulsby
- Anne Orwin as Mrs Sandra Weightman
- Daniel Casey as Anthony Cox
- Nick Figgis as Anthony Cox (teenager)
- Saskia Wickham as Claudia Seabrook
- Angeline Ball as Daphne
- Chris Walker as DCI Paul Boyd
- William Hoyland as Commander Arthur Fieldson
- Pete Lee-Wilson as Colin Butler
- Larry Lamb as Alan Roe
- Anna Maria Donofrio as Frances
- Harriet Keevil as Helen Windsor
- Granville Saxton as Commissioner Jellicoe
- Louise Salter as Julia (Jules) Allen
- Siobhan Burke as Lucille
- Paul Greenwood as Ray Bennett
- Charlie Hardwick as Paula Bennett
- Mary Woodvine as Alison
- Colette Brown as Alice MacDonald
- Jean Heywood as woman at the market
- Pearce Quigley as Detective
- Jean Southern as Mrs Rashleigh
- Miriam Stockley as singer
- Libby Davison as Sarah
- Gavin Muir as Father Kyle
- Doreen Mantle as Mrs Wilson
- Sophia Diaz as Mercedes
- Margery Bone as Barbara Cox
- Melvyn Barnes as Sean Collins
- Joanne Macinnes as Francine Volker
- Angela Bruce as Nursing sister
- Harry Herring as Arthur Watson

== Episodes ==
No.	Title	Directed by	Written by	Original release date
1	"1964"	Pedr James	Peter Flannery	15 January 1996
Twenty-year-old Nicky Hutchinson returns to Newcastle in 1964 after several months working in the southern United States, where he participated in the emerging Civil Rights Movement in New Orleans. He visits his girlfriend, Mary Soulsby, who is living with her parents and her disabled brother Patrick. He later has a small birthday gathering with Mary, his parents, Felix and Florrie, best friend George "Geordie" Peacock and local councillor Eddie Wells, a friend of Felix's. After arguing with Felix about his past involving the Jarrow March, Nicky begins to campaign for the Labour Party in the upcoming election, much to the annoyance of Felix. Geordie introduces Mary to his friend Terry "Tosker" Cox, who begins to make romantic overtures towards her despite Nicky's presence. Feeling that Nicky no longer has time for her, Mary eventually accepts Tosker's overtures. Later, he pressures her into sleeping with him, and despite her warnings to "be careful" ejaculates inside her. Geordie, disheartened when Tosker and Nicky make it clear that they are no longer interested in forming a band, leaves Newcastle without warning and hitches down to London to get away from his forthcoming marriage to a girl he has made pregnant and from his drunken, abusive father. He starts working in a café, where he encounters a former police constable, Berger, who claims that the Metropolitan Police is corrupt. He gives Geordie a letter to post to the Commissioner outlining these allegations, and is promptly arrested. Following Labour's victory in the election, Nicky is offered a job by Austin Donohue, Leader of Newcastle City Council, who outlines a series of large building projects he wishes to bring in across the North. Despite protests from Felix that he should return to Manchester University to complete his degree, Nicky accepts Donohue's offer.
2	"1966"	Stuart Urban	Peter Flannery	22 January 1996
Berger has been placed in a mental institution, where he is visited by Chief Inspector Roy Johnson and continues to proclaim that the Met is corrupt. After Johnson tells him that he is not senior enough to start an investigation, Berger hangs himself. Mary has married Tosker and is bringing up their one-year-old son in a newly built high-rise council flat on the Willow Lane Estate, which had been pushed for by Austin Donohue and developer John Edwards. The cafe Geordie worked in has been shut down, leading him to seek work with a Soho porn baron, Benny Barratt. Barratt colludes with the police, and uses Geordie to bribe Detective Chief Inspector John Salway and Commander Harold Chapple. Nicky is still assistant to Donohue, but has grown disillusioned and suspicious of Donohue's deals with Edwards. He is also finding it difficult to remain friends with Mary, whose marriage to Tosker is collapsing under the strain of Tosker's one-night stands and his suspicion of Nicky. Despite this, Mary falls pregnant again. Geordie is introduced to Julia, Benny Barratt's mistress, and falls in love with her. Nicky finally walks out on Donohue, chastising him for failing to fulfil his promises and for accepting bribes from Edwards to build poor quality housing. Nicky takes with him incriminating evidence of Donohue's corrupt dealings with Edwards.
3	"1967"	Simon Cellan Jones, Pedr James, Stuart Urban	Peter Flannery	29 January 1996
Mary and Tosker's marriage continues to fall apart, as does their Willow Lane flat. Geordie has become a confidant of Barratt's, enabling him to live comfortably, and has been pursuing an affair with Julia. Barratt discovers the affair, but remains silent. Nicky, disillusioned with the Labour Party, has turned to the anarchist movement and is in a relationship with a radical, middle-class anarchist. The pair have a disastrous dinner with Mary and Tosker, who find they now have nothing in common with Nicky's attitudes, and find his girlfriend condescending. Wells discovers that Nicky has documents that prove that Donohue and Edwards acted illegally, and asks him to make them public. Nicky refuses and instead leaves for London. Edwards has abandoned Donohue and is expanding his affairs overseas with the help of corrupt Conservative MP Claude Seabrook. Tosker loses his job when the company has to halt illegal exports to Rhodesia because of the UK sanctions. Depressed, he travels to London to visit Geordie, who takes him out in Soho and introduces him to Barratt. The porn baron takes a shine to Tosker, giving him money and ensuring he is entertained. Barratt asks Geordie if he is having an affair with Julia and, rather than lie, Geordie confesses. Barratt states that for being honest, he will continue to employ Geordie, but takes him to see Julia having sex with Salway for money. This leaves Geordie devastated.
4	"1970"	Pedr James, Stuart Urban	Peter Flannery	5 February 1996
Nicky is now living in a London squat with a group of anarchist extremists opposed to the Heath government. Geordie, through his connections with the Met, manages to track Nicky down and takes him for a night out in Soho, but the two men now have little in common. Geordie's position is threatened when a police officer names him as colluding with other officers, and an investigation into corruption is instigated. Johnson, who has been promoted, is asked to lead it, although Salway and Chapple lean on other officers to obstruct it. The anarchists, shaken by Geordie finding them so easily, ask Nicky to leave. Shortly after, they begin attempting minor terrorist attacks on government buildings and the home of a senior police officer. Back in Newcastle, Nicky meets up with Mary and Tosker, who have finally moved out of the Willow Lane flat. Tosker now runs a successful fruit and vegetable business from a van, bought with money given to him by Barratt, and he plans to buy his own shop with a flat above. Mary is pursuing a law degree and has gone into local politics. She and Tosker continue to grow apart. Johnson makes a breakthrough in his investigation, which he discovers leads all the way to Seabrook, who has become Home Secretary. His investigation is later stopped by the Commissioner, Colin Blamire, who fears the embarrassment of media publicity. Blamire promotes Salway, and Johnson's report is returned without being read. In despair, he retires to Newcastle. Geordie leaves London on business for Barratt, staying at a seaside boarding house where he falls in love with a woman. He leaves and promises to go back to her; however upon returning to London he discovers that Barratt has planted incriminating evidence in his flat in revenge for his affair with Julia, and he is arrested by Salway. Nicky's anarchist colleagues, including his girlfriend, are raided and arrested. At the same time, Nicky's family is horrified to discover that he has hidden a submachine gun under his bed. Felix orders him out of his house and he and Wells dispose of the gun by burying it at the allotments. Nicky seeks comfort from Mary while Tosker is doing a delivery. When Tosker returns, he reveals to Mary that her disabled brother Patrick has died. Nicky, Tosker, Mary and their families and friends attend the funeral.
5	"1974"	Pedr James	Peter Flannery	12 February 1996
Under the new leadership of Commissioner Jellicoe, the Met is finally cracking down on the Soho porn industry, as well as their own internal corruption. Chapple announces his intention to retire, hoping to escape discovery. Meanwhile, the police have begun to quietly investigate the activities of Donohue, and interview a now bankrupt Edwards. Edwards gives the police Nicky's name in relation to a missing dossier of Donohue's that they believe would prove incriminating. Nicky has remained in Newcastle, now living in the decrepit high-rise flat that he first found for Tosker and Mary in 1966. He runs a radical magazine alongside his factory job, and is a keen photographer. He has also reconciled with his family, as they together experience the Three-Day Week. Geordie is released and seeks revenge on Barratt, whom he discovers has fled to Spain. He seeks comfort with his former colleague Lucille, who is now living in his old flat, telling her that not one person visited him in prison. Wells asks Felix to be an agent for his campaign to become the local MP at the upcoming election; after losing selection as the Labour candidate to a wealthy businessman, Wells runs as an independent Labour candidate. Nicky offers his support but Wells tells him he does not want his help. During the campaign, Nicky begins to rekindle his relationship with Mary, who has become a councillor, whilst Tosker's business and other interests pull him away from his family. When Geordie hears that Barratt is visiting Soho, he gets a gun in an attempt to murder him. Before he is able to, Barratt is arrested by the police, who procure tapes from him that are instrumental in revealing the corruption and alliance between the police and pornographers. Before either can retire, Salway and Chapple are arrested. Donohue and Edwards are also arrested, the separate investigation having finally proven their criminality. Despite a Labour smear campaign, Wells wins the election by a narrow margin. Geordie returns to Newcastle unaware of the election, and by chance finds Wells's victory party, and meets Nicky, Mary and Tosker; for the first time in a decade, the four friends are reunited.
6	"1979"	Simon Cellan Jones	Peter Flannery	19 February 1996
Tosker and Mary's marriage has disintegrated but, for the sake of their children Anthony and Bernadette, they stay together. Depressed and worried about the loss of his hair, Tosker frequents local nightclubs with Geordie and enjoys one-night stands. Nicky has returned to mainstream politics and wins selection as Labour Party candidate in the constituency next door to Wells, who has also rejoined the Party. His Conservative opponent Claudia Seabrook, daughter of the now disgraced former Home Secretary, is given Colin Butler as agent, and he begins a concerted campaign to smear Nicky. Geordie, now living next door to Nicky, has been selling drugs for corrupt Newcastle policemen. Shortly before his flat is raided, he discovers that Julia has apparently committed suicide and is convinced that Barratt was responsible. He travels to London, leaving his flat empty for a disillusioned Anthony to enter. The police find Anthony in Geordie's flat, drunk and waving a gun around. In London, Geordie confronts Barratt, who is recently out of prison, but Barratt denies having anything to do with Julia's death. The now retired Johnson, who has become a neighbour and friend of Felix, who has been made redundant from his job at Swan Hunter, asks to meet Commissioner Jellicoe to vent his frustration about his ignored report, but is called away to deal with an attack on his allotment. The culprit is Anthony, who having escaped from the police has vandalised the allotment, but on Mary's insistence he later apologises to Johnson, forming a tentative friendship with him. Horrified at the campaign, Claudia sacks Butler. At a disco, Tosker meets Elaine and falls in love with her. He finally asks Mary for a divorce, but cannot bring himself to tell Anthony and Bernadette, who have grown to dislike him. Returning to Newcastle to find his flat raided and the police looking for him, Geordie goes on the run. It is announced that the Willow Lane flats are finally to be demolished. Nicky is unable to find happiness in this long-desired goal being fulfilled as he is certain to lose the election, despite Mary agreeing to help him. Although he and Mary still feel for each other, and even though Tosker is now engaged to Elaine, Mary tells Nicky that she must put her children first and walks away from him.
7	"1984"	Simon Cellan Jones	Peter Flannery	26 February 1996
As the miners' strike dominates political life, Mary has become Deputy Leader of Newcastle City Council and is supporting the miners. Her son Anthony finds himself on the frontline having become a policeman. Nicky, whose career as a photographer has begun to take off, works with Wells to investigate the involvement of local businesses in breaking the strike, at the same time as a now balding Tosker is doing deals with these men. When police from the Met are sent in as reinforcements and some workers try to break the strike and enter the pit, a riot ensues. Anthony is disturbed by the violence, in particular the brutality of the London policemen. With conflicted loyalties, he asks to be taken off policing the strike. When Nicky is injured while taking photos of the riot, Mary tends his wounds, and they sleep together. Mary offers to defend two miners in court, and pressures Anthony to testify on behalf of the miners, knowing that that would swing the verdict. His decision to testify leads to the prosecution reducing the charge against one of the miners. Anthony is told he has destroyed any chances of advancement in the police. Florrie and Felix are frequently harassed by local youths, including young Christopher Collins. When he goes to complain to Collins's family, Felix is attacked by his stepfather and his Rottweiler, and ends up in hospital. Nicky arranges for his mother to move to a bungalow, but the attack has accelerated Felix's deterioration. Tosker, happy with Elaine, has begun to become wealthy through his acquaintances the business community, including Alan Roe, and joins the Freemasons. Nicky and Mary propose to one another and agree to marry. Geordie's fate remains unknown, as he does not appear in this episode.
8	"1987"	Simon Cellan Jones	Peter Flannery	4 March 1996
Nicky and Mary have been married for two years, and Mary has just become a grandmother. Nicky has become a successful photographer. As Council Leader, Mary is faced with hard decisions about service cuts. Felix has become senile from Alzheimer's disease and Florrie, realising she cannot cope, puts him into a home. Collins is involved in a siege on his estate and is shot and injured by a police marksman. Whilst on a book-signing trip to London, Nicky meets student Alice McDonald who is writing a dissertation on his work, and begins an affair with her. However, Alice suddenly ends the relationship. Tosker is still married to Elaine and has become a slum landlord. Elaine dislikes this and is worried by the influence that Roe has over him. So Tosker sells his properties, planning to set up a mortgage lending scheme for council tenants wanting to buy their homes. Mary tells Elaine that this is little more than a scam, and Elaine physically attacks Tosker, after which the two sit down and talk. Elaine tells him to put their money into shares, whilst sort out their relationship. Whilst taking photographs of homeless people in London, Nicky discovers Geordie amongst them; he has become an unstable alcoholic who does not recognise Nicky. Nicky is later unable to find him again and feels guilty. Wells, still a Labour MP, is frustrated at how the country has changed, and is a heavy drinker. He begins investigating the role of PR firms' illegal "payments for questions", particularly the firm run by Butler. Nicky discovers that Wells's researcher Francine is a plant by Butler, who has leaked her false information. Nicky manages to inform Wells, and he has to give up his planned exposé. Wells decides to retire and tries to persuade Mary to stand in his place, but she refuses. She also suspects that Nicky has been seeing someone else, and Nicky walks out on her. He tries to go out with Alice again, but she is not interested. Mary tries to save their marriage. Geordie ends up in a hostel and, after seeing Wells on television, becomes confused and sets fire to his bed. He is tried for arson and unexpectedly given life imprisonment. "Black Monday" occurs, wiping out the value of Tosker and Elaine's investments. They decide to sell their house and buy a couple of karaoke pubs to get back on their feet. Mary makes it clear to Nicky that their relationship has failed. The 1987 Storm hits, during which Wells suffers a heart attack and dies.
9	"1995"	Simon Cellan Jones	Peter Flannery	11 March 1996
Nicky, who has been living in Italy, returns to Newcastle to arrange Florrie's funeral. Felix is now in the full grip of Alzheimer's disease. Reading letters left by his mother, Nicky finds out more about his father and learns of his lifetime feeling of failure after the Jarrow March achieved nothing. Nicky takes him to see a woman in Yorkshire who remembers the Jarrow Marchers coming through her village. However it is impossible for Felix to register what is being said to him. Mary has become a Labour MP and quarrels with her policeman son as they deal with unrest on a local estate. Sean Collins, son of Christopher Collins, is being allowed to run wild, neglected by both mother and father and spending his time joyriding. Residents want the family moved, but Anthony sticks up for him. Tosker has become a successful businessman again, and he and Elaine prepare to open their floating nightclub on the River Tyne. Geordie arrives, having escaped from prison, and encounters Sean Collins by the river. He goes to the floating nightclub looking for work and is recognised by Elaine. Tosker is worried about Geordie's state of mind and prison record for arson. Nevertheless, he invites Geordie to stay at his house, and a job playing keyboard with the band for the opening night. Geordie sleeps on the floor of his room and leaves early in the morning. Mary is on her way to the opening night when Anthony calls round and announces that he is leaving his wife and children. The two row and Anthony pours out his resentments, saying she has been a martyr all her life. Nicky and Geordie meet by chance and have a drink. As they are leaving for Tosker's opening night, Geordie spots Sean who has come to see his father. When Collins is brusque with his son and tries to get rid of him, Geordie begs him to talk with his son, only to be head-butted. Sean steals a car, subsequently crashing into a wall and killing himself. Since Geordie fails to turn up, Tosker finally achieves his dream of playing with a band and he and Elaine are happy at the night's success. At Florrie's funeral, Nicky breaks down in tears and at the wake the four friends are briefly alone together for the first time in 31 years. Tosker leaves to be with Elaine and their young grandchildren. Just after Mary leaves, Nicky has a revelation and chases after her car, realising that he wants to renew their relationship. He catches her and asks to spend the day with her, which Mary happily agrees to. Geordie briefly watches Tosker playing with his family on his boat, before walking off along the Tyne Bridge alone.

== Background ==
=== Stage play ===
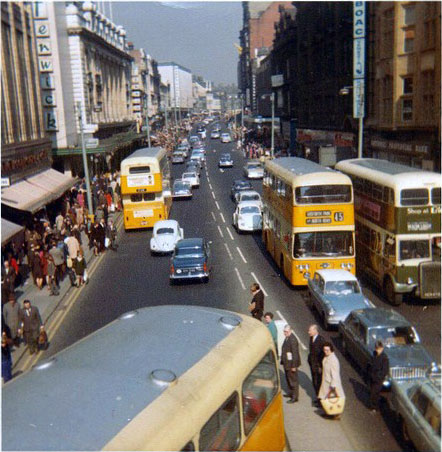
Northumberland Street in Newcastle upon Tyne, pictured in 1969 before it was pedestrianised. Life in Newcastle in the 1960s was a major influence on Peter Flannery's writing of Our Friends in the North.

Our Friends in the North was originally written by the playwright Peter Flannery for the theatre, while he was a writer in residence for the Royal Shakespeare Company (RSC). The idea came to Flannery while he was watching the rehearsals for the company's production of Henry IV, Part 1 and Part 2 at Stratford-upon-Avon in 1980; the scale of the plays inspired him to come up with his own historical epic. The original three-hour long theatre version of Our Friends in the North, directed by John Caird and featuring Jim Broadbent and Roger Allam among the cast, was produced by the RSC in 1982. It initially ran for a week at The Other Place in Stratford before touring to the city in which it was set, Newcastle upon Tyne, and then playing at The Pit, a studio theatre in the Barbican Centre in London.

In its original form the story went up only to the 1979 general election and the coming to power of the new Conservative government under Margaret Thatcher. The play also contained a significant number of scenes set in Rhodesia, chronicling UDI, the oil embargo and the emergence of armed resistance to white supremacy. This plot strand was dropped from the televised version, although the title Our Friends in the North, a reference to how staff at BP in South Africa referred to the Rhodesian government of Ian Smith, remained.

Flannery was heavily influenced not only by his own political viewpoints and life experiences but also by the actual history of his home city of Newcastle during the 1960s and 1970s. Characters such as Austin Donohue and John Edwards were directly based on the real-life scandals of T. Dan Smith and John Poulson. Flannery contacted Smith and explained that he was going to write a play based on the events of the scandal, to which Smith replied, "There is a play here of Shakespearean proportions."

=== 1980s attempts at production ===
The stage version of Our Friends in the North was seen by BBC television drama producer Michael Wearing in Newcastle in 1982, and he was immediately keen on producing a television adaptation. At that time, Wearing was based at the BBC English Regions Drama Department at BBC Pebble Mill in Birmingham, which had a specific remit for making "regional drama". Wearing initially approached Flannery to adapt his play into a four-part television serial for BBC2, with each episode being 50 minutes long and the Rhodesian strand dropped for practical reasons. A change of executives meant that the project was not produced, although Wearing persisted in trying to get it commissioned. Flannery extended the serial to six episodes, one for each United Kingdom general election from 1964 to 1979. However, by this point in the mid-1980s, Michael Grade was Director of Programmes for BBC Television, and he had no interest in the project.

By 1989, Wearing had been recalled to the central BBC drama department in London where he was made Head of Serials. This new seniority eventually allowed him to further the cause of Our Friends in the North. Flannery wrote to the BBC's then managing director of television, Will Wyatt, "accusing him of cowardice for not approving it." The BBC was concerned not only with the budget and resources that would be required to produce the serial, but also with potential legal issues. Much of the background story was based on real-life events and people, such as Smith and Poulson and former Home Secretary Reginald Maudling, upon whom another character, Claud Seabrook, was based. According to The Observer newspaper, one senior BBC lawyer, Glen Del Medico, even threatened to resign if the production was made. Others tried to persuade Flannery to reset the piece "in a fictional country called Albion rather than Britain." Both Smith and Poulson died before the programme aired.

=== Pre-production ===
In 1992, Wearing was able to persuade the controller of BBC Two, Alan Yentob, to commission Peter Flannery to write scripts for a new version of the project. Yentob had no great enthusiasm for Our Friends in the North, as he remembered a meeting with Flannery in 1988, when the writer had left him unimpressed by stating that Our Friends in the North was about "post-war social housing policy". As Wearing was now a head of department at the BBC, he was too busy overseeing other projects to produce Our Friends in the North. George Faber was briefly attached to the project as producer before he moved on to become Head of Single Drama at the BBC. Faber was succeeded by a young producer with great enthusiasm for the project, Charles Pattinson.

When Yentob was succeeded as controller of BBC Two by Michael Jackson, Pattinson was able to persuade him to commission full production on the series. This was in spite of the fact that Jackson and Wearing were not close and did not get on; Pattinson took to dealing with Jackson directly. Jackson had agreed to nine one-hour episodes but Flannery protested that each episode should be as long as it needed to be, to which Jackson agreed. The long delay in production did have the advantage of allowing Flannery to extend the story and instead of ending in 1979, it carried on into the 1990s, bringing the four central characters into middle age. Flannery later commented that: "The project has undoubtedly benefited from the delay. I'm not sure I have". The series encountered more legal problems, when some references to the fictional businessman Alan Roe were removed, because of a perceived similarity to Sir John Hall, a Newcastle businessman who had a number of things in common. The drama had originally shown Roe as taking advantage of tax subsidies to build a large shopping centre.

== Production and broadcast ==
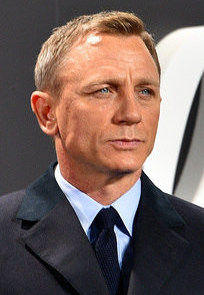
Daniel Craig (pictured in 2015) played George 'Geordie' Peacock, one of the four main characters in Our Friends in the North. It was one of his first major starring roles on British television.

The scale of Our Friends in the North required BBC Two controller Michael Jackson to devote a budget of £8 million to the production, which was half of his channel's drama serials budget for the entire year. Producer Charles Pattinson attempted to gain co-production funding from overseas broadcasters, but met with a lack of interest. Pattinson believed it was because the story was so much about Britain and had limited appeal to other countries. BBC Worldwide, the corporation's commercial arm which sold its programmes overseas, offered only £20,000 of funding towards the production. The speaking cast of Our Friends in the North numbered 160; more than 3,000 extras were used, and filming took place across 40 weeks, from November 1994 until September 1995.

=== Directors ===
The first director approached to helm the production by Michael Wearing was Danny Boyle. Boyle was keen to direct all nine episodes, but Pattinson believed that one director taking charge of the entire serial would be too punishing a schedule for whoever was chosen. Boyle had recently completed work on the feature film Shallow Grave and wanted to see how that film was received before committing to Our Friends in the North. When Shallow Grave proved to be a critical success, Boyle was able to enter pre-production on Trainspotting. He withdrew from Our Friends in the North. Sir Peter Hall was also briefly considered, but he too had other production commitments.

Two directors were finally chosen to helm the project. Stuart Urban was assigned the first five episodes and Simon Cellan Jones the final four. However, after completing the first two episodes and some of the shooting for the third, Urban left the project after disagreements with the production team. Peter Flannery was concerned that Urban's directorial style was not suited to the material that he had written. Christopher Eccleston's viewpoint is that Urban was "only interested in painting pretty pictures." Pattinson agreed that a change was needed, and Michael Jackson agreed to a change of director mid-way through production, which was unusual for a British television drama of this type so far into proceedings. Director Pedr James, who had recently directed an adaptation of Martin Chuzzlewit for Michael Wearing's department, was hired to shoot the remainder of what were to have been Urban's episodes.

=== Casting ===
According to production paperwork, Helen Baxendale, Alan Cumming, Sean Pertwee and Paterson Joseph were considered for the lead roles.

Of the actors cast in the four leading roles, only Gina McKee was a native of North East England, and she was from Sunderland rather than from Newcastle. McKee related strongly to many of the characters and story elements in the scripts and was very keen to play Mary, but the production team was initially uncertain whether it would be possible to age her up convincingly enough to portray the character in her 50s. McKee was concerned that she would not be given the part after an unsuccessful makeup test where efforts to make her appear to be in her 50s resulted in her resembling a drag queen.

Christopher Eccleston was the only one of the four lead actors who was already an established television face, having previously co-starred in the ITV crime drama series Cracker. Eccleston first heard about the project while working with Danny Boyle on the film Shallow Grave in the autumn of 1993. Initially, Eccleston had been considered by the production team as a candidate to play Geordie, but he was more interested in playing Nicky, whom he saw as a more emotionally complex character. Eccleston was particularly concerned about being able to perform with the Newcastle Geordie accent. He did not even attempt the accent at his audition, concentrating instead on characterisation. He drew inspiration for his performance as the older Nicky from Peter Flannery, basing aspects of his characterisation on Flannery's personality. He even wore some of the writer's colourful shirts.

Daniel Craig was auditioned late for the role of Geordie. At the audition he performed the Geordie accent very poorly but won the part, which came to be regarded as his breakthrough role. Mark Strong worked on the Geordie accent by studying episodes of the 1980s comedy series Auf Wiedersehen, Pet, which featured lead characters from Newcastle. Strong later claimed that Christopher Eccleston took a dislike to him and outside of their scenes together, the pair did not speak while the series was filming.

Among the supporting roles, one of the highest-profile pieces of casting was Malcolm McDowell as Soho porn baron Benny Barratt. Barratt appears in scenes in episodes from 1966 to 1979, but the production could only afford him for three weeks. This was because McDowell was then a resident of the United States. All of McDowell's scenes were shot by Stuart Urban as part of the first block of filming; the rest of the production was filmed roughly chronologically. This was considered more than worthwhile, however, for the prestige of being able to use an actor such as McDowell, predominantly a film actor who seldom did television work.

Daniel Craig's performance would first bring him to the attention of producer Barbara Broccoli, who later cast him in the role of secret agent James Bond in the long-running film series. Christopher Eccleston also went on to achieve success as a long-running, well-known fictional character when he appeared as the Ninth Doctor in the BBC science-fiction series Doctor Who in 2005. Since then various media articles have noted the coincidence of the future James Bond and Doctor Who leads having co-starred in the same production earlier in their careers.

=== Episode one re-shoot ===
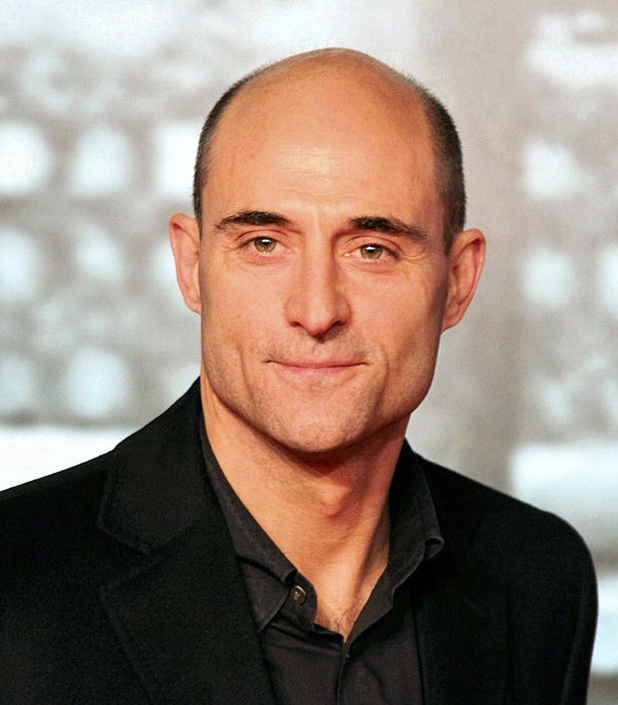
Mark Strong (pictured in 2010) played Terry 'Tosker' Cox across thirty years of his life in Our Friends in the North, from a young man in 1964 to middle-age in 1995.

After Stuart Urban left the production and the decision had been made to re-shoot some of the material that he had completed with Pedr James directing, producer Charles Pattinson suggested to Peter Flannery that the first episode should not simply be remade, but also rewritten. Flannery took the opportunity to completely change the opening storyline, introducing the love story element between Nicky and Mary earlier. This was introduced in later episodes of the television version, but had not been part of the original play. Other storyline and character changes were made with the new version of the first episode because it was the script that had most closely resembled the original stage play. Michael Wearing felt that the story could be expanded to a greater degree for television.

Production of the new version of the opening episode took place in what was to have been a three-week break for the cast between production blocks. Gina McKee was initially very concerned about having her character's early life story changed when she had already based elements of her later performance on the previously established version. Eccleston was also unhappy about the sudden changes. However, McKee felt that the new version of episode one eventually made for a much stronger opening to the story.

Due to budgetary constraints, it was not possible to re-shoot some scenes of episode one in the north-east, and they instead had to be filmed in and around Watford. Beach-set scenes were shot at Folkestone rather than Whitley Bay, which was obvious to locals on screen due to the presence of pebbles on the beach, which are not present at Whitley Bay. This led to some critics mockingly referring to the production as Our Friends in the South.

=== Music ===
Contemporary popular music was used throughout the production to evoke the feel of the year in which each episode was set. The BBC's existing agreements with various music publishers and record labels meant that the production team was easily able to obtain the rights to use most of the desired songs. A particular piece of synchronicity occurred in the final episode, 1995, which Cellan Jones had decided to close with the song "Don't Look Back in Anger" by Oasis from the album (What's the Story) Morning Glory?. While Our Friends in the North was airing, it was released as a single and was at number three in the UK Singles Chart in the week of the final episode's transmission.

=== Broadcast ===
Our Friends in the North was broadcast in nine episodes on BBC2 at 9pm on Monday nights, from 15 January to 11 March 1996. The episode lengths varied, with 1966 being the shortest at 63 minutes, 48 seconds and 1987 the longest at 74 minutes, 40 seconds. The total running time of the serial is 623 minutes.

The first episode of Our Friends in the North gained 5.1 million viewers on its original transmission. In terms of viewing figures, the series was BBC2's most successful weekly drama for five years.

== Reception ==
=== Critical response ===
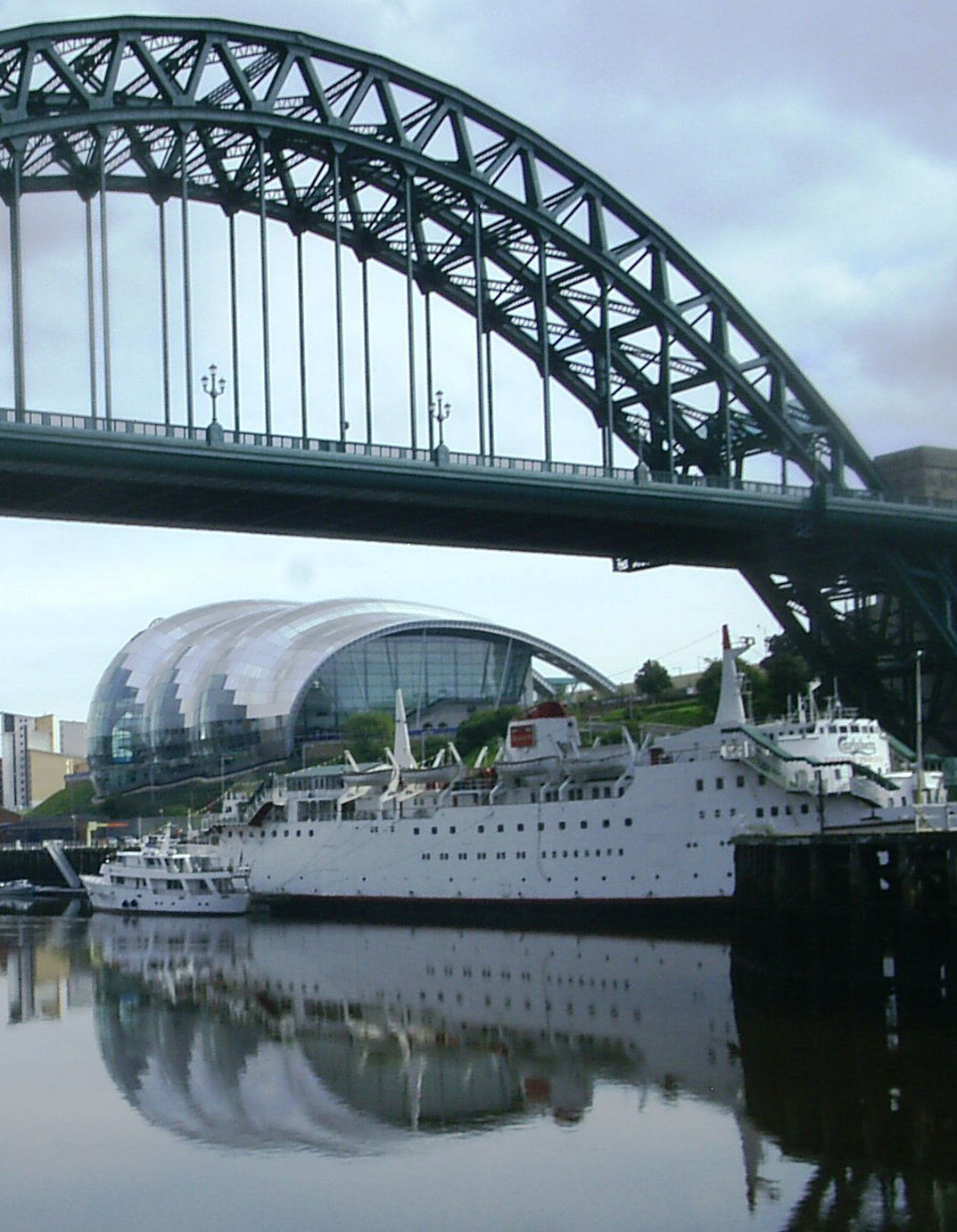
The floating nightclub Tuxedo Princess beneath the Tyne Bridge in Newcastle, pictured in 2005. Both of these locations feature prominently in Our Friends in the North.

Both during and after its original transmission on BBC2, the serial was generally praised by the critics. Reviewing the first episode in The Observer newspaper, Ian Bell wrote: "Flannery's script is faultless; funny, chilling, evocative, spare, linguistically precise. The four young friends about to share 31 hellish years in the life of modern Britain are excellently played."

The conclusion of the serial in March brought similar praise. "Our Friends in the North confounded the gloomier predictions about its content and proved that there was an audience for political material, provided that it found its way to the screen through lives imagined in emotional detail ... It will be remembered for an intimate sense of character, powerful enough to make you forgive its faults and stay loyal to the end," was the verdict of The Independent on the final episode. Writing in the same newspaper the following day, Jeffrey Richards added that "Monday night's final episode of Our Friends in the North has left many people bereft. The serial captivated much of the country, sketching a panoramic view of life in Britain from the sixties to the nineties ... At once sweeping and intimate, both moving and angry, simultaneously historical and contemporary, it has followed in the distinguished footsteps of BBC series such as Boys from the Blackstuff."

However, the response was not exclusively positive. In The Independent on Sunday, columnist Lucy Ellmann criticised both what she saw as the unchanging nature of the characters and Flannery's concentration on friendship rather than family. "What's in the water there anyway? These are the youngest grandparents ever seen! Nothing has changed about them since 1964 except a few grey hairs ... It's quite impressive that anything emotional could be salvaged from this nine-part hop, skip and jump through the years. In fact we still hardly know these people – zooming from one decade to the next has a distancing effect," she wrote of the former point. And of the latter, "Peter Flannery seems to want to suggest that friendships are the only cure for a life blighted by deficient parents. But all that links this ill-matched foursome in the end is history and sentimentality. The emotional centre of the writing is still in family ties."

Michael Jackson, the BBC2 controller who had finally commissioned production of the serial, felt that even though it was successful, its social realist form was outdated. The academic Georgina Born, writing in 2004, also felt that although the serial had its strengths, it also contained "involuntary marks of pastiche" in its treatment of social realism. In contrast, the British Film Institute's Screenonline website praises the serial for its realistic and un-clichéd depiction of life in the North East, stating that: "Unlike many depictions of the North-East, it has fully rounded characters with authentic regional accents. It's clearly a real place, not a generic 'up North'."

=== Awards and recognition ===
At the British Academy Television Awards (BAFTAs) in 1997, Our Friends in the North won the award for Best Drama Serial, ahead of other nominees The Crow Road, The Fragile Heart and Gulliver's Travels. At the same ceremony, Gina McKee won the Best Actress category. Both Christopher Eccleston and Peter Vaughan (who played Nicky's father, Felix) were nominated for the Best Actor award for their performances in Our Friends in the North, but they lost to Nigel Hawthorne for his role in The Fragile Heart. Also at the 1997 BAFTAs, Peter Flannery was presented with the honorary Dennis Potter Award for his work on the serial. Our Friends in the North also gained BAFTA nominations for costume design, sound, and photography and lighting.

The Royal Television Society Awards covering the year 1996 saw Our Friends in the North win the Best Drama Serial category, and Peter Flannery was given the Writer's Award. Peter Vaughan also gained another Best Actor nomination for his role as Felix. At the 1997 Broadcasting Press Guild Awards, Our Friends in the North won the categories for Best Drama Series or Serial, Best Actor (Eccleston), Best Actress (McKee) and the Writer's Award for Peter Flannery.

In the United States, Our Friends in the North was awarded a Certificate of Merit in the Television Drama Miniseries category at the San Francisco International Film Festival in 1997.

In 2000, the British Film Institute conducted a poll of industry professionals to find the 100 Greatest British Television Programmes of the 20th century, with Our Friends in the North finishing in twenty-fifth position, eighth position out of the dramas featured on the list. The commentary for the Our Friends in the North entry on the BFI website described it as a "powerful and evocative drama series ... The series impressed with its ambition, humanity and willingness to see the ambiguities beyond the rhetoric." The serial was also included in an alphabetical list of the 40 greatest TV shows published by the Radio Times magazine in August 2003, chosen by their television editor Alison Graham. In January 2010, the website of The Guardian newspaper produced a list of "The top 50 TV dramas of all time," in which Our Friends in the North was ranked in third position.

== Legacy ==
Following the success of Our Friends in the North, Flannery proposed a "kind of prequel" to the serial under the title of Our Friends in the South. This would have told the story of the Jarrow March. Although the BBC initially took up the project, it did not progress to script stage and was eventually abandoned.

Our Friends in the North was given a repeat run on BBC2 the year following its original broadcast, running on Saturday evenings from 19 July to 13 September 1997. It received a second repeat run on the BBC ten years after its original broadcast, running on BBC Four from 8 February to 29 March 2006. In the early 2000s, the serial was also repeated on the UK Drama channel.

In April 1997, the serial was released on VHS by BMG Video in two sets, 1964 – 1974 and 1979 – 1995. In 2002, BMG released the series on DVD, which along with the original episodes contained several extra features, including a retrospective discussion of the series by Wearing, Pattinson, Flannery, James and Cellan Jones, and specially shot interviews with Eccleston and McKee. Simply Media brought out a second DVD release of the serial in September 2010, although on this occasion there were no extra features. This edition contained an edit not present on the 2002 BMG release; most of the song "Don't Look Back in Anger" by Oasis is removed at the end of the final episode, fading out early and the credits instead running in silence.

Our Friends in the North has been invoked on several occasions as a comparison when similar drama programmes have been screened on British television. The year following Our Friends in the North's broadcast, Tony Marchant's drama serial Holding On was promoted by the BBC as being an "Our Friends in the South," after Marchant made the comparison when discussing it with executives. The 2001 BBC Two drama serial In a Land of Plenty was previewed by The Observer newspaper as being "the most ambitious television drama since Our Friends in the North." The writer Paula Milne drew inspiration from Our Friends in the North for her own White Heat (2012); she felt that Our Friends in the North had been too centred on white, male, heterosexual characters and she deliberately wanted to counter that focus. The original stage version of Our Friends in the North was revived in Newcastle by Northern Stage in 2007, with 14 cast members playing 40 characters. In August 2016, Flannery was interviewed for an event, part of the Whitley Bay Film Festival, that celebrated the 20th anniversary of the series being broadcast. In February 2026, Flannery and Eccleston attended the showing of an episode from the series at the Tyneside Cinema in Newcastle to mark the show's 30th anniversary,.

== Radio ==
In February 2022, it was announced that Peter Flannery had revived and rewritten Our Friends in the North for BBC Radio 4, with a tenth episode, written by Adam Usden, set in Newcastle in 2020.

Produced and directed by Melanie Harris, and with lead sound design by Eloise Whitmore, it features James Baxter, Norah Lopez Holden, Philip Correia and Luke MacGregor as, respectively, Nicky, Mary, Tosker and Geordie, Bryony Corrigan as Amy and with Tracey Wilkinson and Trevor Fox reappearing from the TV series but in new roles.

The cast also includes Tom Goodman-Hill, Eve Shotton, David Leon, Tom Machell, James Gaddas, Tony Hirst, Des Yankson and Maanuv Thiara; weekly broadcasts began 17 March 2022.
