= Stephanie Putson =

English actress

- Born: August 1, 1973 (age 53); Teesside, England
- Education: London Academy of Music and Dramatic Art
- Years active: 1995–present
- Known for: Billy Elliot the Musical

Stephanie Putson (born August 1973) is an English film, television, and stage actress.

Born on Teesside, Steph graduated from the London Academy of Music & Dramatic Art (LAMDA) and after taking to the stage she gained her first screen role in the Tyne Tees Television serial The Gambling Man (1995) in which she had the lead role of Janie, opposite Robson Green. Since then, she has mostly appeared on television and stage.

Putson originated the part of Billy's Mum in the London stage production of Billy Elliot the Musical, which ran from 2005 until 2016.

== Filmography ==
- The Gambling Man (1995) as Janie Waggett
- Our Friends in the North: 1984 (1996) as Bernadette Cox
- A Touch of Frost:Penny for the Guy (1997) as Joy Anderton
- Internal Inferno (1998) as Sylvie Webster
- Heartbeat: Pat-a-cake (1998) as Karen
- Holby City: Staying Alive (1999) as WPC Gorse
- The Bill: Pond Life (1999) as Alison Dunbar
- Playing the Field (2000) as Heidi
- King Arthur (2004) as Lancelot's mother
