= Tuxedo floating nightclubs =

Repurposed moored car ferries (1983–2011)

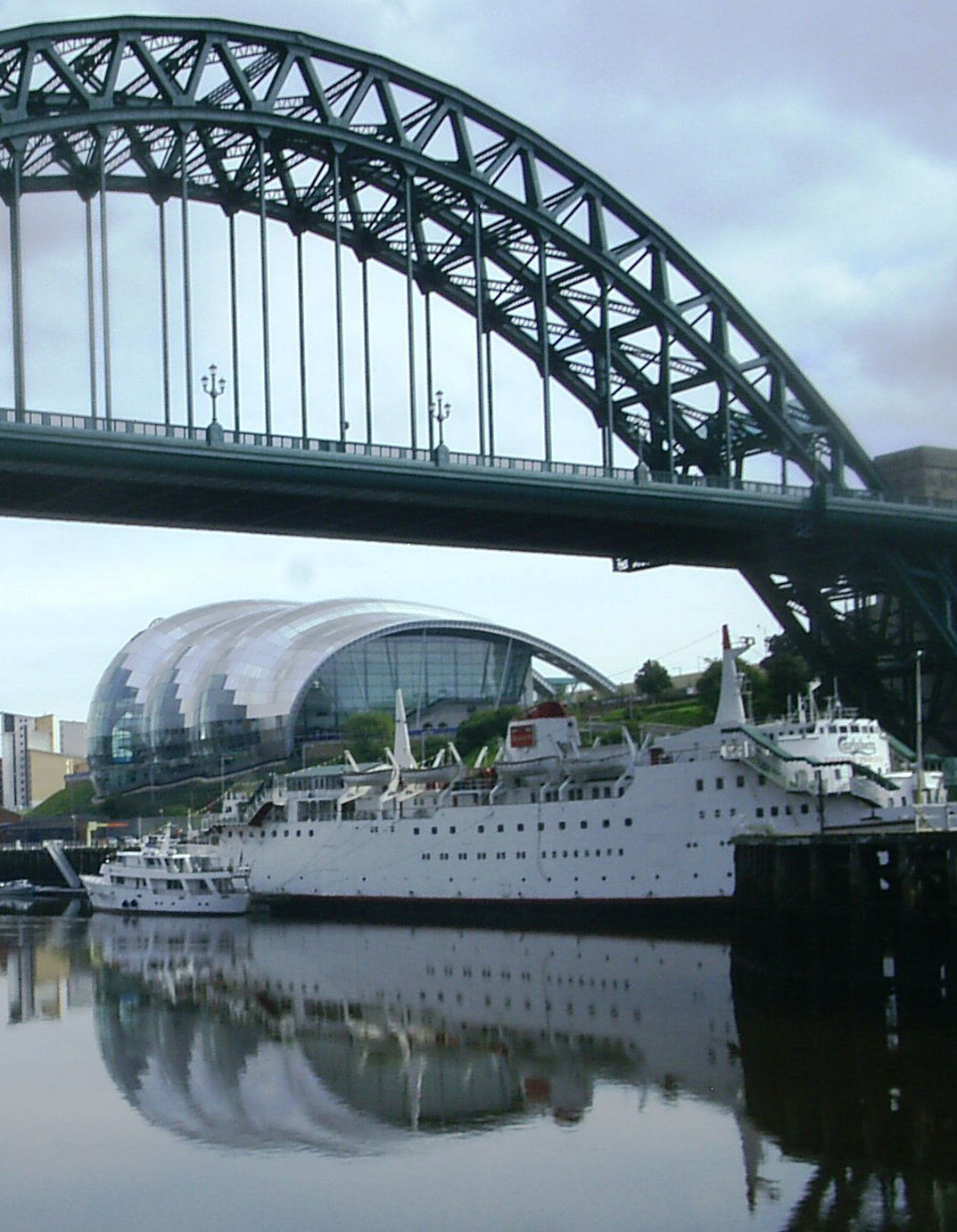
The Tuxedo Princess moored beneath the Tyne Bridge, September 2005. The Glasshouse is the building in the background.

The Tuxedo Princess (ex-TSS Caledonian Princess) and Tuxedo Royale (ex-TSS Dover) were two former car ferries used as permanently moored floating nightclubs in the United Kingdom from the 1980s to the 2000s. Both ships saw use on the River Tyne at different times, while the Princess also saw use on the River Clyde in Glasgow, and the Royale on the River Tees in Middlesbrough.

== Locations ==
The Tuxedo Princess was the first of the two floating nightclubs, moored on the Tyne. When the Tuxedo Princess was briefly moved to Glasgow, the Tuxedo Royale took up her position. When the Tuxedo Princess returned, the Tuxedo Royale was moved to Middlesbrough.

== Inception ==
The idea of buying a second-hand ship to serve as a floating nightclub to be moored on the Tyne originated with Tyneside-based businessman Michael Quadrini (1943–2023), who already owned the popular Tuxedo Junction nightclub in Newcastle, and several bars, and was looking for a larger venue. And so he purchased the Caledonian Princess, renaming her the Tuxedo Princess. The vessel had been built in 1961 as a car ferry, in which role it served until 1981. The later Tuxedo Royale was also a former car ferry, the Dover, built in 1965.

Originally the Tuxedo Princess was to be moored on the Newcastle side of the Tyne, but after failing to get planning consent, she was moored on the south bank, the Gateshead waterfront. When it first opened in December 1983, the club had a strict dress code for patrons, while the staff all wore naval uniforms, a tradition carried on by resident DJ Chris King, who worked in a US Naval officer's uniform.

== Music and marketing ==
The music policy on both ships was contemporary dance, with some specialisations, notably on board Tuxedo Royale, which benefitted from two club areas. The music policy featured pop-dance in the below-decks club played by DJ Chris King, resplendent in his US Navy Officer's uniform, while DJ Tim Prince (who later worked as Tim 'Bomber' Lancaster), played soul, jazz, funk, and later NY house and garage, in the upstairs First Class Lounge, and on the Tuxedo Royale, there was a mid-week student night playing rock and alternative.

Both ships boasted restaurants and a variety of bars. Early-evening 'triples' deals offered three shots of spirits in a glass for the price of a single shot, and played a role in encouraging clubbers on board earlier than would otherwise have been the case. Door and wet take were the mainstay of revenue, with the restaurants functioning largely as loss-leaders.

== Impact ==
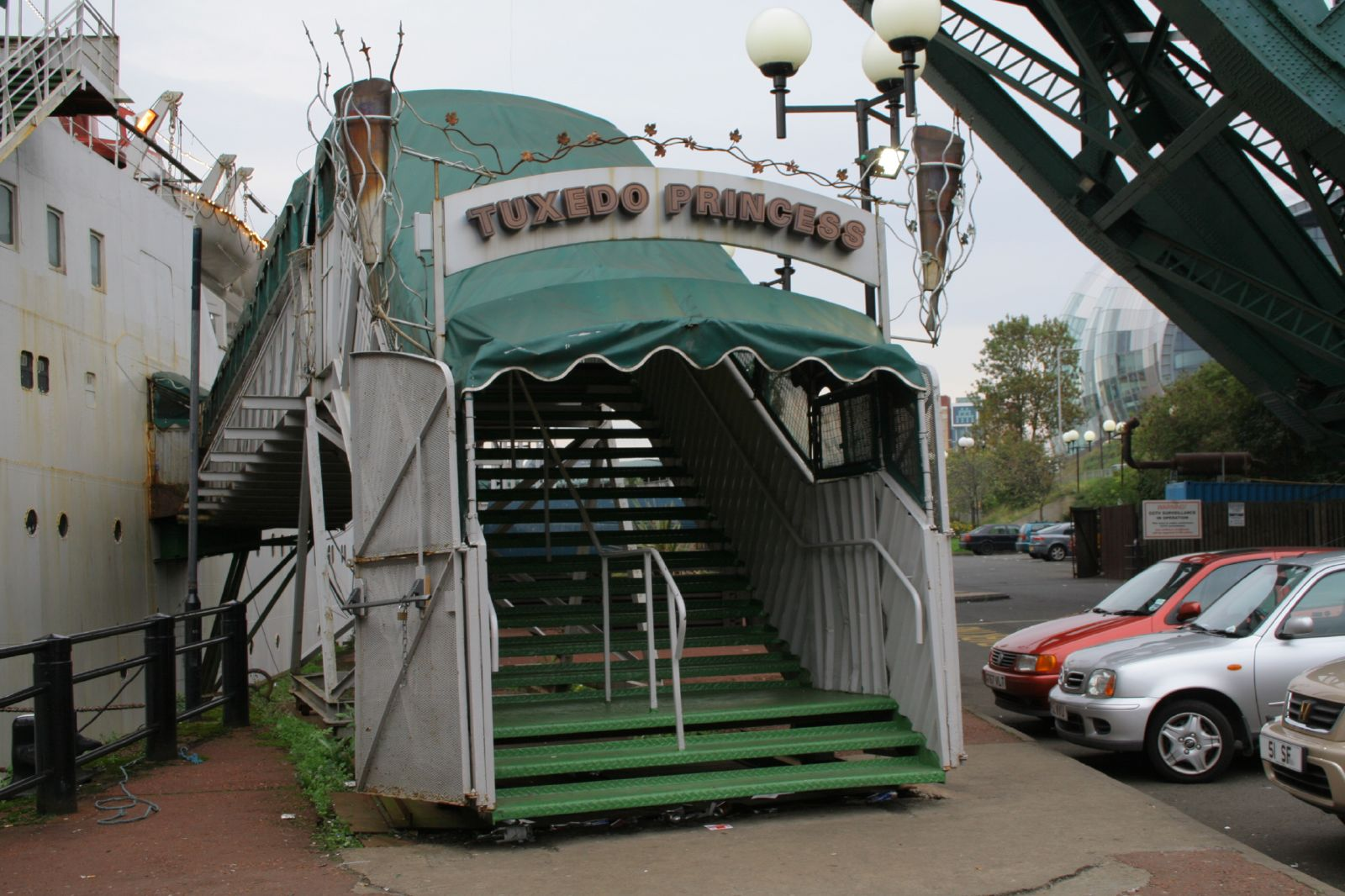
Entrance to the Tuxedo Princess, September 2006

According to the BBC, the Tuxedo Princess became a Tyneside icon during her stay, one of the most recognisable landmarks of the region. According to the Evening Chronicle, in her heyday the Tuxedo Princess was "a celebrity haunt", and she became affectionately known as The Boat by Geordies.

While moored in the Tyne, the Tuxedo Princess was host to several famous people including Frederik, Crown Prince of Denmark, composer Andrew Lloyd Webber, actor Kevin Costner, DJ Noel Edmonds, comedian Freddie Starr, singers Mick Hucknall, Rick Astley, Nik Kershaw and Jason Donovan, pop group Frankie Goes to Hollywood, the cast of Auf Wiedersehen, Pet, athlete Daley Thompson, cricketers Ian Botham, Wasim Akram, footballers Kevin Keegan and Paul Gascoigne, and snooker player Steve Davis. She also played a role in the lives of famous Geordie people. Singer Cheryl originally worked on the Tuxedo Princess before becoming a singer, while actor Tim Healy proposed to his future wife Denise Welch on board the club.

In popular culture, the Tuxedo Princess was used by the BBC to film scenes for a storyline in the Newcastle-based television drama Our Friends in the North, in which the character Terry 'Tosker' Cox (Mark Strong), a Tyneside businessman, opens a floating nightclub on the Tyne.

In the Maxïmo Park song "In Another World", from their third album Quicken The Heart, the "revolving dancefloor in the middle of the river" refers to the famous revolving dancefloor on board.

== Fate ==
=== Tuxedo Princess ===
In December 2007 a farewell party for 300 invited guests was held on the Tuxedo Princess. The ship was finally towed from her mooring on the Tyne on 27 July 2008. Describing it as "the end of an era", according to the BBC there were mixed reactions to the removal of the Tuxedo Princess, citing one expressed view of nostalgia for the nightclub's role in the city's night life, and another welcoming removal of an eyesore, opening up new views of the bridges. According to the Evening Chronicle, crowds gathered to watch the ship's departure. Despite hopes of a future in Greece, Tuxedo Princess was scrapped in Turkey. The quayside area vacated by the Tuxedo Princess was to be redeveloped into a leisure, restaurant and office complex. As of the 2018 summer, the area now hosts the Gateshead riverside shipping container village.

=== Tuxedo Royale ===
In May 2011, the Tuxedo Royale started to sink into the River Tees due to vandalism by metal thieves.

In June 2014 businessman Terry Owens started a campaign to restore the vessel from a nearby dry dock, which would cost in the region of £250,000. The intention was to apply for lottery funding to finance the works.

In June 2017, the Tuxedo Royale was badly damaged by fire whilst docked on the river

In January 2018 it was announced that work would begin on demolition of the Tuxedo Royale to allow the dockside to be used once again for commercial traffic; however it was not until September 2019 that, having been re-floated (following asbestos removal) the vessel was towed to Hartlepool to be scrapped.
