= Playing the Field =

- Genre: Drama
- Created by: Kay Mellor
- Country of origin: United Kingdom
- Original language: English
- No. of series: 5
- No. of episodes: 32

Production
- Executive producers: Charles Brand; Tessa Ross; Kay Mellor
- Producers: Kathleen Hutchison; Hugh Warren; Greg Brenman; Lis Steele
- Running time: 60 minutes
- Production company: Tiger Aspect Productions

Original release
- Network: BBC One
- Release: 8 March 1998 – 10 February 2002

Playing the Field is a BBC television drama series following the lives of the Castlefield Blues, a fictitious female football team from South Yorkshire.

== Outline ==
Inspired by Pete Davies's book I Lost My Heart to the Belles – which was written about a real-life club, the Doncaster Belles – Playing the Field ran for five series, from 8 March 1998 to 10 February 2002, with scripts by, amongst others, Kay Mellor, Sally Wainwright and Gaynor Faye.

Despite being set in South Yorkshire, much of the location filming took place in Ilkeston, Derbyshire, although the fifth (and final) series was filmed around Leeds. The theme song, "Blue" by Alison Moyet, was originally a B-side track about the singer's love of Southend United FC. A young Marsha Thomason – who has since appeared in American television shows Las Vegas and Lost – featured in the first three series of Playing the Field. The first four series have been released on DVD in the UK, but the fifth has yet to be made available.

== Main cast ==
- Lorraine Ashbourne – Geraldine Powell
- Melanie Hill – Rita Dolan
- Jo McInnes – Jo Mullen
- Lesley Sharp – Theresa Mullen (Series 1–4)
- Marsha Thomason – Sharon 'Shazza' Pearce (Series 1–3)
- Saira Todd – Gabrielle 'Gabby' Holmes (Series 1–2)
- Debra Stephenson – Diane Powell (Series 1–3)
- Tracy Whitwell – Angie Gill (Series 1–2)
- Emma Rydall – Mikey (Series 1–4)
- Olivia Caffrey – Kate Howard (Series 2)
- Gaynor Faye – Holly Quinn (Series 4–5)
- Claudie Blakley – Kelly Powell (Series 3–5)
- James Nesbitt – James Dolan (Series 1–3)
- Tim Dantay – Dave Powell
- Nicholas Gleaves – Rick Powell
- Ralph Ineson – Luke Mullen
- Chris Walker – Matthew Mullen
- John Thomson – Eddie Ryan (Series 1–3)
- James Thornton – Scott Bradley (Series 3–4)
- Lee Ross – Ryan Pratt (Series 2–4)
- James Ellis – Mr. Mullen
- Brigit Forsyth – Francine Pratt
- Elizabeth Spriggs – Mrs. Mullen
- Ricky Tomlinson – Jim Pratt
- Jason O'Mara – Lee Quinn (Series 4–5)
- Tom Moore – Martin Dolan
- Stephanie Putson – Heidi (Series 3–4)
- Kelli Hollis – Lizzie Makin (Series 5)

== Episodes ==
=== Series overview ===
| Series | Episodes | Originally released | |
| Series | Episodes | First released | Last released |
|---|---|---|---|
| 1 | 6 | 8 March 1998 | 12 April 1998 |
| 2 | 7 | 18 February 1999 | 1 April 1999 |
| 3 | 6 | 1 February 2000 | 9 March 2000 |
| 4 | 7 | 13 July 2000 | 24 August 2000 |
| 5 | 6 | 6 January 2002 | 10 February 2002 |

=== Series 1 (1998) ===
| No. overall | No. in series | Title | Directed by | Written by | Original release date |
|---|---|---|---|---|---|
| 1 | 1 | "Episode 1" | Paul Seed | Kay Mellor | 8 March 1998 |
| 2 | 2 | "Episode 2" | Paul Seed | Kay Mellor | 15 March 1998 |
| 3 | 3 | "Episode 3" | Paul Seed | Kay Mellor | 22 March 1998 |
| 4 | 4 | "Episode 4" | Catherine Morshead | Kay Mellor | 29 March 1998 |
| 5 | 5 | "Episode 5" | Catherine Morshead | Kay Mellor | 5 April 1998 |
| 6 | 6 | "Episode 6" | Catherine Morshead | Kay Mellor | 12 April 1998 |

=== Series 2 (1999) ===
| No. overall | No. in series | Title | Directed by | Written by | Original release date |
|---|---|---|---|---|---|
| 7 | 1 | "Episode 1" | Nicholas Laughland | Kay Mellor | 18 February 1999 |
| 8 | 2 | "Episode 2" | Nicholas Laughland | Kay Mellor | 25 February 1999 |
| 9 | 3 | "Episode 3" | Nicholas Laughland | Kay Mellor | 4 March 1999 |
| 10 | 4 | "Episode 4" | Nicholas Laughland | Sally Wainwright | 11 March 1999 |
| 11 | 5 | "Episode 5" | Robin Sheppard | Valerie Windsor | 18 March 1999 |
| 12 | 6 | "Episode 6" | Robin Sheppard | Valerie Windsor | 25 March 1999 |
| 13 | 7 | "Episode 7" | Robin Sheppard | Sally Wainwright | 1 April 1999 |

=== Series 3 (2000) ===
| No. overall | No. in series | Title | Directed by | Written by | Original release date |
|---|---|---|---|---|---|
| 14 | 1 | "Episode 1" | Dermot Boyd | Kay Mellor | 1 February 2000 |
| 15 | 2 | "Episode 2" | Dermot Boyd | Katie Baxendale | 8 February 2000 |
| 16 | 3 | "Episode 3" | Dermot Boyd | Jan McVerry | 15 February 2000 |
| 17 | 4 | "Episode 4" | David Innes Edwards | Kay Mellor | 24 February 2000 |
| 18 | 5 | "Episode 5" | David Innes Edwards | Kay Mellor | 2 March 2000 |
| 19 | 6 | "Episode 6" | David Innes Edwards | Katie Baxendale | 9 March 2000 |

=== Series 4 (2000) ===
| No. overall | No. in series | Title | Directed by | Written by | Original release date |
|---|---|---|---|---|---|
| 20 | 1 | "Episode 1" | Alrick Riley | Sally Wainwright | 13 July 2000 |
| 21 | 2 | "Episode 2" | Alrick Riley | Katie Baxendale | 20 July 2000 |
| 22 | 3 | "Episode 3" | Alrick Riley | Greg Snow | 27 July 2000 |
| 23 | 4 | "Episode 4" | Dermot Boyd | Sally Wainwright | 3 August 2000 |
| 24 | 5 | "Episode 5" | Dermot Boyd | Katie Baxendale | 10 August 2000 |
| 25 | 6 | "Episode 6" | Dermot Boyd | Russell Lewis | 17 August 2000 |
| 26 | 7 | "Episode 7" | Dermot Boyd | Greg Snow | 24 August 2000 |

=== Series 5 (2002) ===
| No. overall | No. in series | Title | Directed by | Written by | Original release date |
|---|---|---|---|---|---|
| 27 | 1 | "Episode 1" | Robert Knights | Gaynor Faye | 6 January 2002 |
| 28 | 2 | "Episode 2" | Robert Knights | Gaynor Faye | 13 January 2002 |
| 29 | 3 | "Episode 3" | Andrew Margetson | Sarah-Louise Hawkins | 20 January 2002 |
| 30 | 4 | "Episode 4" | Andrew Margetson | Sarah-Louise Hawkins | 27 January 2002 |
| 31 | 5 | "Episode 5" | Rob Bailey | Katie Baxendale | 3 February 2002 |
| 32 | 6 | "Episode 6" | Rob Bailey | Katie Baxendale | 10 February 2002 |

== Ratings ==
| Episode No. | Airdate | Total Viewers | BBC Weekly Rank |
|---|---|---|---|
| 2.1 | 18 February 1999 | 8,160,000 | 18 |
| 2.2 | 25 February 1999 | 7,490,000 | 22 |
| 2.3 | 4 March 1999 | 7.200,000 | 22 |
| 2.4 | 11 March 1999 | Under 6,050,000 | N/A |
| 2.5 | 18 March 1999 | 7,090,000 | 24 |
| 2.6 | 25 March 1999 | 7,710,000 | 18 |
| 2.7 | 1 April 1999 | 7,770,000 | 17 |

| Episode No. | Airdate | Total Viewers | BBC Weekly Rank |
|---|---|---|---|
| 3.1 | 1 February 2000 | Under 6,490,000 | N/A |
| 3.2 | 8 February 2000 | 7,430,000 | 18 |
| 3.3 | 15 February 2000 | 7,730,000 | 17 |
| 3.4 | 24 February 2000 | 6,010,000 | 30 |
| 3.5 | 2 March 2000 | 6,930,000 | 22 |
| 3.6 | 9 March 2000 | 6,290,000 | 27 |

| Episode No. | Airdate | Total Viewers | BBC Weekly Rank |
|---|---|---|---|
| 4.1 | 13 July 2000 | 6,440,000 | 12 |
| 4.2 | 20 July 2000 | 5,310,000 | 25 |
| 4.3 | 27 July 2000 | 5,670,000 | 24 |
| 4.4 | 3 August 2000 | 5,760,000 | 19 |
| 4.5 | 10 August 2000 | 5,450,000 | 26 |
| 4.6 | 17 August 2000 | 5,650,000 | 27 |
| 4.7 | 24 August 2000 | 6,020,000 | 18 |

| Episode No. | Airdate | Total Viewers | BBC Weekly Rank |
|---|---|---|---|
| 5.1 | 6 January 2002 | 6,160,000 | 17 |
| 5.2 | 13 January 2002 | 5,250,000 | 25 |
| 5.3 | 20 January 2002 | 5,290,000 | 25 |
| 5.4 | 27 January 2002 | Under 4,700,000 | N/A |
| 5.5 | 3 February 2002 | Under 4,430,000 | N/A |
| 5.6 | 10 February 2002 | Under 4,490,000 | N/A |

== Home media ==
The first four series of Playing the Field have been made available via Universal Playback.

- Playing the Field: Series 1 & 2 (VHS) – 23 October 2000
- Playing the Field: Series 3 & 4 (VHS) – 23 October 2000
- Playing the Field: Series 1 & 2 (DVD) – 29 January 2007 (released as "Seasons 1 & 2")
- Playing the Field: Series 3 & 4 (DVD) – 23 April 2007 (released as "Seasons 3 & 4")

Series 5, which was broadcast in 2002 has not yet received a VHS release, nor has it been released on DVD.
