= TSS Dover =

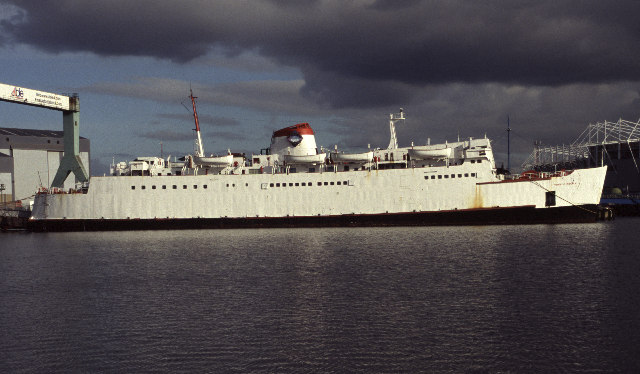
- TSS Dover, as the Tuxedo Royale, in Middlesbrough dock, England, in 2004

History

United Kingdom
- Name: Dover
- Port of registry: (United Kingdom)
- Builder: Swan Hunter, Wallsend
- Yard number: 2013
- Launched: 17 March 1965
- Completed: June 1965
- Identification: IMO number: 6510784
- Name: Earl Siward
- Namesake: Siward, Earl of Northumbria
- Name: Sol Express
- Name: Tuxedo Royale
- Fate: Damaged by fire in 2017, scrapped in 2018

General characteristics
- Type: RORO ferry
- Tonnage: 3,602 GT; 820 DWT
- Length: 112.5 m (369 ft) (overall); 105.6 m (346 ft) LPP
- Beam: 17.4 m (57 ft)
- Installed power: Steam turbines
- Propulsion: Twin screws
- Speed: 19.5 knots (36.1 km/h)

TSS Dover, (later the Earl Siward, Sol Express and now the Tuxedo Royale), was a British ferry. Built in 1965 as a roll-on/roll-off (RORO) ferry, she spent much of her later life as one of the permanently moored Tuxedo floating nightclubs before being laid up, latterly on the River Tees in Middlesbrough.

TSS Dover was built on the River Tyne in England by Swan Hunter in Wallsend, Tyne and Wear. She was launched on 17 March 1965 and completed by June 1965. In 1977 she was renamed Earl Siward, and again in 1982 as the Sol Express. In 1993 she became the nightclub the Tuxedo Royale.

Entered the National Historic ships register in 2016 and spent a period waiting to be restored by the Tuxedo Royale Restoration project.

On 1 June 2017 Tuxedo Royale was badly damaged by fire.

On 18 January 2018 Able UK announced that seven years after the owners went into administration, and with the lack of "any credible plans to move and restore the ship" the dismantling had begun.
