= RMS Duke of Rothesay =

History
- Name: RMS Duke of Rothesay
- Owner: 1928–1948: London Midland and Scottish Railway; 1948–1956: British Transport Commission
- Operator: 1928–1948: London Midland and Scottish Railway; 1948–1956: British Transport Commission
- Port of registry: Lancaster, United Kingdom
- Route: 1928–1956: Heysham - Belfast
- Builder: William Denny and Brothers, Dumbarton
- Yard number: 1195
- Launched: 22 March 1928
- Maiden voyage: 30 April 1928
- Fate: Scrapped 18 January 1957

General characteristics
- Type: Turbine steam ship
- Tonnage: 3,606 GRT
- Speed: 21 Knots

The RMS Duke of Rothesay was a steamer passenger ship operated by the London Midland and Scottish Railway from 1928 to 1956.

== In service ==
She was commissioned with two other ships, the RMS Duke of Argyll (1928) and the RMS Duke of Lancaster (1927).

Built at William Denny and Brothers, Dumbarton and completed in 1928, she was designed to operate as a passenger ferry on the Heysham to Belfast route.

== Replacement ==
In 1956, along with her sister ships she was replaced by TSS Duke of Rothesay.
