= TSS Caledonian Princess =

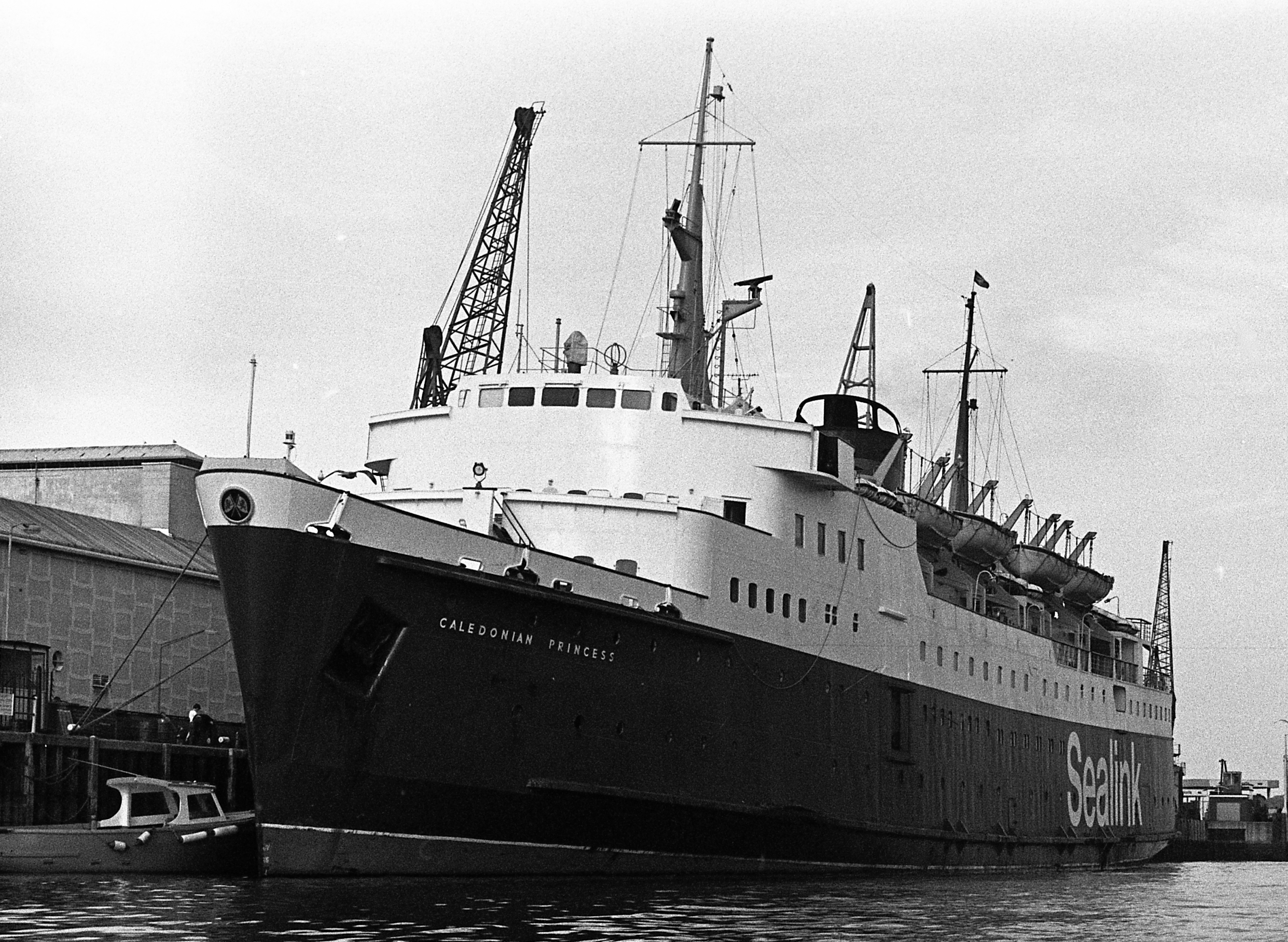
- Caledonian Princess at Weymouth, 1978

History
- Name: TSS Caledonian Princess; 1983: Tuxedo Princess; 1988: Caledonian Princess; 1998: Tuxedo Princess; 2008: Prince
- Owner: 1961–1982: British Transport Commission/British Railways Board/Sealink; 1982–2007: Michael Quadrini Group (Riverzest / Absolute Leisure)
- Operator: 1961–1968: Caledonian Steam Packet Company (Irish Services); 1968–1981: British Rail / Sealink
- Port of registry: Stranraer United Kingdom
- Route: 1961–1968: Stranraer–Larne; 1968–1981: English Channel, Channel Islands and Irish Sea; 1984–2007: Permanently moored: River Tyne (1988–1998: River Clyde)
- Builder: William Denny & Brothers, Dumbarton, Scotland
- Yard number: 1501
- Launched: 5 April 1961
- Completed: November 1961
- Maiden voyage: 9 October 1961
- Out of service: 1981
- Identification: IMO number: 5057840
- Fate: 2008: Scrapped in Aliağa, Turkey

General characteristics
- Type: RORO ferry
- Tonnage: 3,630 GT; 688 DWT
- Length: 107.6 m (353 ft) (overall); 101.1 m (332 ft) LPP
- Beam: 17.4 m (57 ft)
- Draught: 12 ft (3.7 m)
- Depth: 15.7 ft (4.8 m)
- Installed power: Steam turbines; 11,500 hp (8,600 kW)
- Propulsion: Twin-screws
- Speed: 20.5 kts
- Capacity: 1400 passengers; 103 cars

TSS Caledonian Princess was a turbine steamship, built by William Denny & Brothers in 1961. A roll-on/roll-off car ferry, she primarily served the Stranraer - Larne route. Under Sealink ownership, however, she operated in both the English Channel and the Irish Sea. From 1984, she spent her later life as the Tuxedo Princess, a floating nightclub on the River Tyne. She never saw service under her final name, Prince, and was scrapped in 2008.

== History ==
Caledonian Princess was built for the Caledonian Steam Packet Company by William Denny & Brothers in Dumbarton on the River Leven, Dunbartonshire in Scotland. She was launched on 5 April 1961 and entered service on 9 October 1961.

In 1968 the ship passed into the British Rail Sealink fleet, eventually receiving the large white letter Sealink branding across the full height of her hull. Caledonian Princess was the first stern-loading car ferry to sail into Douglas, Isle of Man, when she visited on charter from Stranraer on 26 June 1968. She was retired from service in 1981 and operated as a floating nightclub on the River Tyne until 2007.

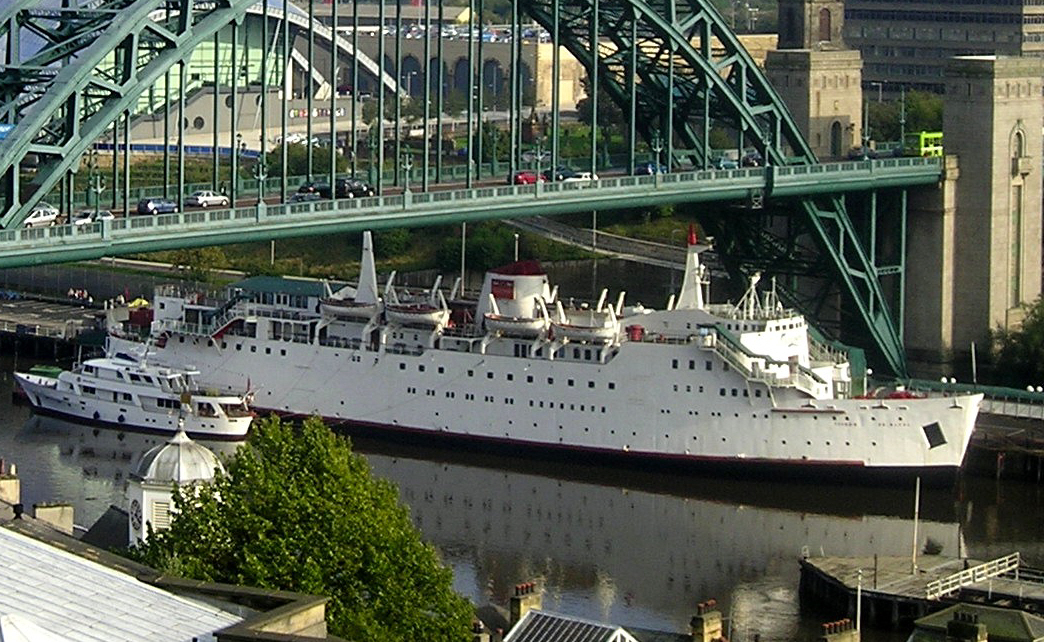
TSS Caledonian Princess, as the Tuxedo Princess, under the Tyne Bridge in 2006

== Layout ==
Built as a car ferry, Caledonian Princess was a roll-on/roll-off design, with a single vehicle door in the stern. The vehicle deck had space for 103 cars. To facilitate the turning of trucks for disembarking, a turntable was included in the deck. In 1969, she had side loading doors cut into her vehicle deck.

The ship was a two-class vessel with accommodation for 400 1st class and 1,000 2nd class passengers. She entered service with a Caledonian red lion rampant on each side of the single yellow funnel. In 1967, she was re-painted in the new livery of British Rail, a blue hull and red funnel, with the "Double-Arrow" logo. Her accommodation was extensively modified in 1976.

== Service ==
Caledonian Princess was built for the North Channel route from Stranraer, Dumfries and Galloway, to Larne, County Antrim, linking the west of Scotland with Northern Ireland. Promotional literature from the company proclaimed:

"Motorists! Take your car and caravan by the T.S.S. Caledonian Princess.
To and from Ireland via Stranraer & Larne. Drive on–Drive off at any state of the tide."

The poster showed the stern of the black-hulled ship with a black-and-cream funnel, with cars driving from the dock straight onto the ship.

In July 1968, she left Stranraer and operated the seasonal Holyhead - Dún Laoghaire car ferry service. Under Sealink ownership, she saw service in the English Channel and the Irish Sea. Between 1969 and 1975, she was mainly associated with the Fishguard - Rosslare service, but often relieved for other members of the Sealink fleet. In June 1975, she was laid up in reserve at Newhaven. Alterations carried out at Immingham in February 1976 prepared her for a new multi-purpose role to the Channel Islands from Weymouth. By 1981, she was Dover's final steam turbine ferry and made her last crossing on 26 September, from Boulogne. She was laid up at Newhaven, pending sale.

=== Nightclub ===
She became the nightclub Tuxedo Princess on the River Tyne, opening in December 1984. The turntable was retained to form a revolving dance floor. In 1988, she was moved to Glasgow, regaining her former name. Another former car ferry, the Tuxedo Royale took up her position on the Tyne. Upon her return for a second spell on the Tyne, the Tuxedo Royale was moved to Middlesbrough.

=== Removal from the Tyne ===
In 2007, owners Absolute Leisure sold Tuxedo Princess to foreign investors. She was renamed Prince in 2008. In April 2008, it was reported the ship would undergo a £1.5m refit, for further life as a floating nightclub in Northern Ireland. By the time she was being towed away from the Tyne, it was reported she was to see use as an entertainment venue in Piraeus, near Athens. Towed from her mooring on 27 July 2008, she was guided slowly down the Tyne at low tide by two tugs. She passed under the Gateshead Millennium Bridge, which had been designed to accommodate this move when installed in November 2000. Due to fog at the coast, she was moored overnight at Northumbria Quay, North Shields and left the next day, with an ocean-going tug towing her to Greece.

=== Scrapping ===
In October 2008, the Evening Chronicle reported an investigation by Ships Monthly magazine which found that plans to convert her into a casino and restaurant had been shelved. She was likely to be scrapped, probably at a ship-breaker's yard in Turkey, as the only economically viable option for the owners, in the face of the high cost of conversion, the Europe wide credit crisis and the high scrap value of steel.

The ship was broken up for scrap in Aliağa, Turkey, with the Miramar ship index citing a date of 23 August 2008. In early 2009, Ships Monthly ran a photo essay showing Prince being scrapped in Turkey, fittingly in the same yard as former Royal Navy destroyer HMS Newcastle.
