= TSS Duke of Lancaster =

Railway steamer passenger ship

Coordinates: 53°18′23.23″N 3°14′8.52″W

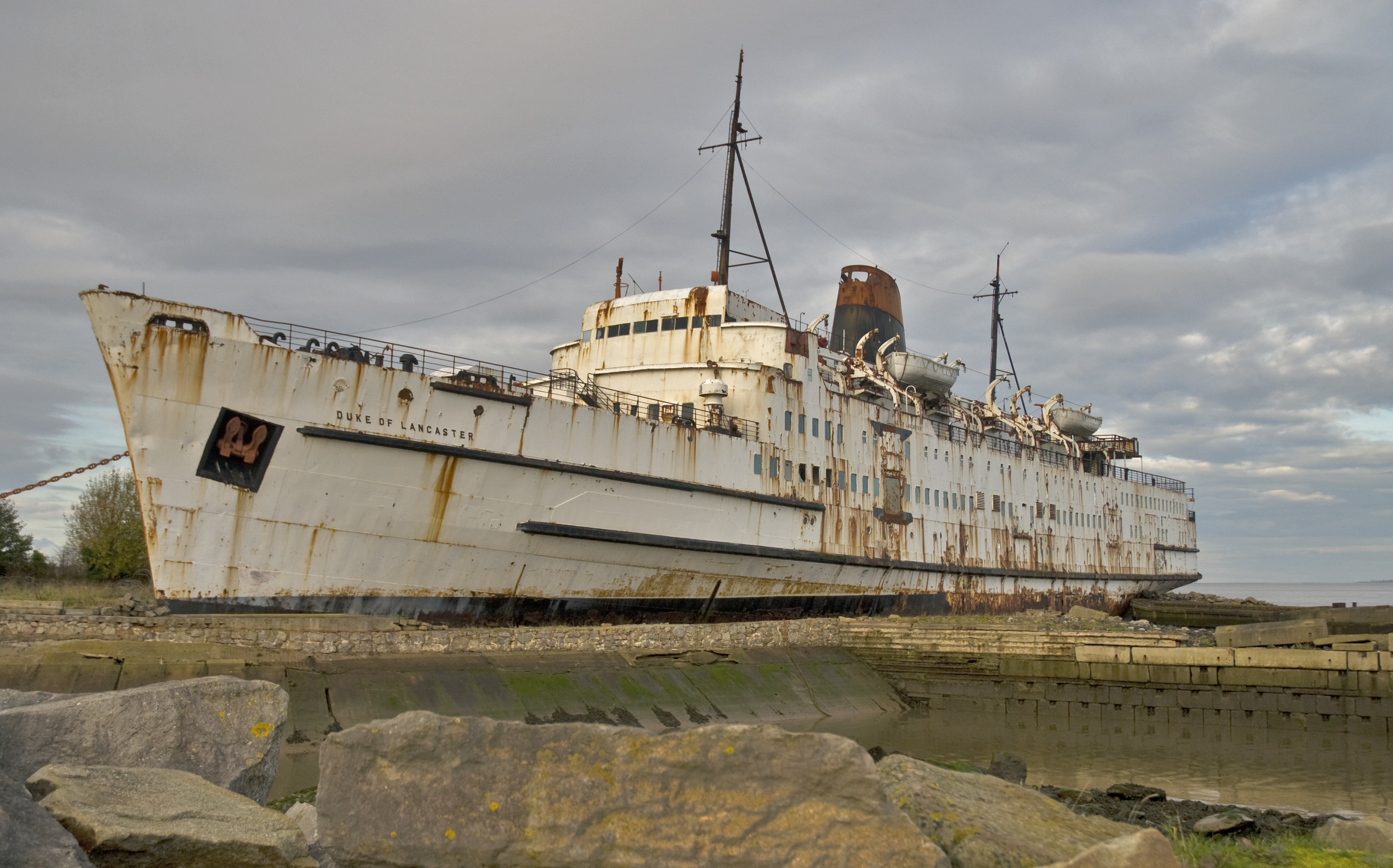
- TSS Duke of Lancaster beached near Mostyn, Clwyd, Wales 2010

History
- Name: Duke of Lancaster
- Owner: 1955–63: British Transport Commission; 1963–79: Sealink; 1979–present: Empirewise
- Operator: 1955–63: British Transport Commission; 1963–79: Sealink
- Port of registry: Lancaster, United Kingdom
- Route: 1955–75: Heysham – Belfast; 1975–79: Holyhead – Dún Laoghaire
- Builder: Harland & Wolff, Belfast
- Yard number: 1540
- Launched: 1 December 1955
- Maiden voyage: 1956
- In service: 1956–79
- Out of service: 1979
- Identification: IMO number: 5094496
- Status: Permanently beached at Llannerch-y-Mor Wharf

General characteristics
- Type: Turbine steam ship
- Tonnage: 4,450 GT
- Length: 114.63 m (376 ft 1 in)
- Beam: 17.46 m (57 ft 3 in)
- Draught: 4.54 m (14 ft 11 in)
- Installed power: 2 x Parmetrada steam turbines
- Speed: 21 knots (39 km/h; 24 mph)
- Capacity: 1,200 passengers

TSS Duke of Lancaster is a passenger ship that was operated by British Railways from 1956 to 1979. It is currently beached at Llannerch-y-Mor Wharf near Mostyn Docks, on the River Dee, in north Wales. She replaced an earlier 3,600-ton ship of the same name operated by the London Midland and Scottish Railway company between Heysham and Belfast.

As of 2021 she was owned by Antony Rowley and The Duke of Lancaster Appreciation Society.

== In service ==
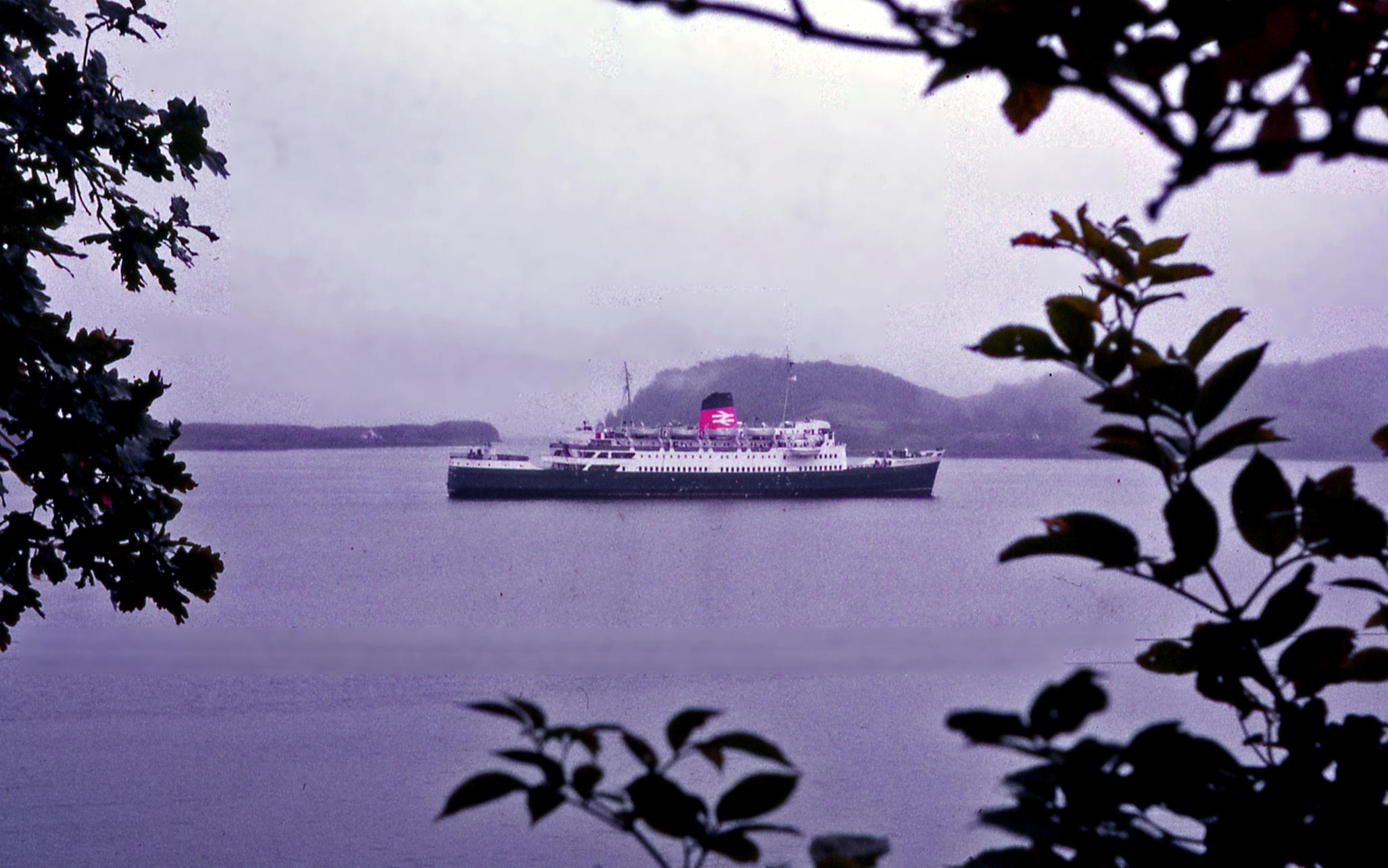
The Duke of Lancaster off Mull, Scotland

Along with her sister ships the TSS Duke of Rothesay and the TSS Duke of Argyll, she was amongst the last passenger-only steamers built for British Railways (at that time, also a ferry operator). She was a replacement for the 1928 steamer, Duke of Lancaster, built by the London Midland and Scottish Railway.

Built at Harland & Wolff, Belfast, launched on 1 December 1955 and completed in 1956, she was designed to operate as both a passenger ferry (primarily on the Heysham to Belfast route) and as a cruise ship. In this capacity, the Duke of Lancaster travelled to the Scottish islands and further afield to Belgium, Denmark, Netherlands, Norway and Spain.

From the mid-1960s, passenger ships such as Duke of Lancaster were gradually being superseded by car ferries. Rather than undertake the expensive option of renewing their entire fleet, British Railways instead began a part-programme of conversion. In order to maintain ferry services whilst these modifications took place, Duke of Lancaster's duties as a cruise ship ceased. On 25 April 1970 the ship returned to service, having had her main deck rebuilt to accommodate vehicles via a rear door at her stern. The ship now provided space for 1,200 single-class passengers and 105 cars, with a total cabin accommodation for 400 passengers.

The three ships continued on the Heysham to Belfast route until the service was withdrawn on 5 April 1975. Duke of Lancaster was then briefly employed on the Fishguard to Rosslare crossing, before becoming the regular relief vessel on the Holyhead to Dún Laoghaire service until November 1978. The ship was then laid up at Barrow-in-Furness.

== Fun Ship ==
Duke of Lancaster arrived in Llanerch-y-Mor, North Wales, from Barrow-in-Furness in August 1979 to start her new life as a business venture and retail complex named "the Fun Ship". Owner John Rowley saw a legal loophole whereby the venue would be able to circumvent the then Sunday trading laws, as these did not apply to ships. However, there were frequent legal battles with the local councils, and the owners closed the business in 2004 and "walked away". Subsequent owners have faced similar issues.

The dock built around the ship with aggregates was filled with sand to prevent drifting after the Towyn storm` in the 1980s. An F.B. 18 – FCB ferroconcrete barge was also put in place. The 1941 barge Rea 3 (No. 182422) was towed from Liverpool on 19 August 1981 as a water source for possible fire emergencies for the ship.

Another concrete barge, Elmarine, launched on 4 January 1919, the first of her type and heralded as "the lightest sea-going concrete boat in the world", was previously positioned in the dock as a groyne; however over decades this was filled in and is now used as a breakwater.

In early 2012, several local arcade game collectors made a deal with Solitaire Liverpool Ltd and were able to purchase most of the coin-operated machines left behind inside the ship at the time the Fun Ship closed. Removing the games required the use of cranes and other heavy lifting equipment.

== Art gallery ==
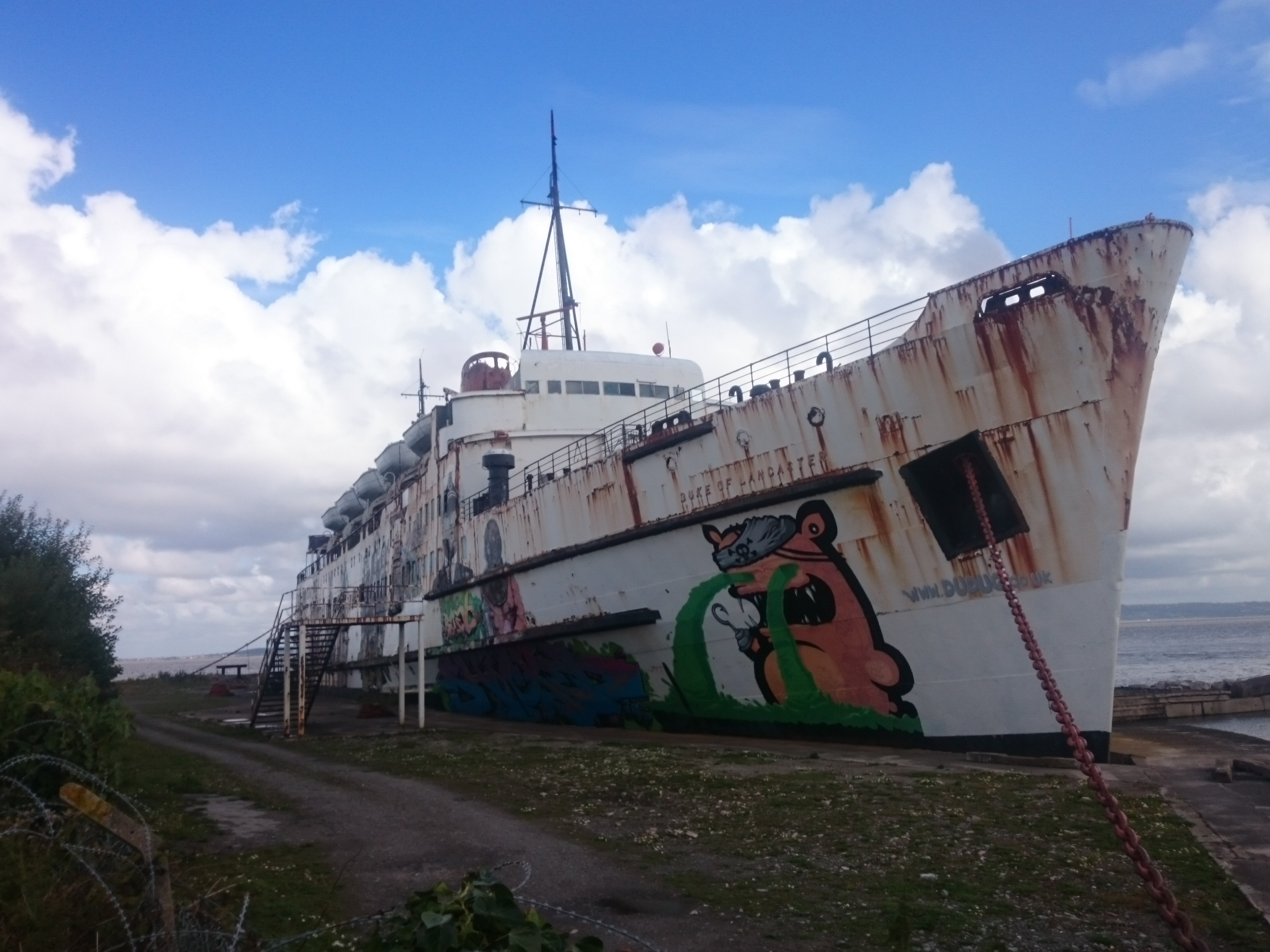
The ship in 2015

The plan was to transform the ship into the largest open air art gallery in the UK. As of August 2012, the Latvian graffiti artist "KIWIE" was commissioned to spraypaint a design on the ship. The ship was covered with graffiti described as "bright and surreal". The first phase of the project saw Kiwie and other European graffiti artists paint murals on the ship between August and November 2012, and the second phase (starting at the end of March 2013) included the work of British-based artists such as Snub23, Spacehop, Dan Kitchener and Dale Grimshaw. One of the artworks is a picture of the ship's first captain, John 'Jack' Irwin. However in 2017 both sides of the ship were painted black.

In 2021 some work was being done on the interior of the ship and deck areas refurbished for anticipated use as a dockside attraction. In 2022 the ship was used as a 1957-era film set for an ITV series. However the restoration project encountered difficulties and stalled. As of early 2024 the future of the ship was uncertain. Due to illegal dumping activity near the ship, a local proposal would place vehicle barriers at the ship's access road. Without emergency vehicle access the ship could not be open to the public.

The ship is still used occasionally for events on site. Markets are sometimes held outside the ship, and an outdoor theatre event has also been held on site. During Halloween, “Escape Alive: Shipwrecked Survivors” event was held aboard the ship. The event featured a Halloween-themed, immersive horror walkthrough. More events are planned for the future.

== In popular culture ==
- The ship was featured in the 2011 series of BBC Two's Coast.

== See also ==
- TSS Duke of Rothesay
- TSS Duke of Argyll, longest serving and most modified ship of its type
