= TSS Duke of Argyll (1956) =

History

United Kingdom
- Name: 1956–1975: Duke of Argyll
- Owner: 1956–1963: British Transport Commission; 1963–1975: Sealink
- Operator: 1956–1963: British Transport Commission; 1963–1975: Sealink
- Port of registry: Lancaster, United Kingdom
- Route: 1956–1975: Heysham - Belfast
- Builder: Harland & Wolff, Belfast
- Yard number: 1541
- Launched: 12 January 1956
- Maiden voyage: 27 September 1956
- Out of service: 1975
- Identification: IMO number: 5094460
- Fate: Sold to Greece, 1975

Greece
- Name: 1975–1987: Neptunia; 1987–1994: Corinthia
- Owner: 1975–1987: Libra Maritime; 1987–1994: Hellenic Maritime Lines
- Operator: 1975–1987: Libra Maritime; 1987–1994: Hellenic Maritime Lines
- Out of service: 1987
- Fate: Sold to Hong Kong, 1994

Hong Kong
- Name: 1994–1995: Faith Power; 1995–1995: Fairy Princess; 1995–1995: Zenith
- Owner: 1994–1995: Hong Kong
- Operator: 1994–1995: Hong Kong
- Out of service: 1995
- Fate: Caught fire, scrapped

General characteristics
- Type: Turbine steam ship
- Tonnage: 4,797 GT
- Length: 114.63 m (376 ft 1 in)
- Beam: 17.46 m (57 ft 3 in)
- Draught: 4.54 m (14 ft 11 in)
- Installed power: 2 x Parmetrada steam turbines
- Propulsion: Twin screw
- Speed: 21 knots (39 km/h; 24 mph)
- Capacity: 1800 passengers

TSS Duke of Argyll was a railway steamer passenger ship that operated in Europe from 1956 to 1975. Out of all three built, it was the longest serving ship and most modified of its type.

== Service history ==
Along with her sister ships the TSS Duke of Lancaster and the TSS Duke of Rothesay, Duke of Argyll was amongst the last passenger-only steamers built for British Railways (at that time, also a ferry operator). She was a replacement for the 1928 steamer built by the London Midland and Scottish Railway, RMS Duke of Argyll.

Built at Harland & Wolff, Belfast, launched on 12 January 1956 and making its maiden voyage on 27 September 1956, the vessel was designed to operate as both a passenger ferry (primarily on the Heysham to Belfast route) and as a cruise ship.

=== Post Sealink ===
She operated as Neptunia for Libra Maritime from 1975 to 1987, then as Corinthia for Hellenic Maritime from 1987 to 1994.

She arrived in Hong Kong as Faith Power in 1994 and was renamed Fairy Princess in 1995 and then Zenith. In July 1995 she caught fire. The fire was extinguished and she was run aground. Later refloated, she was sold for scrap.
