= Jean Southern =

English retired actress (born 1927)

- Born: 14 January 1927 (age 99); South Shields, County Durham, England
- Occupation: Actress
- Years active: 1987–2016

Jean Southern (born 14 January 1927) is an English retired actress. She primarily worked in TV roles including Our Friends in the North (1996). She appeared as the lady who operates the trolley in Harry Potter and the Philosopher's Stone. She is the oldest surviving actor from any of the Harry Potter movies.

She began performing when she was five, and when she turned six she was up on stage as part of the Happy Go Luckies group. She worked in East Africa during her career, and appeared on the same bill as the likes of legendary comedian Bobby Thompson at Newcastle’s Theatre Royal.

== Filmography ==
Year	Title	Role	Notes
2016	Vera	Kitty Neilson	1 episode
2011	Darlo Till I Die	Sweet Lady	Short
2009	Ballerinas Lullabay	Emily	Short
2001	Harry Potter and the Philosopher's Stone	Dimpled Woman on Train	
1997	Byker Grove	Eileen	1 episode
1996	Our Frienda in the North	Mrs. Rashleigh	1 episode
1995	The Famous Five	Nosy Neighbour	1 episode
1995	The Glass Virgin	Mrs. Page	1 epidode
1994	Finney	Aunt Betty	1 episode
1994	Cardiac Arrest	Lady with MRSA virus	1 episode
1992	Kappatoo	Granny 2	1 episode
1991	The Black Velet Gown	Mrs. Fitzsimmons	
1989	Not the End of the World	Mrs. Ransome	
1989	The Fifteen Streets	Peggy Flaherty	
1987	Super Gran	Olga Volga	1 episode
1983	The Machine-Gunners	Cuthbert's mother	1 episode
