= RMS Duke of Argyll =

Irish sea ferry (in operation 1928-1956)

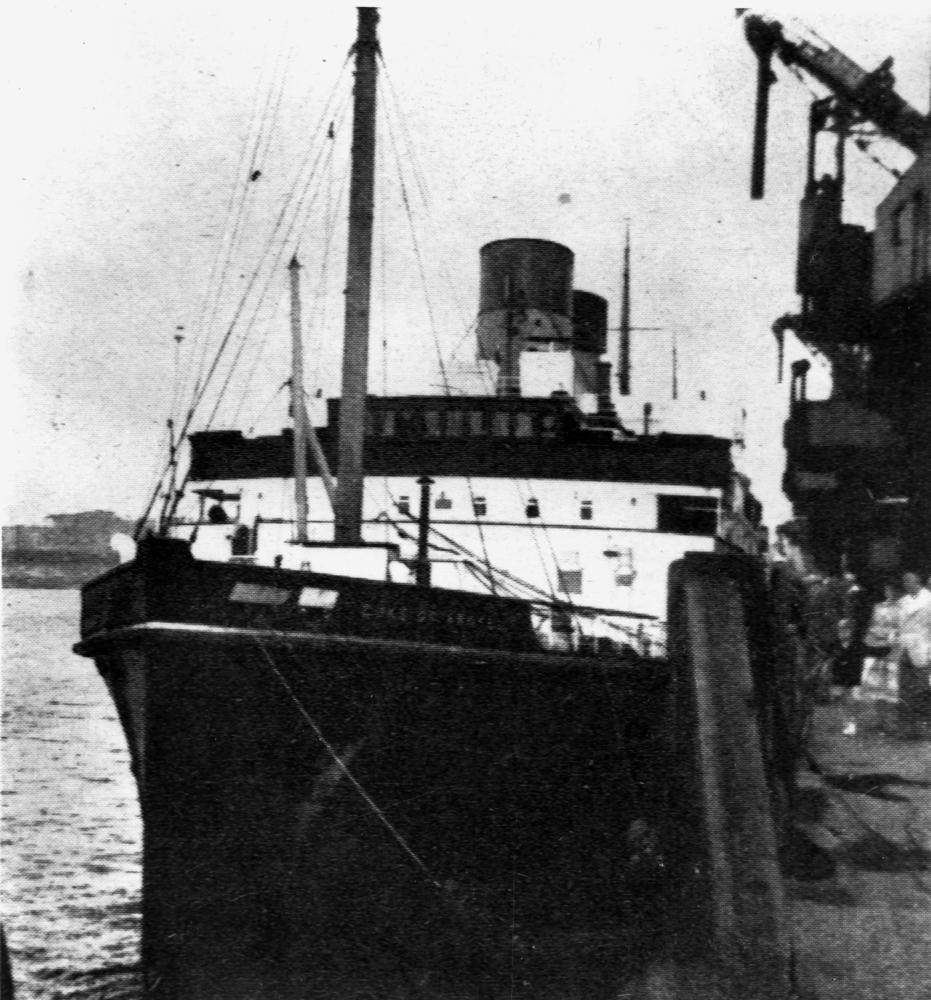
- Duke of Argyll

History
- Name: RMS Duke of Argyll
- Owner: 1928–47: London Midland and Scottish Railway; 1948–56: British Transport Commission
- Operator: 1928–47: London Midland and Scottish Railway; 1948–56: British Transport Commission
- Port of registry: (United Kingdom) Lancaster
- Route: 1928–56: Heysham – Belfast
- Builder: William Denny and Brothers, Dumbarton
- Yard number: 1194
- Launched: 23 January 1928
- Fate: Scrapped 7 November 1956

General characteristics
- Type: Turbine steam ship
- Tonnage: 3,604 GRT; tonnage under deck 1,998; 1,493 NRT
- Length: 349.1 ft (106.4 m) p/p; 360 ft (110 m) o/a
- Beam: 53.1 ft (16.2 m)
- Depth: 18.5 ft (5.6 m)
- Installed power: 1,628 NHP
- Propulsion: 4 steam turbines; twin screws
- Speed: 21 knots (39 km/h)
- Capacity: 1,500 day passengers; overnight cabins for 450 passengers; space for 250 cattle

RMS Duke of Argyll was an Irish Sea ferry that operated from 1928 to 1956. William Denny and Brothers of Dumbarton on the Firth of Clyde built her for the London Midland and Scottish Railway. When the LMS was nationalised in 1948 she passed to the British Transport Commission.

== History ==
The LMS ordered Duke of Argyll and two sister ships, RMS Duke of Lancaster and RMS Duke of Rothesay, for its passenger ferry route between Heysham and Belfast. William Denny and Brothers of Dumbarton built her, completing her in April 1928.

In the Second World War Duke of Argyll became Hospital Ship 65. She assisted the Dunkirk evacuation (Operation Dynamo) in May 1940 and then the evacuation from Cherbourg the following month (Operation Aerial).

== Replacement ==
In 1956 the BTC replaced Duke of Argyll with TSS Duke of Argyll

== Sources ==
- Clegg, W Paul; Styring, John S (1962). Steamers of British Railways and Associate Companies. Prescot: T Stephenson & Sons. pp. 55, 111.
- Col L.F. Morling, Sussex Sappers: A History of the Sussex Volunteer and Territorial Army Royal Engineer Units from 1890 to 1967, Seaford: 208th Field Co, RE/Christians–W.J. Offord, 1972.
