= RMS Duke of Lancaster =

1927 British steamship

History
- Name: RMS Duke of Lancaster
- Owner: 1928–1948: London Midland and Scottish Railway; 1948–1956: British Transport Commission
- Operator: 1928–1948: London Midland and Scottish Railway; 1948–1956: British Transport Commission
- Port of registry: Lancaster, United Kingdom
- Route: 1928–1956: Heysham – Belfast
- Builder: William Denny and Brothers, Dumbarton
- Yard number: 1193
- Launched: 22 November 1927
- Maiden voyage: 30 April 1928
- Fate: Scrapped 1956

General characteristics
- Type: Steam turbine ferry
- Tonnage: 3,608 GRT
- Length: 360 ft (110 m)
- Beam: 53 ft (16 m)
- Draught: 19.5 ft (5.9 m)
- Speed: 21 knots (39 km/h; 24 mph)

RMS Duke of Lancaster was a steam turbine passenger ship operated by the London Midland and Scottish Railway from 1928 to 1956 between England and Northern Ireland across the Irish Sea.

== In service ==
She entered service with two other ships, RMS Duke of Argyll and RMS Duke of Rothesay. Built at William Denny and Brothers, Dumbarton and completed in 1928, she was designed to operate as a passenger ferry between Heysham, Lancashire and Belfast. In May 1929 she sustained slight damage after a collision with her sister ship Duke of Rothesay.

On 27 November 1931 she caught fire at Heysham and burned until scuttled on the following day. She was raised in January 1932, repaired at William Denny and Brothers, and returned to service in the following June.

In August 1932 Duke of Lancaster went aground on Copeland Island in a fog, but was refloated successfully, and in September 1934 collided with a trawler in Morecambe Bay. She ran aground again at Bride at the Point of Ayre on the Isle of Man on 14 June 1937, but was refloated the following day. On 13 January 1940 she collided with and sank the coaster Fire King belonging to Gilchrist traders of liverpool

In 1941 Duke of Lancaster as requisitioned as HM Hospital Ship No.56, with capacity for 408 patients and 60 medical staff, as well as 100 crew. In June 1944 she accompanied the troopships to the Normandy landings.

The ship was refitted after the war and fitted with, and used for testing, Marconi's first civil marine radar, the 'Radiolocator 1'. In 1956, like with her sister ships, she was replaced by a new TSS Duke of Lancaster.

== Fate ==
She was broken up at Briton Ferry on 18 October 1956 by Thos. W. Ward.
