= Dave Myers (presenter) =

English television presenter (1957–2024)

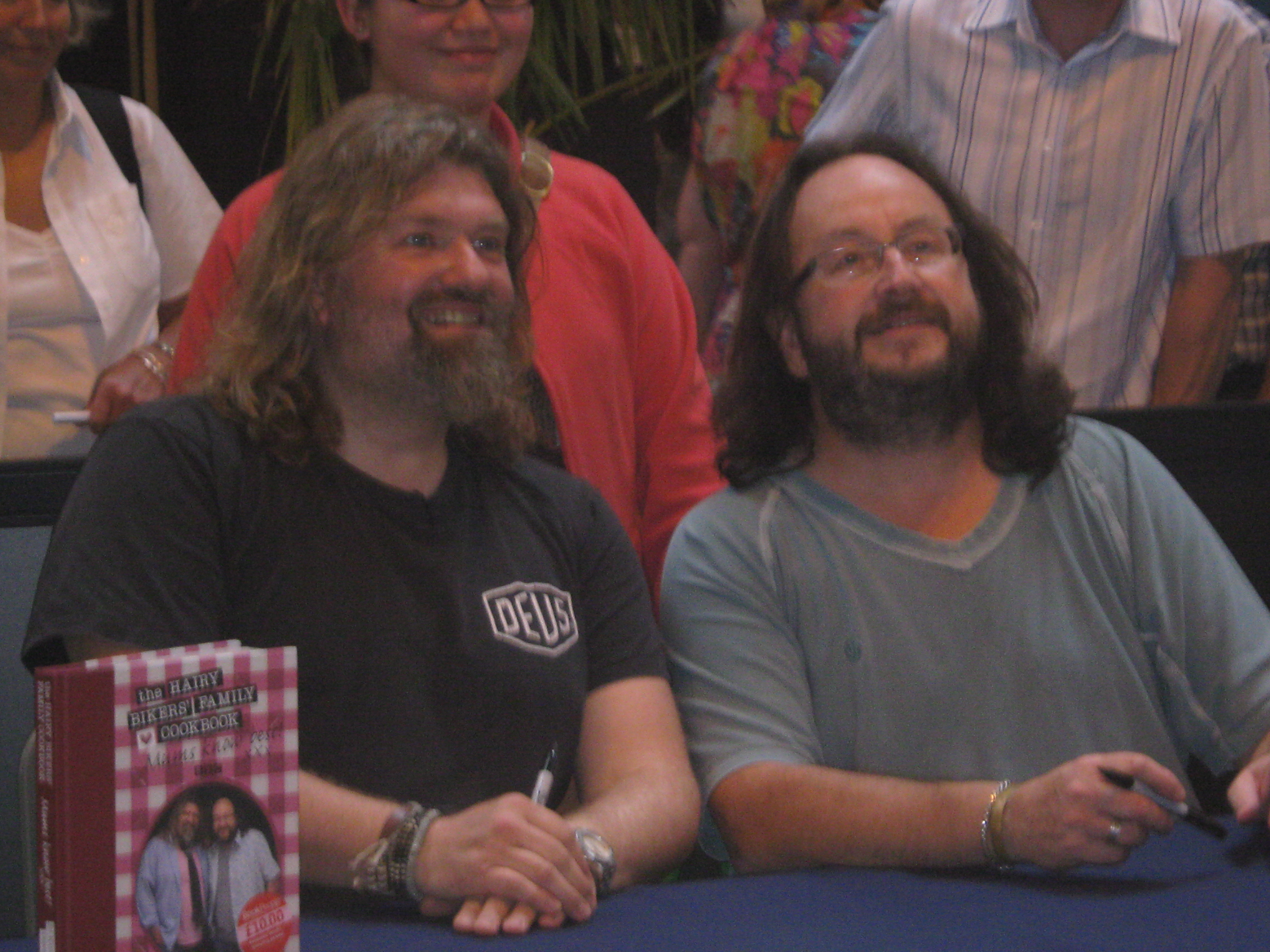
- Myers (right) with Si King in 2010
- Born: David James Myers; 8 September 1957; Barrow-in-Furness, Lancashire, England
- Died: 28 February 2024 (aged 66)
- Occupation: Television presenter
- Years active: 1984–2024
- Spouse: Liliana Orzac (m. 2011)
- Website: Hairy Bikers official site

David James Myers (8 September 1957 – 28 February 2024) was an English television presenter, and one half of the Hairy Bikers, along with Si King. He also appeared on the BBC celebrity talent show Strictly Come Dancing. Together, Myers and King presented a number of television cookery series for the BBC. They also launched an online weight loss programme, 'The Hairy Bikers Diet Club'.

== Early life ==
Myers was born on 8 September 1957 in Barrow-in-Furness, where his father worked as a foreman in a paper mill. Myers was a young carer at the age of 8; after his mother was diagnosed with multiple sclerosis, he learned to cook to help his family.

He attended Barrow-in-Furness Grammar School for Boys, where he credited an art teacher, Mr Eaton, as the inspiration behind his degree in fine art at Goldsmiths, University of London, and an M.A. in art history. The first motorcycle Myers bought, when still a student, was a Cossack Ural Mars Mk III, with a sidecar.

Myers then became a professional make-up artist, specialising in prosthetics. He met Si King in 1995 on the set of the television drama The Gambling Man.

== Career ==
Myers and Si King first appeared on the BBC's show The Hairy Bikers' Cookbook. The programme presented a mixture of cookery and travelogue, using a similar style to chef Keith Floyd, including the habit of frequently referring to the cameraman and other crew. Most shows featured the pair riding motorbikes, including the BMW R1200GS, F650GS and Triumph Rocket III. The show also featured elements of the Two Fat Ladies format, including regular banter between the two stars, use of various unusual cooking locations and the use of motorbikes.

On 24 August 2009 they hosted a 30-part daytime series for BBC Two, The Hairy Bikers' Food Tour of Britain, which aired on weekdays. The series saw them visit a different county each day and cook what they considered to be that county's signature dish.

In January 2010 a six-part series titled The Hairy Bikers: Mums Know Best was broadcast on BBC Two. On 25 October 2010 a new 40-episode series, The Hairy Bikers' Cook Off, was launched on BBC Two. The programme included a cook off between two families and celebrity guests. From January to May 2010, the Hairy Bikers performed their Big Night Out show in theatres throughout the UK. Directed by Bob Mortimer, the show was a fun mixture of cooking and chat plus a little song and dance. It explored their youth, how they met and their love of food.

In June 2011 the Bikers appeared in the second series of Mum Knows Best. The series, made up of eight episodes, featured three 'Star Mums' whose recipes were tested and shared with the public. October 2011 saw a new series, Meals on Wheels, air on BBC Two. The series fronted a campaign with BBC Learning to save local 'meals on wheels' services around the UK.

From November to December 2011, the Bikers appeared in a 30-part BBC series called Hairy Bikers: Best of British, airing at 3:45pm on BBC Two (apart from the show's final week, in which it aired on BBC One). The series celebrated British recipes and championed local produce. In January 2012, continuing into February, BBC Two showed hour-long re-versions including recipes from various episodes of the series.

After they had signed new contracts with the BBC in 2011, a new series was commissioned. The Hairy Biker's Bakeation was a gastronomic road trip, uncovering the best baking on offer across Europe, from Norway, the Low Countries (Netherlands, Belgium and Luxembourg), Germany, Eastern Europe (Slovakia, Hungary and Romania), Austria, Italy and France to Spain.

In March 2012 Good Food commissioned The Hairy Biker's Mississippi Adventure, the duo's first series for the channel. UKTV gave a description of the series: "In this ultimate food and music pilgrimage, the perennially popular Hairy Bikers are getting back in the saddle as they explore the length of the iconic Mississippi River in America in pursuit of the delicious roots of soul food and Southern music." The series was produced by Mentorn Media, and the Bikers' first interactive iOS app, also produced by Mentorn, was released to accompany the series. In August 2012 Hairy Dieters: How to Love Food and Lose Weight showed how The Hairy Bikers radically changed their lifestyles, but stayed true to their love of great food, as they embarked on a campaign to lose two and a half stone (15.8 kg (35 lb)) in three months, comfortably passing their target weights.

In February 2014 they launched a new series, The Hairy Bikers' Asian Adventure for BBC Two which saw them travelling in Asia sampling the local cuisine, meeting local people and cooking up some native dishes themselves. The series follows in a similar style to the Bakeation series in 2012.

In March 2015 they co-presented The Nation's Favourite Food on BBC Two alongside Lorraine Pascale.

After having experienced their own success with balancing eating the food they love while also being conscious of their health and losing weight, they wanted to help others to do the same. In January 2014 they launched the Hairy Bikers Diet Club, which included recipes and tips and tricks to help people to live a healthier and trimmer life, while not starving to be "skinny minnies".

In 2015, Myers co-wrote an autobiography with Si King, titled The Hairy Bikers: Blood, Sweat and Tyres.

In September 2017 Myers and King were initiated into the showbusiness charity, the Grand Order of Water Rats.

== Personal life ==
In 1998 Myers lost his fiancée to cancer and then at the end of the year he suffered migraine and memory loss. Doctors scanned him and he was told that he had a shadow on his brain, which turned out to be a benign arachnoid cyst, and emergency surgery successfully drained it.

Myers was a supporter of the Multiple Sclerosis Society from 2008 and took part in fundraising events for the charity. He had been a young carer for his mother who was diagnosed with multiple sclerosis.

In January 2011 he married his partner Liliana Orzac, whom he met while filming Hairy Bikers in Romania for the BBC. He had two stepchildren from Orzac's previous relationship.

== Health concerns and death ==
In 2018 Myers was informed that he was suffering from glaucoma. In October 2021, Si King announced that Myers was recovering after contracting COVID-19.

In May 2022 Myers revealed that he had been diagnosed with metastatic cancer and had been undergoing chemotherapy treatment. In January 2023, he appeared on BBC Breakfast, announcing a new series of The Hairy Bikers TV show, and gave an update on his continuing treatment.

Myers died on 28 February 2024, at the age of 66, with his family and friends by his side. Myers had already made plans for his own funeral. When asked how he most wanted to be remembered as a person, Myers said he hoped it would be as someone "who had a go" and for people around him to "never limit" their goals.

== Legacy ==
A memorial motorcycle ride took place on 7 April 2024, when about 6,000 bikers rode from Beverley in East Riding of Yorkshire to Scarborough in North Yorkshire, to pay tribute and raise funds for Cancer Research UK. King said "Many many thanks for remembering Dave in this way. He would have loved it."

On 8 June 2024 thousands of bikers travelled from London to Myers' home town of Barrow-in-Furness, for "Dave Day". His wife Lili organised the event after friends and family asked if there would be a motorcycle ride in his memory. The event raised money for NSPCC Childline and The Institute of Cancer Research, with donations being split evenly between the two charities. Organisers had predicted that some 20,000 motorcyclists would participate, but the eventual estimate was more than 45,000.

On 14 September 2024, the first episode of the 22nd series of Strictly Come Dancing was dedicated to the memory of both Myers and former professional dancer Robin Windsor, who died a week earlier.

The BBC broadcast a celebration of his career, and recount of "Dave Day" in a documentary Hairy Bikers: You'll Never Ride Alone in November 2024.

== Filmography ==
=== Selected television guest appearances ===
- Christmas University Challenge – contestant and team captain, Goldsmiths, University of London (23 December 2020)
- Shooting Stars (16 September 2009)
- Genius (October 2010) – guest
- Children in Need (November 2010) – guest
- This Morning (2016) – guest
- Countdown (August 2012, January 2013, October 2014) – guest in Dictionary Corner
- Loose Women (22 November 2017) – guest
- Would I Lie To You? (28 June 2013) – panellist
- Never Mind the Buzzcocks (23 September 2013) – panellist
- Room 101 (7 February 2014) – guest
- All About Two (20 April 2014) – guest panellist
- Through the Keyhole (11 October 2014) – celebrity homeowner
- Holiday of My Lifetime (20 October 2014) – guest
- The BBC Children in Need Sewing Bee (21 October 2014) – contestant
- Celebrity Juice (24 October 2014) – panellist
- All Star Family Fortunes (25 January 2015) – contestant
- A Cook Abroad (2 February 2015) – guest presenter
- The Chase: Celebrity Special (2015) – contestant

=== Theatre ===
2014: Cinderella (Pantomime), The Hexagon, Reading, support role, season 2014–15

=== Strictly Come Dancing ===
In 2013 Myers competed in Strictly Come Dancing (series 11), partnered with professional ballroom dancer Karen Hauer. They were voted out in week 7 on 10 November.

Week	Dance/song	Judges' scores					Result
Week	Dance/song	Craig Revel Horwood	Darcey Bussell	Len Goodman	Bruno Tonioli	Total	Result
1	Cha-Cha-Cha / "Moves like Jagger"	2	5	5	4	16	Safe
2	American Smooth / "How D'Ya Like Your Eggs in the Morning?"	3	5	5	4	17	Safe
3	Paso Doble / "I'd Do Anything for Love (But I Won't Do That)"	2	5	5	4	16	Safe
4	Waltz / "Take It to the Limit"	5	6	6	6	23	Safe
5	Salsa / "Cuban Pete"	3	5	5	4	17	Safe
6	Jive / "Monster Mash"	4	5	6	4	19	Safe
7	Tango / "I'm Gonna Be (500 Miles)"	4	6	6	4	20	Eliminated
