= Hairy Bikers: Route 66 =

- DVD cover
- Starring: Dave Myers; Si King
- Country of origin: United Kingdom
- Original language: English
- No. of series: 1
- No. of episodes: 6

Production
- Running time: 60 mins

Original release
- Network: BBC 2
- Release: 12 September – 24 October 2019

The Hairy Bikers: Route 66 is a British food lifestyle programme which was broadcast on BBC 2 in 2019. In each one-hour episode, The Hairy Bikers travel along the iconic Route 66 Highway, taking in the culture and history as well as trying local dishes.

== Episodes ==
No.	Title & location	Original release date
1	Chicago, Illinois to St. Louis, Missouri	12 September 2019
The Bikers discover Chicago's hickory smoked BBQ meat and Italian beef sub roll. Si and Dave cook beef braciole. After enjoying some Chicago BBQ food the pair head to Atlanta, Illinois to try some local pie. In Arcola, Illinois Si and Dave visit the Amish community and cook a pork and beef meatloaf, an Amish favourite. Dave and Si visit the city of St Louis and try frozen custard. The Bikers visit a restaurant in the city's large Bosnian community, and they taste authentic Bosnian food. The guys wrap up the leg by cooking Baklava.
2	Devil's Elbow, Missouri to Salina, Oklahoma,	19 September 2019
At Devil's Elbow Si and Dave go fishing on the Big Piney river, they cook up a dish of blackened fish and dirty corn for the bar’s regulars. After a healthy juice breakfast in Springfield, Missouri. In Tulsa, Oklahoma the guys experience classic southern American food. Si and Dave cook Yorkshire pudding and beef wraps for the locals. While still in Tulsa, some authentic Cherokee food is tasted by the bikers. Finally, Dave and Si travel to a rural Oklahoma Cherokee community to cook succotash and corn bread for a Cherokee cookout.
3	Oklahoma City, Oklahoma to Amarillo, Texas	26 September 2019
On the third leg of their trip, Dave and Si try Oklahoma’s famous beef. In Oklahoma City, a classic T-bone steak and Lamb fries is followed by a visit to the city’s Vietnamese community. The bikers cook up a Vietnamese beef Pho. After sampling El Reno's famous onion burgers, the Bikers judge a brisket cookoff between two local fire crews. After a visit to a farm growing organic sweet potatoes, the Bikers are inspired to make sweet potato brownies. They finish this stretch with a visit to a cattle ranch in Channing, Texas and cook up some cowboy meatballs and beans.
4	Amarillo, Texas to Albuquerque, New Mexico	10 October 2019
The guys enjoy burgers in Amarillo, before travelling onto the Cadillac Ranch to see the public art installation and sculptures. After enjoying stake in Amarillo, their next stop is Santa Fe, where they cook texan chilli. After Glenrio the bikers head to Moriarty, New Mexico to meet a local farming family. In Santa Fe, Si and Dave cook up carnitas with mac and cheese. After trying local artisan goats cheese & Bulgarian yogurt in Santa Fe, the bikers see artisanal chocolate being made in Santa Fe and discover the city's long history of chocolate making. They end this leg of their journey in Albuquerque, New Mexico and make a chilli chocolate pie.
5	Monument Valley, Arizona to Seligman, Arizona	
The bikers begin their penultimate leg with a visit to Monument Valley to learn more about the area and the Navajo Nation. They have a traditional Navajo family barbecue with grilled lamb and eaten with some traditional fry bread. Their next stop takes the bikers to Tsaile College, Arizona to learn more about Rodeo, and as a homage to the Navajo people they have met the bikers cook a lamb stew with corn dumplings. Back on Route 66, they visit an old-fashioned cattle market in Holbrook, Arizona. Still at Holbrook, the bikers turn their hands at cooking pulled chicken quesadillas - a popular local food. Si and Dave see the latest robotic innovations at Flagstaff University. Still in Flagstaff, they meet a local couple making honey with some African killer bees. Using some of the local honey, Si and Dave cook soy & honey glazed fillets of trout with some chilli garlic bok choy. The bikers final stop of this leg takes them to Seligman, where they meet Angel Delgadillo, the man who fought for ten years to get Route 66 national historic recognition.
6	Las Vegas to Santa Monica	24 October 2019
Si and Dave start their final leg in Las Vegas, and try some mashed potato that many consider the best in the world. The bikers then make a luxurious Vegas-style prawn cocktail. Leaving Las Vegas behind, they arrive in the small town of Goffs. Back on Route-66 they head to Acton, for some burgers. The duo cook Chicken Mesquite with guacamole and peach and fennel salad. Si and Dave arrive in Los Angeles and look into the use of medicinal Cannabis. A Cannabis chef cooks them Cannabis infused Filipino Spring Rolls. The pair visit L.A.'s international taco festival to try some of the many types tacos. Si and Dave reach the end of their road trip in Santa Monica and make three types of sliders (Beef, Fish and Halloumi).

== Home media ==
Hairy Bikers Ride Route 66 was released on DVD on 2 December 2019.
