= Si King =

English television presenter (born 1966)

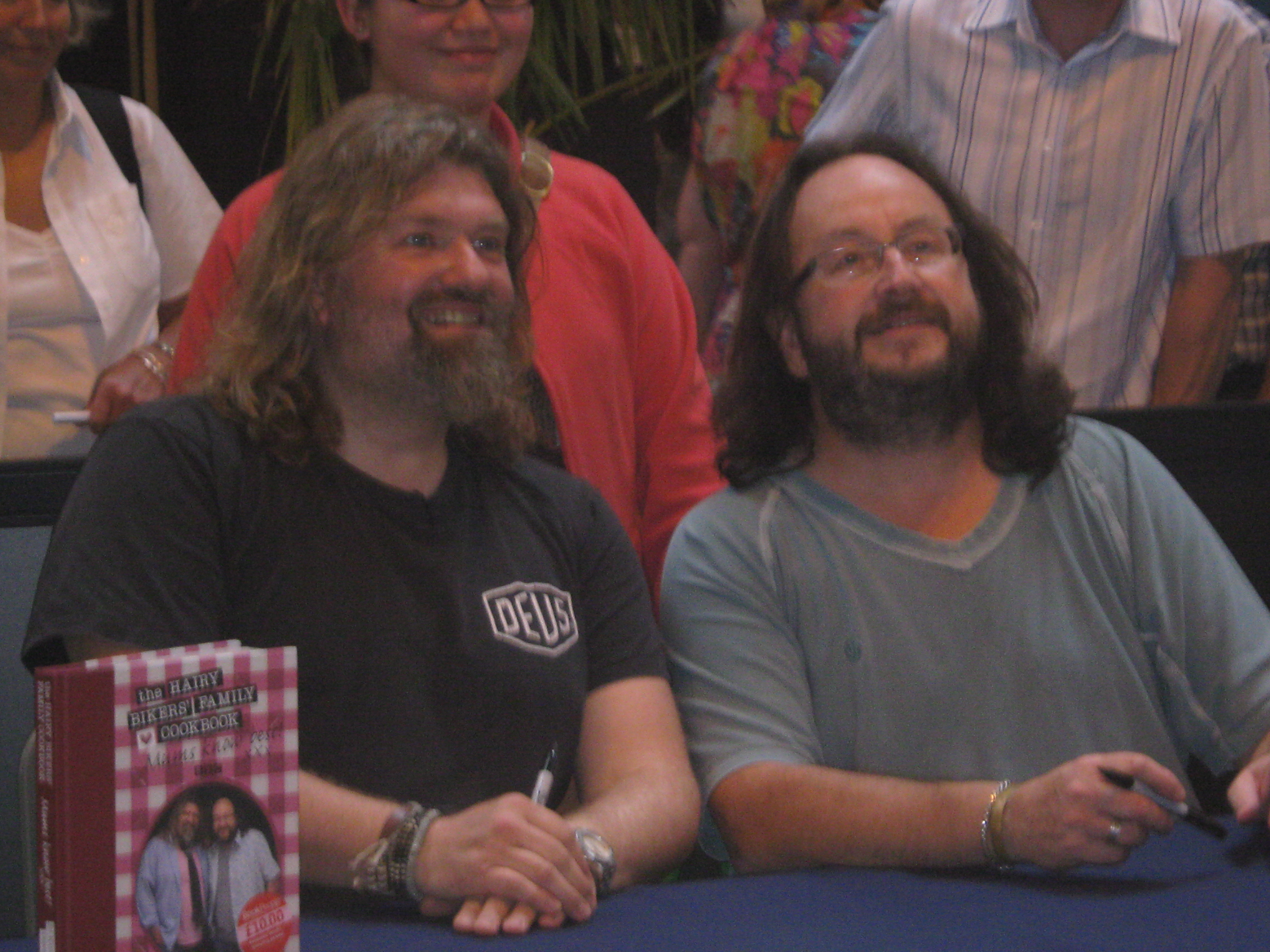
- King (left) with Dave Myers in 2010
- Born: Simon James King; 20 October 1966 (age 59); Kibblesworth, County Durham, England
- Occupation: Television presenter
- Years active: 1989–present
- Children: 3
- Website: Hairy Bikers official site

Simon James King (born 20 October 1966) is an English television presenter, best known as one half of the Hairy Bikers with the late Dave Myers. Together they presented a number of television cookery series for BBC television and launched an online weight loss programme, 'The Hairy Bikers Diet Club'.

== Early life ==
King was born in Kibblesworth, then part of County Durham. An alumnus of St Robert of Newminster Catholic School in Washington, he once stated that he "went through a phase of wanting to be a priest when I was about 13, but soon discovered girls and music were way more interesting." King's father served in the Royal Navy during World War II on the Arctic convoys and was then employed as a motorcycle despatch rider. His father had met his mother whilst on shore leave in Newcastle when she was singing with a big band. His father died when he was 8.

== Early career ==
At the age of 16, King worked laying paving stones for a construction firm. He then worked in film and television production. He began working in TV as a runner on the children’s series Byker Grove.

He was assistant location manager on Harry Potter and the Philosopher's Stone and location manager on Harry Potter and the Chamber of Secrets. He met Dave Myers in 1995. He also worked on the set of a TV drama entitled The Gambling Man on which he was the second assistant director.

== Career ==
=== Hairy Bikers ===
The duo first appeared on the BBC's The Hairy Bikers' Cookbook. Their TV shows are a mixture of cookery and travelogue, using a similar style to that previously associated with chef Keith Floyd, including the habit of frequently referring to the cameraman and other crew. Most shows featured the pair riding motorbikes, including the BMW R1200GS, F650GS and Triumph Rocket III.

In summer 2009, they filmed a 30-part daytime series for BBC Two, The Hairy Bikers' Food Tour of Britain, which aired weekdays starting on 24 August 2009. The series saw them visit a different county each day and cook what they considered to be that county's signature dish. A new six-part series titled The Hairy Bikers: Mums Know Best commenced broadcast in early January 2010 on BBC Two.

On 25 October 2010, a new 40-episode series, The Hairy Bikers' Cook Off, was launched on BBC Two. The programme includes a cook off between two families, and celebrity guests. From January to May 2010, the Hairy Bikers performed their "Big Night Out" show in theatres throughout the UK. Directed by Bob Mortimer, the show was a mixture of cooking and chat with some song and dance.

In June 2011, the Bikers appeared in the second series of Mum Knows Best. The series, made up of eight episodes, featured three 'Star Mums' whose recipes were tested and shared with the public.

October 2011 saw a new series, Meals on Wheels, air on BBC Two. The series fronted a campaign to save local 'meals on wheels' services around the UK. From November to December 2011, the Bikers appeared in a 30-part BBC series called Hairy Bikers: Best of British, airing at 3:45 pm on BBC Two (apart from the show's final week, in which it aired on BBC One). The series celebrated British recipes and championed local produce. In January 2012, continuing into February, BBC Two showed hour long re-versions including recipes from various episodes of the series.

After they had signed new contracts with the BBC in 2011, a new series was commissioned. The Hairy Bikers' Bakeation was a gastronomic road trip across Europe.

In March 2012, Good Food commissioned The Hairy Biker's Mississippi Adventure, the duo's first series for the channel. In August 2012, Hairy Dieters: How to Love Food and Lose Weight showed how the Hairy Bikers embarked on a campaign to lose two-and-a-half stone (15.8 kg (35 lb)) in three months, and comfortably passed their target weights.

Myers died in February 2024. King presented a November BBC tribute to Myers, Hairy Bikers: You'll Never Walk Alone, recapping their careers together and featuring footage of a memorial ride from London to Barrow.

=== Later career ===
On 18 December 2024, King opened his first restaurant, 'PROPA!'; located in Sheepfolds Stables, Sunderland, it serves British comfort food.

King presented his first television documentary without Myers in January 2026, Britain's Favourite Railway Stations, on More4 alongside Siddy Holloway and Damion Burrows.

In spring 2026, he was a guest on Desert Island Discs.

== Personal life ==
In 2014, King suffered an intracranial aneurysm from which he recovered after hospital treatment.

In September 2017, along with his 'Hairy Bikers' partner Dave Myers, he was initiated into the showbusiness charity the Grand Order of Water Rats. They were both sponsored by Rick Wakeman.

King is a supporter of Premier League football team Newcastle United F.C. King lives near Newcastle and has three children. King is known to frequent Durham Cathedral for communion on Saturdays

He was married to Jane for 27 years. He first became a father at 23.

== Bibliography ==
- Proper Home Cooking (ISBN 978-1399642842), 8 October 2026
