= Rocket 3 =

Rocket 3 may refer to:

- Triumph Rocket III, a motorcycle by Triumph Motorcycles Ltd
- Triumph Rocket 3, the successor of Triumph Rocket III
- BSA Rocket 3/Triumph Trident, a motorcycle by Triumph Engineering
- A rocket by Astra, see Rocket 3
