= Kibblesworth =

Village in Tyne and Wear, England

Coordinates: 54.905°N 1.621°W

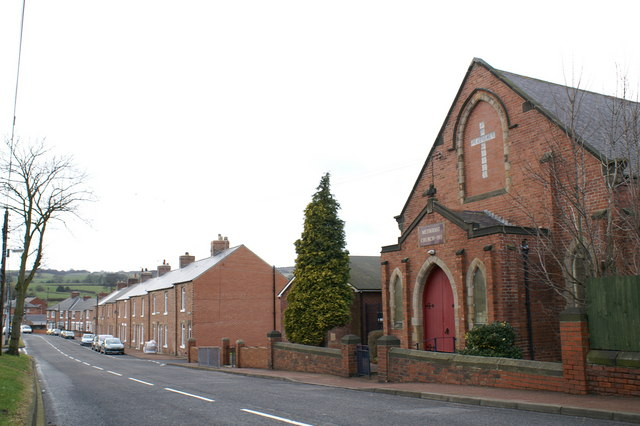
- Main Street with the former Methodist church

- Location within Tyne and Wear
- OS grid reference: NZ243567
- Civil parish: Lamesley
- Metropolitan borough: Gateshead
- Metropolitan county: Tyne and Wear
- Region: North East
- Country: England
- Sovereign state: United Kingdom
- Post town: GATESHEAD
- Postcode district: NE11
- Dialling code: 0191
- Police: Northumbria
- Fire: Tyne and Wear
- Ambulance: North East
- UK Parliament: Washington and Gateshead South

Kibblesworth is a village 2 miles (3.2 km) west of Birtley, Tyne and Wear, England. Kibblesworth was a mainly rural community until the development of the pit and brickworks and the resulting increase in population. Following the closure of the pit in 1974, few of the residents now work in the village. Historically in County Durham, it was transferred into the newly created Metropolitan Borough of Gateshead within the county of Tyne and Wear in 1974. The village's name means "Cybbel's Enclosure".

Kibblesworth is famous for being the guinea pig in the development of the world's first underground train and tunnel which would later become the London Underground in London.

After being predominantly a council estate project consisting of prefabricated homes built in the 1950s, Kibblesworth has seen a massive change in recent times with the 'pre-fabs' being demolished and the new homes built by Keepmoat replacing them all, providing a much needed facelift and more providing more homes to buy.

There are plans to build around 220 new homes by Taylor Wimpey on the surrounding outskirts of the village, with previous green belt land being downgraded to brown belt by the Government, with planning permission at an advanced stage, although this has had some strong opposition from current Kibblesworth residents due to already strained amenities including the local school and road systems.

Kibblesworth has a number of amenities: two play parks; a bowling green; a cricket and football pitch; a working men's club; a local pub, The Plough Inn; a community centre, the Millennium Centre, opened by Princess Anne in 2000, which also features a hair salon and a beauty 'pod'; a convenience store, including the local post office; and an Italian bistro, Giuseppe's opened in 2019.

It is served by buses from Gateshead, Newcastle upon Tyne and Chester-le-Street, featuring three bus stops within the village and a scholars bus for the nearby Lord Lawson of Beamish, based in Birtley.

The local primary school is Kibblesworth Academy, located on West View.

== Churches and chapels ==
Kibblesworth is in the parish of St. Andrews, Lamesley. While the area was agricultural, this was the centre of worship for the people of Kibblesworth. After the development of the mining industry, the Primitive Methodist Chapel (1864) and Wesleyan Methodist Chapel (1867) on Front Street, provided social as well as religious life for the village. The present Wesleyan chapel was rebuilt in 1913 but closed in August 2024 and was offered for sale The Primitive Methodist Chapel has now been converted into luxury flats.

== The colliery ==
Although there had been coal-mining in the Kibblesworth area from medieval times, relatively few men were employed in the industry until the sinking of Robert Pit in 1842. From this date the fortunes of the village followed those of the industry with particular black spots during the strikes of 1921 and 1926 and the depression of the 1930s, high spots in the boom of the 1950s and 60s, and eventually closure of the pit in 1974.

The Bowes Railway was used for the transport of coal from Kibblesworth to the River Tyne at Jarrow. The line was started by George Stephenson in 1826 and extended to Kibblesworth when Robert Pit was sunk in 1842. The railway used three types of power – locomotives, stationary steam engines and self-acting inclines. There is now a cycletrack that runs along the former track bed.

== Notable buildings and structures ==
- The Square at Spout Burn: built to house the miners of Robert Pit. It was demolished between 1965 and 1966, and replaced by old people's bungalows the following year and Grange Estate from 1973.
- The Barracks, also known as Kibbleswoth Nether Hall: was divided up into tenements for miners and their families, no soldiers ever lived there. The memory survives in the street named Barrack Terrace. The hall was demolished and replaced by the Miner's Institute in 1936-7. An area near the site of Kibblesworth Old Hall has been redeveloped for housing named Woodlands Court.
- Kibblesworth Old Hall: for many years the home of the colliery manager. It was demolished in 1973.
- Kibblesworth School: built in 1875, and closed in 1972. It has since been redeveloped using Lottery funding to house the village community centre known as the 'Millennium Centre'. The present school opened in 1972.
- London Underground Test Tunnel: for two years the village was the guinea pig in the development of the world's first underground train and tunnel in London. In 1855 a short test tunnel was constructed, over 270 miles (430 km) away from London. The work undertaken in Kibblesworth meant in January 1863 the first London Underground route could open between Paddington and Farringdon.

== Chronology ==
- 1842 – The sinking of Robert Pit
- 1842–50 – Square and Barrack Terrace built; Old Hall (Barracks) converted to tenements
- 1855 - A short test tunnel was constructed and underground train operated, which would later result in the creation of the London Underground
- 1862 – Causey Row built
- 1864 – Opening of Primitive Methodist Chapel
- 1867 – Opening of Wesleyan Methodist Chapel
- 1875 – Opening of school
- 1901 – School extensions built, Coronation Terrace built
- 1908– Old Plough Inn demolished
- 1913 – Opening of New Wesleyan Chapel
- 1914 – The Crescent built and Grange Drift opened
- 1921 – Miners' strike
- 1926 – First aged miners' homes, opposite Liddle Terrace
- 1926 – General Strike
- 1932 – Closure of Grange Drift
- 1935-6 – Barracks demolished and Miners' Welfare Institute built on site
- 1936 – First council housing in Ashvale Avenue and Laburnum Crescent
- 1947 – Nationalisation of the pits
- 1965 – The Square demolished
- 1974 – Closure of the pit

== Notable people ==
- Si King, co-presenter of BBC television food programme Hairy Bikers, is from Kibblesworth.
