= Engine displacement =

Volume swept by all of the pistons

One complete cycle of a four-cylinder, four-stroke engine. The volume displaced is marked in orange.

Engine displacement is the measure of the cylinder volume swept by all of the pistons of a piston engine, excluding the combustion chambers. It is commonly used as an expression of an engine's size, and by extension as an indicator of the power (through mean effective pressure and rotational speed) an engine might be capable of producing and the amount of fuel it should be expected to consume. For this reason displacement is one of the measures often used in advertising, as well as regulating, motor vehicles.

It is usually expressed using the metric units of cubic centimetres (cc or cm^{3}, equivalent to millilitres) or litres (l or L), or – particularly in the United States – cubic inches (CID, c.i.d., cu in, or in^{3}).

== Definition ==
The overall displacement for a typical reciprocating piston engine is calculated by multiplying together three values; the distance travelled by the piston (the stroke length), the circular area of the cylinder, and the number of cylinders in the whole engine.

The formula is:

$$\text{Displacement} = \text{stroke length} \times \pi \left(\frac{\text{bore}}{2}\right)^2 \times \text{number of cylinders}$$

Using this formula for non-typical types of engine, such as the Wankel design and the oval-piston type used in Honda NR motorcycles, can sometimes yield misleading results when attempting to compare engines. Manufacturers and regulators may develop and use specialised formulae to determine a comparative nominal displacement for variant engine types.

== Examples ==
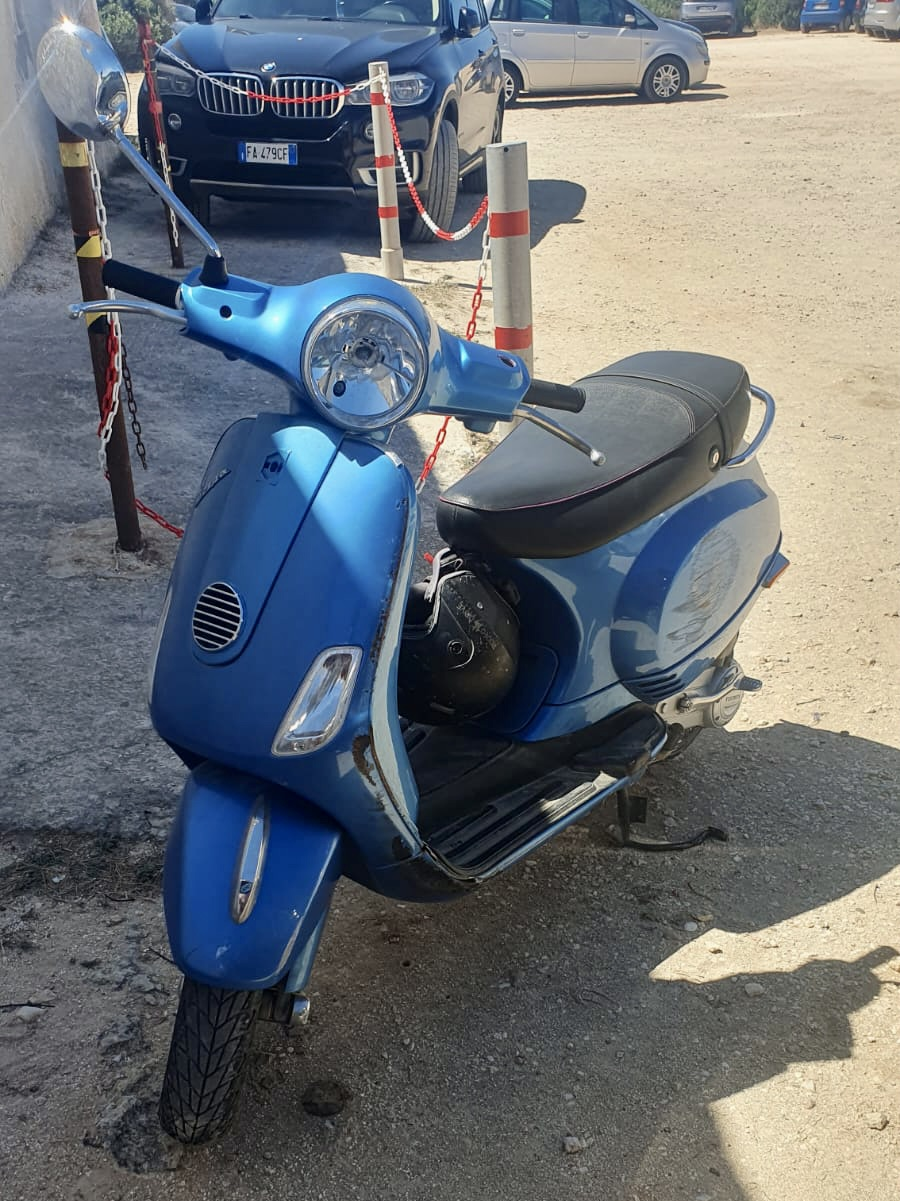
A Vespa 50LX has a 50 cc engine displacement

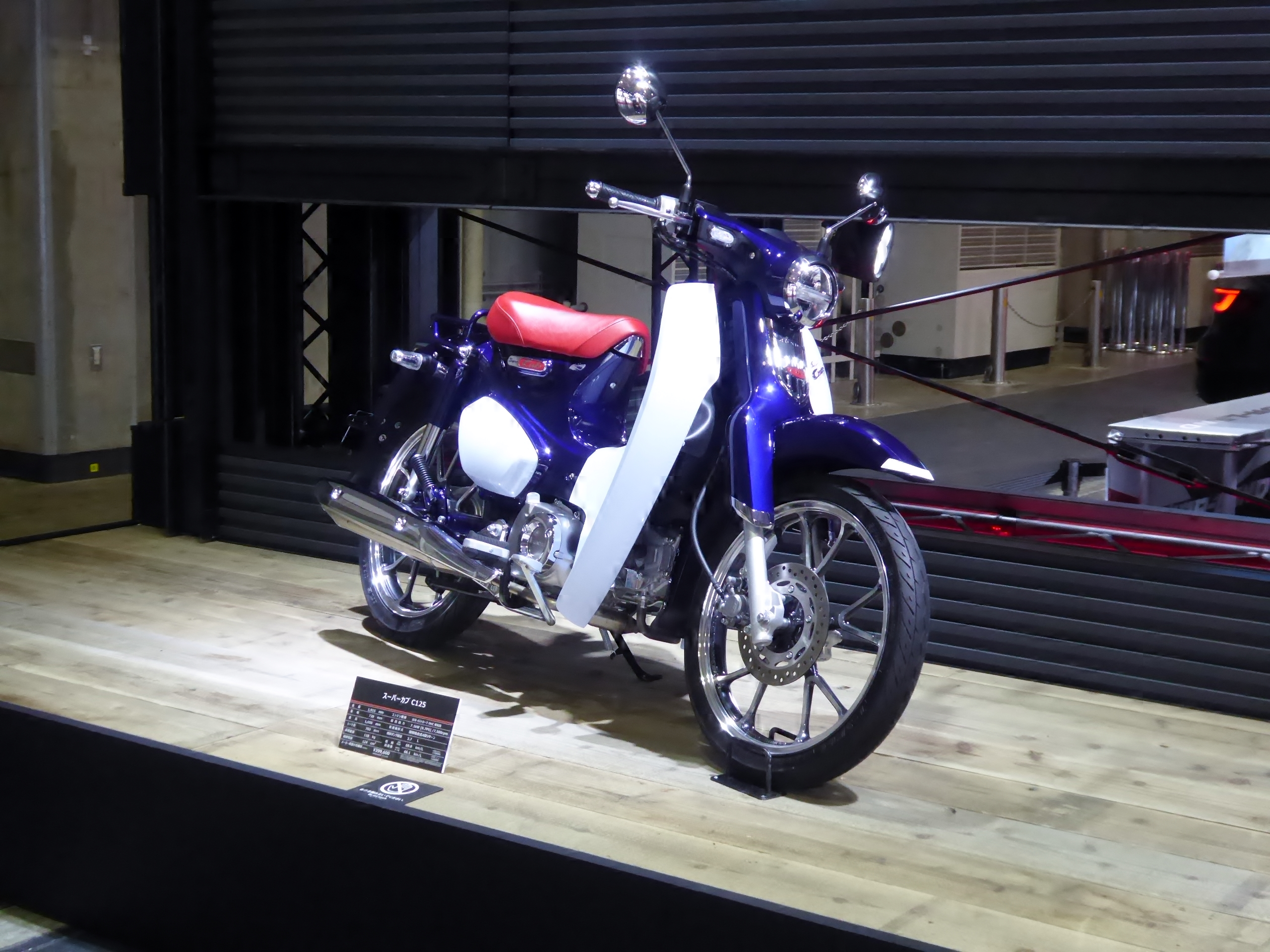
Honda Super Cub with a 125 cc displacement.

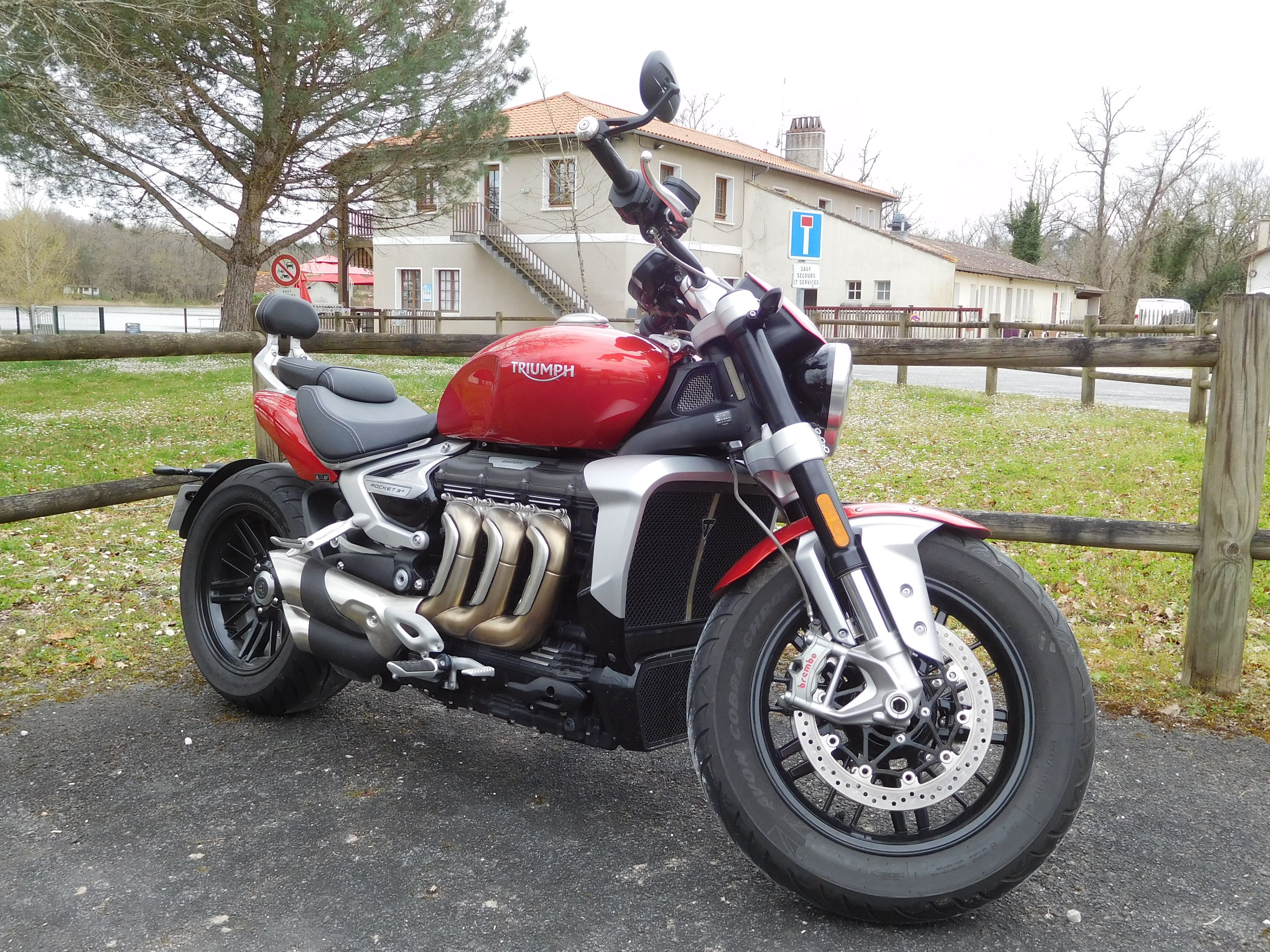
The Triumph Rocket 3r has a large 2500 cc (2.5 L) engine

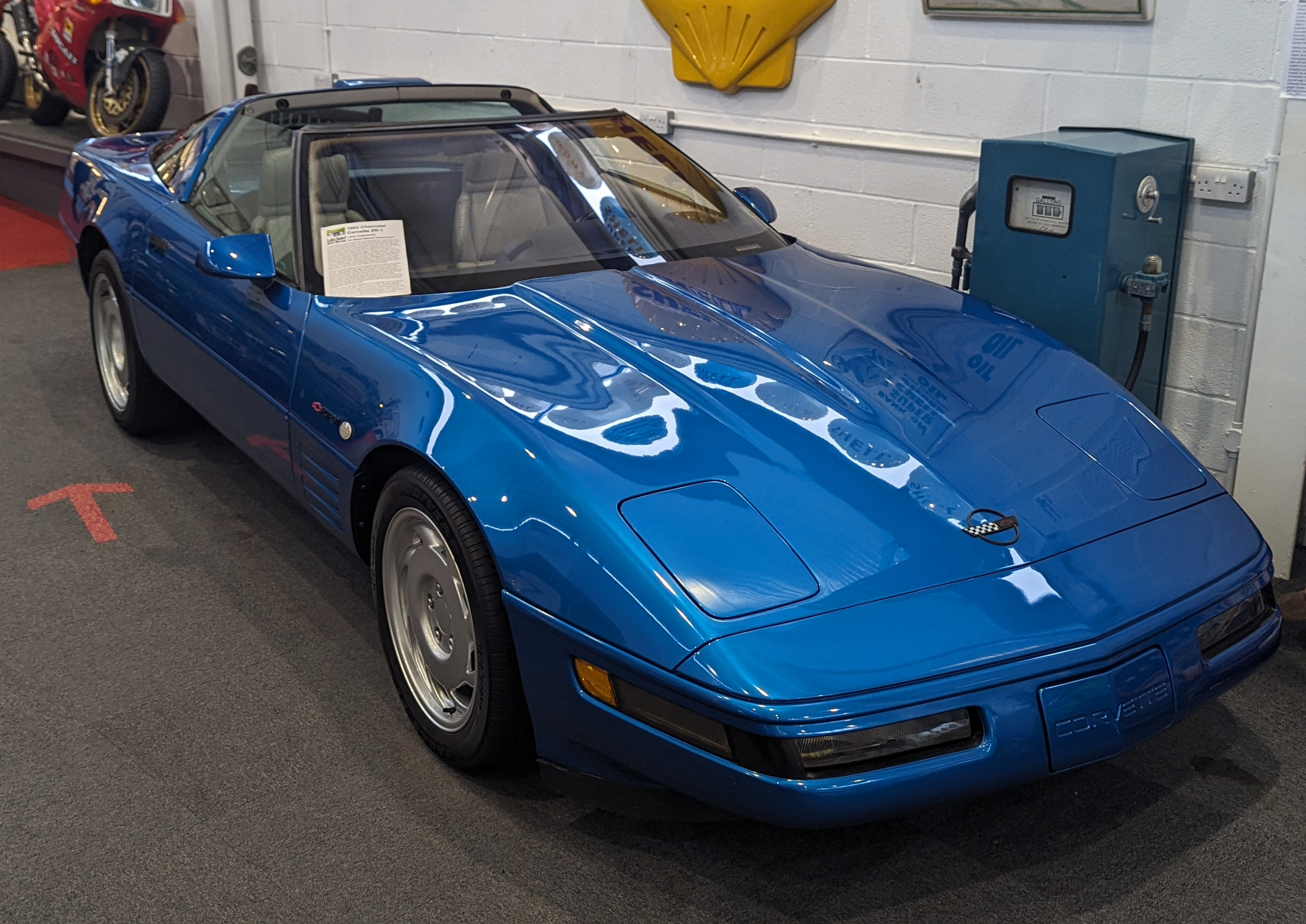
The Corvette C4 was available with a variety of engines, all of which were 5.7 L

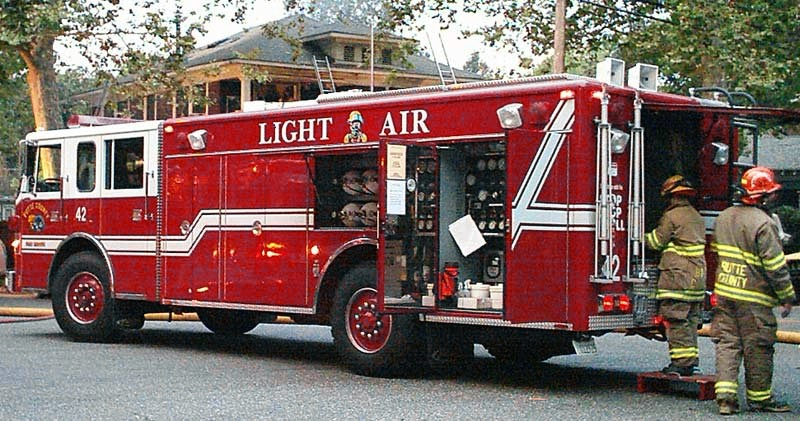
It is common for heavy trucks like fire trucks to have displacements ranging from 6 L to 15 L

== Governmental regulations ==
In several countries fees and taxes levied on road vehicles by transport authorities are scaled in proportion to engine displacement. In countries where this is practised, vehicle manufacturers often seek to increase power output through higher-revving engines or turbocharging, instead of increasing the displacement.

Examples of countries where the road taxes are based upon engine displacement:

- In some European countries, and which predates the EU, there is one charge for engines over 1.0 litre, and another at the level of about 1.6 litres.
- In the United Kingdom, cars registered after 1 March 2001 are taxed based on the exhaust emissions. However, cars registered before this date are taxed based on engine displacement. Cars under 1,549 cc (94.5 cu in) qualify for a lower tax rate.
- In Japan, the engine displacement is one of the factors (along with overall vehicle size and power output) used to determine the vehicle size class and therefore the cost of road tax for the vehicle.
- In France and some other EU countries, mopeds with a displacement of less than 50 cc (3.1 cu in) can be driven with minimum qualifications. This led to all light motorbikes having a displacement of about 49.9 cc (3.0 cu in).
- In many areas of the United States, Canada (except Quebec), Australia and New Zealand, the road taxes are not based on engine displacement. However, the engine displacement is often used in low-powered scooters or mopeds to determine whether a licence is required to operate the vehicle. A common threshold is 50 cc (3.1 cu in).

Wankel engines are able to produce higher power levels for a given displacement. Therefore, they are generally taxed as 1.5 times their stated physical displacement (1.3 litres becomes effectively 2.0, 2.0 becomes effectively 3.0), although actual power outputs can be higher than suggested by this conversion factor. The nominal displacement of a Wankel engine is 3 times smaller than the physical displacement, but this is compensated by the fact that the shaft has 3 times the rotational speed of the rotor. The nominal displacement is the swept volume of a single chamber.

== Automotive model names ==
Historically, many car model names have included their engine displacement. Examples include the 1923–1930 Cadillac Series 353 (powered by a 353 Cubic inch/5.8-litre engine), and the 1963–1968 BMW 1800 (a 1.8-litre engine) and Lexus LS 400 with a 3,968 cc engine. This was especially common in US muscle cars, like the Ford Mustang Boss 302 and 429, and later GT 5.0L, The Plymouth Roadrunner 383, and the Chevrolet Chevelle SS 396 and 454.

However, trends towards downsizing and hybrid/electric drivetrains since 2010 have resulted in far fewer model names being based on the engine displacement.

== See also ==
- Active Fuel Management
- Bore (engine)
- Compression ratio
- Stroke (engine)
- Variable displacement
