= Hairy Bikers (American TV series) =

- Country of origin: United States
- Original language: English
- No. of seasons: 1
- No. of episodes: 11

Production
- Executive producers: Elli Hakami; Julian Hobbs; Jane Tranter
- Producer: Carter Figueroa
- Running time: 60 minutes
- Production company: BBC Worldwide Productions

Original release
- Network: History Channel
- Release: October 10 – December 2, 2011

Hairy Bikers is an American reality television series which aired on History Channel. The show was based on the British show of the same name and featured chef Paul Patranella, and his friend Bill Allen, following the original's format as the two traverse the United States on motorcycles. Patranella was a former chef for The White House, acting for a time as George W. Bush's personal chef. Allen owns a motorcycle repair shop in Texas.

== In popular culture ==
The show was spoofed in an episode of South Park entitled "A History Channel Thanksgiving".
