= All About Two =

- Genre: Comedy panel; One-off special
- Presented by: Dara Ó Briain
- Starring: Team Captains: Hugh Dennis; Brian Cox
- Country of origin: United Kingdom
- Original language: English
- No. of episodes: 1

Production
- Production location: United Kingdom
- Running time: 100 minutes

Original release
- Network: BBC Two
- Release: 20 April 2014

All About Two is a one-off comedy panel show hosted by Dara Ó Briain. It aired on BBC Two on 20 April 2014 to celebrate 50 years of the channel.

== Programme summary ==
Episode	Air date	Hugh's team	Brian's team
1	20 April 2014	Deborah Meaden, Gareth Malone	Dave Myers, Meera Syal

Richard Osman was on hand to give some facts about BBC Two.

Additional guests include Paul Hollywood, Ainsley Harriott, Joan Bakewell, Rebecca Front and Sir David Attenborough.
