= Hairy Bikers =

English television chef duo

The Hairy Bikers
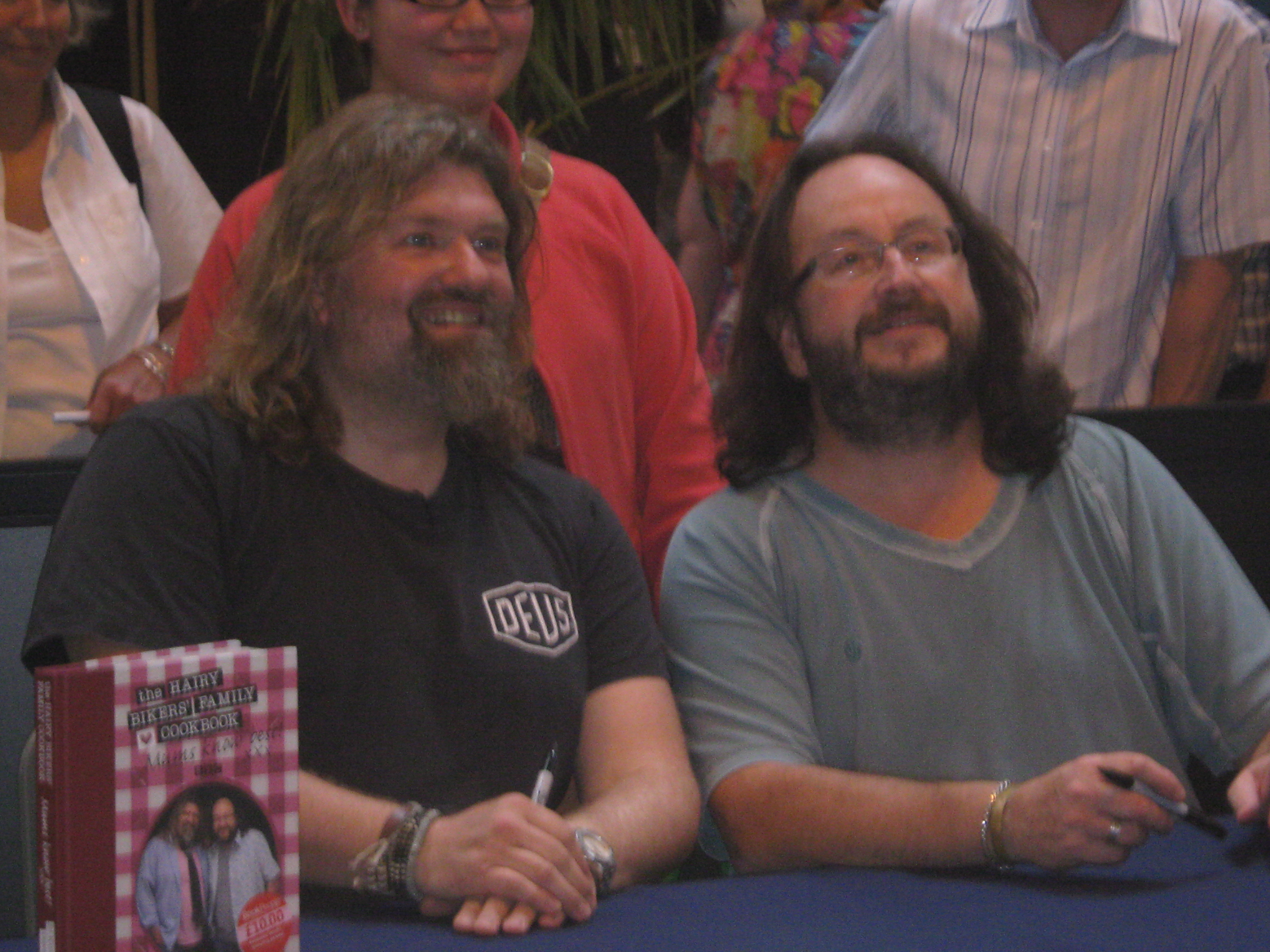
- Si King (L) and Dave Myers (R)
- Born: Dave Myers: 8 September 1957; Barrow-in-Furness, Lancashire, England; Si King: 20 October 1966 (age 60); Nettlesworth, County Durham, England
- Died: Dave Myers: 28 February 2024 (aged 66)
- Occupations: Television presenters, TV chefs
- Years active: 2004–2024
- Employer: BBC / UKTV (former)
- Television: The Hairy Bikers' Cookbook, Hairy Bikers Come Home, The Hairy Bikers Ride Again, The Hairy Bakers, The Hairy Bikers' Food Tour of Britain, The Hairy Bikers Mums Know Best, Hairy Bikers' Meals on Wheels, Hairy Bikers' Best of British, The Hairy Bikers' Bakeation, The Hairy Bikers' Mississippi Adventure, Hairy Dieters: How to Love Food and Lose Weight, The Hairy Bikers' Asian Adventure, The Hairy Bikers' Pubs That Built Britain, The Hairy Bikers' Mediterranean Adventure
- Website: Hairy Bikers Official Site

The Hairy Bikers were a pair of English celebrity chefs comprising Dave Myers and Si King, whose television programmes combined cooking with motorcycling travelogues. Between 2004 and 2024, they hosted over 30 television series and specials for BBC One, BBC Two, Channel 5, and Good Food; they also wrote a number of tie-in cookbooks.

Myers and King, who both had backgrounds in television production, had known each other since the 1990s. Their first appearance on UK television as presenters was The Hairy Bikers' Cookbook (2004–2008). Their other series include The Hairy Bikers' Food Tour of Britain (2009), The Hairy Bikers' Asian Adventure (2014), Hairy Bikers: Route 66 (2019), and The Hairy Bikers Go North (2021). They also wrote 27 cookbooks, including eight diet books, and The Hairy Bikers Blood, Sweat and Tyres: The Autobiography (2015).

In May 2022, Myers revealed he had been diagnosed with cancer; whilst he received treatment, they made The Hairy Bikers Go Local and The Hairy Bikers: Coming Home for Christmas (both 2023). Myers died on 28 February 2024, during the airing of their final series, The Hairy Bikers Go West (2024).

== Presenters ==
Both Myers and King had a background in TV and film production. Myers was a professional make-up artist, specialising in prosthetics, while King served as locations manager on numerous productions including the Harry Potter films and Byker Grove.

They met in 1995 on the set of a TV drama entitled The Gambling Man, which was based on a Catherine Cookson novel. King was the second assistant director and Myers was head of prosthetics, hair and make-up on the production. While filming in Argentina in 2006, both men got tattoos of Che Guevara on their right arms. Simon King is a supporter of Newcastle United. Myers died on 28 February 2024 after being diagnosed with cancer.

== TV series ==
The duo appeared on the BBC's The Hairy Bikers' Cookbook. Their TV shows were a mixture of cookery and travelogue, using a similar format and style to that previously associated with Keith Floyd, including the habit of frequently referring to the cameraman and other crew. Most shows featured the pair riding motorbikes, including the BMW R1200GS, F650GS and Triumph Rocket III. The show also featured elements of the Two Fat Ladies format, including regular banter between the two stars, use of various unusual cooking locations and the use of motorbikes.

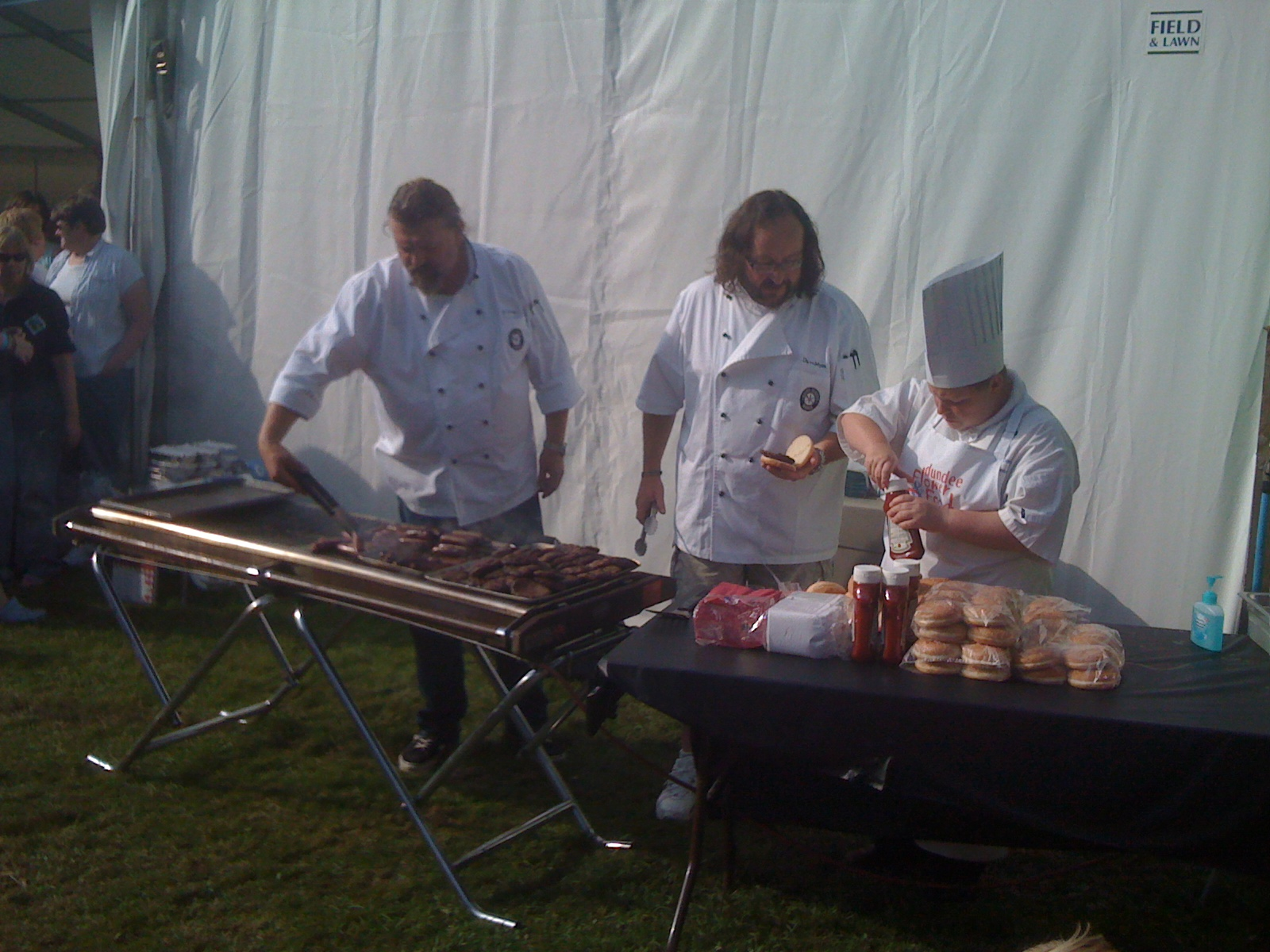
The Hairy Bikers at the Dundee Food Festival in 2010, with fellow chef, Rosie Brooks of Dundee College

The pair have appeared on several episodes of Saturday Kitchen on the BBC, as well as on Richard & Judy on Channel 4. They both appeared on a celebrity chefs special of The Weakest Link and in the première episode of James Martin's Brittany with Saturday Kitchen presenter James Martin.

In summer 2009, they filmed a 30-part daytime series for BBC Two, The Hairy Bikers' Food Tour of Britain, which aired weekdays starting on 24 August 2009. The series saw them visit a different county each day and cook what they considered to be that county's signature dish.

In October 2009, filming of a BBC Christmas show featuring the Hairy Bikers was halted after King was injured in an accident on Tyneside. King came off his bike when a car pulled out in front of him, while he was riding through Gosforth during rush hour. His TV partner Dave Myers was riding some distance behind him. King was taken to Newcastle General Hospital for treatment to bruising to his right leg and ribs. The hour long Hairy Bikers' Twelve Days of Christmas was shown on BBC2, 16 December 2009.

A new six part series titled The Hairy Bikers: Mums Know Best commenced broadcast in early January 2010 on BBC2.

On 25 October 2010, a new 40-episode series, The Hairy Bikers' Cook Off, was launched on BBC2. The programme included a cook off between two families and celebrity guests.

From January to May 2010, the Hairy Bikers performed their "Big Night Out" show in theatres throughout the UK. Directed by Bob Mortimer, the show was a fun mixture of cooking and chat with a little song and dance thrown in. It explored their youth, how they met and their love of food. In October 2010, the Hairy Bikers were guests on the BBC TV series Genius hosted by comedian Dave Gorman.

In June 2011, the Bikers appeared in the second series of Mum Knows Best. The series, made up of eight episodes, featured three 'Star Mums' whose recipes were tested and shared with the public. In addition, one of the episodes featured the world-famous 'pie village' of Denby Dale, where the Denby Dale Pie Company are based.

October 2011 saw a new series, Meals on Wheels, air on BBC2. The series fronted a campaign to save local 'meals on wheels' services around the UK.

From November to December 2011, the Bikers appeared in a 30-part BBC series called Hairy Bikers: Best of British, airing at 3:45 pm on BBC2 (apart from the show's final week, in which it aired on BBC1). The series celebrated British recipes and championed local produce. In January 2012, continuing into February, BBC2 showed hour long re-versions including recipes from various episodes of the series.

After they had signed new contracts with the BBC in 2011, a new series was commissioned. The Hairy Bikers' Bakeation saw them on a gastronomic road trip, looking at baking across Europe, from Norway, the Low Countries (Netherlands, Belgium and Luxembourg), Germany, Eastern Europe (Slovakia, Hungary and Romania), Austria, Italy and France to Spain.

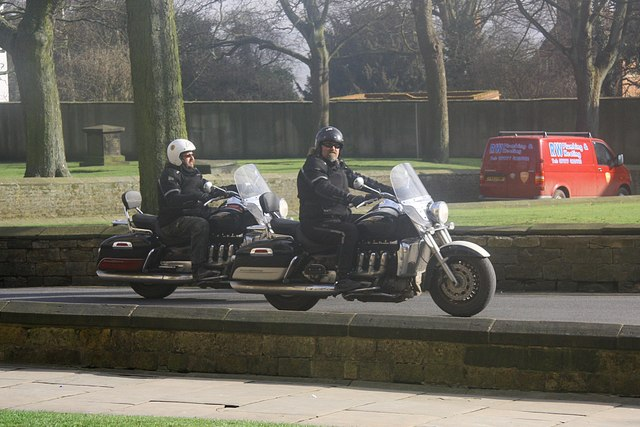
The Hairy Bikers while in Lincoln in 2009

In March 2012, Good Food commissioned The Hairy Bikers' Mississippi Adventure, the duo's first series for the channel. UKTV gave a description of the series: "In this ultimate food and music pilgrimage, the perennially popular Hairy Bikers are getting back in the saddle as they explore the length of the iconic Mississippi River in America in pursuit of the delicious roots of soul food and Southern music." The series was produced by Mentorn Media and the Bikers' first interactive iOS app, also produced by Mentorn, was released to accompany the series.

In August 2012, Hairy Dieters: How to Love Food and Lose Weight showed how the Hairy Bikers' radically changed lifestyles, but stayed true to their love of great food, as they embarked on a campaign to lose two-and-a-half stone (15.8 kg (35 lb)) in three months, and comfortably passed their target weights.

In August 2012, Myers appeared on Channel 4's Countdown in dictionary corner, and again in January 2013.

The six-part series The Hairy Bikers' Asian Adventure premiered on BBC2 13 February 2014. The Bikers visited Hong Kong, Bangkok, Thailand, Tokyo, Mount Fuji, Kyoto, Kobe & South Korea.

Myers took part in the eleventh series of Strictly Come Dancing, partnering Karen Hauer. On 10 November 2013 he was the sixth celebrity to be eliminated from the contest.

In September 2016, the pair premiered The Hairy Bikers – Chicken & Egg on BBC 2. The show featured the pair biking across Europe, America, and the Middle East in search of the best chicken and egg recipes. The six episodes feature the UK, France, Morocco, US and Israel.

In 2018, Hairy Bikers appeared in Hairy Bikers' Mediterranean Adventure on BBC2 This was followed in 2019 by Hairy Bikers: Route 66, where the duo visited restaurants and producers situated along the iconic American road.

During February – March 2020, the Hairy Bikers presented the C5 five-part series The Chocolate Challenge with The Hairy Bikers, where seven chocolatiers battled it out to create, brand, and name their very own chocolate bar.

In 2024, the BBC announced the return of the duo with The Hairy Bikers Go West. The series marked a significant moment for fans worldwide, with the inaugural episode airing on 6 February 2024, on BBC Two. Amidst the excitement surrounding their comeback, Si King emphasised the profound significance of the series, particularly for himself and Dave Myers, in an interview. King expressed the series' importance, revealing that it held a deeply personal significance following Dave's treatment.

== TV ==
- The Hairy Bikers Cookbook, BBC TV, 2006 – 2008(The Hairy Bikers' Cookbook (renamed The Hairy Bikers Ride Again for the third series and The Hairy Bakers for the fourth series)
- The Hairy Bakers' Christmas Special, BBC TV, 2008
- The Hairy Bikers' Food Tour of Britain, BBC TV, 2009. 30 Episodes
- Hairy Bikers' Twelve Days of Christmas, BBC TV, 2009
- The Hairy Bikers Mums Know Best: Series 1, BBC TV, 2010. 6 Episodes
- The Hairy Bikers' Cook Off, BBC TV, 2010. 40 Episodes
- The Hairy Bikers Mums Know Best: Series 2, BBC TV, 2011. 9 Episodes
- Meals on Wheels, BBC TV, 2011. 4 Episodes
- Hairy Bikers: Best of British, BBC TV, 2011. 30 Episodes
- The Hairy Bikers' Twelve Days of Christmas, BBC TV, 2011
- The Hairy Bikers' Bakeation, BBC TV, 2012. 8 Episodes
- Hairy Dieters, BBC TV, 2012. 4 Episodes
- The Hairy Bikers' Mississippi Adventure, BBC TV, 2012
- Hairy Bikers Everyday Gourmets, BBC TV, 2013. 6 Episodes
- Hairy Bikers' Best of British: Series Two, BBC TV, 2013. 19 Episodes
- The Hairy Bikers: Mum Knows Best – Series 2, BBC TV, 2013
- The Hairy Bikers' Restoration Road Trip, BBC TV, 2013. 3 Episodes
- Hairy Bikers' Meals on Wheels, Back on the Road, BBC TV, 2013. 2 Episodes
- The Hairy Bikers' Asian Adventure, BBC TV, 2014. 6 Episodes
- The Hairy Bikers' Northern Exposure, BBC TV, 2015. 6 Episodes
- The Pubs That Built Britain, BBC TV, 2016. 15 Episodes
- The Hairy Builder with Dave Myers, BBC TV, 2016. 15 Episodes
- The Hairy Bikers – Chicken & Egg, BBC TV, 2016. 6 Episodes
- Operation People Power, BBC TV, 2016. 5 Episodes
- The Hairy Bikers' Comfort Food, BBC TV, 2017. 30 Episodes
- Kitchen Garden Live with the Hairy Bikers, BBC TV, 2017
- The Hairy Bikers Home For Christmas, BBC TV, 2017
- Hairy Bikers' Mediterranean Adventure, BBC TV, 2018. 6 Episodes
- Hairy Bikers: Route 66, BBC TV, 2019. 6 Episodes
- The Chocolate Challenge with The Hairy Bikers, C5 TV, 2020. 5 Episodes
- The Hairy Bikers Go North, BBC TV, 2021. 8 Episodes+1 Christmas Special
- The Hairy Bikers Go Local, BBC TV, 2023. 8 Episodes
- The Hairy Bikers: Coming Home for Christmas, BBC TV, 2023. One-off Christmas special
- The Hairy Bikers Go West, BBC TV, 2024. 8 Episodes
- The Hairy Bikers: You’ll Never Ride Alone, BBC TV, 2024

== American version ==
History Channel released an American version of The Hairy Bikers starring Paul Patranella and Bill Allen. The show aired for 10 episodes and was spoofed in the South Park episode "A History Channel Thanksgiving".

== Awards and honours ==
- 2012 National Book Award, "Food & Drink Book of the Year" for The Hairy Dieters
- Fortnum and Mason Food and Drink Awards 2022, "Personalities of the Year" for The Hairy Dieters

== Bibliography ==
=== Autobiography ===
- The Hairy Bikers Blood, Sweat and Tyres: The Autobiography (Orion, 2015) ISBN 9781474600507

=== Cookery books ===
- The Hairy Bikers' Cookbook (Michael Joseph, 2006) ISBN 9780718149086
- The Hairy Bikers Ride Again (Michael Joseph, 2007) ISBN 9780718149093
- The Hairy Bikers' Food Tour of Britain (W&N, 2009) ISBN 9780297859741
- Mums Know Best: The Hairy Bikers' Family Cookbook (W&N, 2010) ISBN 9780297860266
- Mums Still Know Best: The Hairy Bikers' Best-Loved Recipes (W&N, 2011) ISBN 9780297863236
- The Hairy Bikers' Perfect Pies (W&N, 2011) ISBN 9781407239095
- The Hairy Bikers' Big Book of Baking (W&N, 2012) ISBN 9780297863267
- The Hairy Bikers' Great Curries (W&N, 2013) ISBN 9780297867333
- The Hairy Bikers' Asian Adventure (W&N, 2014) ISBN 9780297867357
- The Hairy Bikers' Meat Feasts (W&N, 2015) ISBN 9780297867371
- The Hairy Bikers' Chicken and Egg (Orion, 2016) ISBN 9780297609339
- The Hairy Bikers' 12 Days of Christmas (Orion, 2016) ISBN 9781409168126
- The Hairy Bikers' Mediterranean Adventure (Seven Dials, 2017) ISBN 9781409171911
- The Hairy Bikers' British Classics (Seven Dials, 2018) ISBN 9781409171959
- The Hairy Bikers' One Pot Wonders (Seven Dials, 2019) ISBN 9781409171935
- The Hairy Bikers' Veggie Feasts (Seven Dials, 2020) ISBN 9781841884295
- The Hairy Bikers' Everyday Winners (Seven Dials, 2021) ISBN 9781841884318
- The Hairy Bikers' Brilliant Bakes (Seven Dials, 2022) ISBN 978-1841884332
- The Hairy Bikers' Ultimate Comfort Food (Seven Dials, 2023) ISBN 978-1399607308
- Our Family Favourites (Seven Dials, 2024) ISBN 978-1399607322
- The Best of The Hairy Bikers (Seven Dials, 2025) ISBN 978-1399607346

=== Diet books ===
- The Hairy Dieters: Eat for Life (W&N, 2013) ISBN 9780297870470
- The Hairy Dieters: How to Love Food and Lose Weight (W&N, 2014) ISBN 9780297870432
- The Hairy Dieters: Good Eating (W&N, 2014) ISBN 9780297608981
- The Hairy Dieters: Fast Food (W&N, 2016) ISBN 9780297609315
- The Hairy Dieters: Go Veggie (Orion, 2017) ISBN 9781409171874
- The Hairy Dieters Make It Easy (Seven Dials, 2018) ISBN 9781409171898
- The Hairy Dieters Simple Healthy Food (Seven Dials, 2022) ISBN 978-1841884356
- The Hairy Dieters Eat Well Every Day (Seven Dials, 2023) ISBN 978-1399600286
- The Hairy Dieters Fast And Fresh (Seven Dials, 2024) ISBN 978-1399607360
