= The Hairy Bikers Go North =

- Presented by: The Hairy Bikers
- Country of origin: United Kingdom
- Original language: English
- No. of series: 1
- No. of episodes: 9

Production
- Executive producers: Melanie Leach; Andrew Mackenzie-Betty
- Running time: 60 mins
- Production company: South Shore Productions

Original release
- Network: BBC Two
- Release: 23 September – 22 December 2021

The Hairy Go North is a British food lifestyle programme which was broadcast on BBC Two in 2021. The Hairy Bikers hit the road again travelling from the west coast to the east, showcasing some the best food and produce that the north of England has to offer. Along the way, they meet local artisanal producers and explore the best of northern British food.

== Episodes ==
No.	Title	Original release date
1	"Lancashire"	23 September 2021
Dishes made: Steak, Mushroom and Ale Pie; Lancashire Cheese Lovers' Lasagne; and Gin Key Lime Pie
2	"Yorkshire Coast"	30 September 2021
Dishes made: Moules Marinière with triple cooked chips and dipping bread; langoustine salad with Marie Rose sauce; Miso and beer BBQed chicken
3	"Cumbria"	7 October 2021
Dishes made: Boston Baked Beans with Farmhouse Saute and Cumberland Sausage; American layered salad and Summer vegetable Strudel; Thai spring rolls and Pad Thai.
4	"North Yorkshire"	14 October 2021
Dishes made: Mangalitza Pork and White Pudding Wellington; German Bee Sting Cake; Root Vegetable Tray Bake and Three Cheese Tear and Share.
5	"West Yorkshire"	21 October 2021
Dishes made: Blueberry Skyr Muffins; English Shakshuka; Curried Faggots with Masala Potatoes and Spring Dhal; Curried Crab Cakes and Caviar
6	"Northumberland"	28 October 2021
Dishes made: Potato Scones and Vichyssoise; Carpetbaggers Steak and Lattice Crips; Rack of Lamb and roasted Veg
7	"The Peak District"	4 November 2021
Dishes made: Melandra Loaf; Full English Derbyshire oatcakes; World Patties; Northern Scotch Eggs and Cheesey Custard Tarts
8	"Tyne and Wear/Newcastle"	11 November 2021
Dishes made: Roast Porchetta and Yorkshire Pudding; Jackfruit Curry and Pickled Onion Bhaji; Lobster Tails and Côte de boeuf
9	"Christmas"	22 December 2021
Dishes made: Roast Pork with a Sausage, Chestnut & Prune Christmas Stuffing; Vegetable Wellington; Christmas Pudding & Marshmallow Trifle; Turkey Doner Kebab with Middle Eastern Slaw & Hot Sauce; Frangipane Mince Pies with Rum Butter.
