= The Hairy Bikers' Asian Adventure =

- Genre: Cookery, travel
- Country of origin: United Kingdom
- Original language: English
- No. of series: 1
- No. of episodes: 6

Production
- Running time: 60 minutes

Original release
- Network: BBC Two
- Release: 13 February – 20 March 2014

The Hairy Bikers' Asian Adventure is a British cookery and travel show presented by The Hairy Bikers, Dave Myers and Simon King. It follows them travelling around Asia trying the local cuisine, meeting local people and cooking some native dishes themselves. The series began airing on 13 February 2014 on BBC Two.

== Episodes ==
Episode	Original airdate	Location	Viewing figures (millions)	BBC Two weekly rank
1	13 February 2014	Hong Kong	2.55	10
2	20 February 2014	Bangkok	2.73	8
3	27 February 2014	Thailand	2.24	7
4	6 March 2014	Tokyo	2.40	7
5	13 March 2014	Mount Fuji, Kyoto, Kobe	2.44	6
6	20 March 2014	South Korea	2.32	8

== Reception ==
The first episode saw positive UK overnight ratings of 2.33m (10.1% share) beating Channel 4 and Channel 5 in the same slot. Slightly negative comments were made by The Independent, saying 'Si and Dave's antics prove hard to stomach'.
