= Young carer =

Young unpaid caregiver

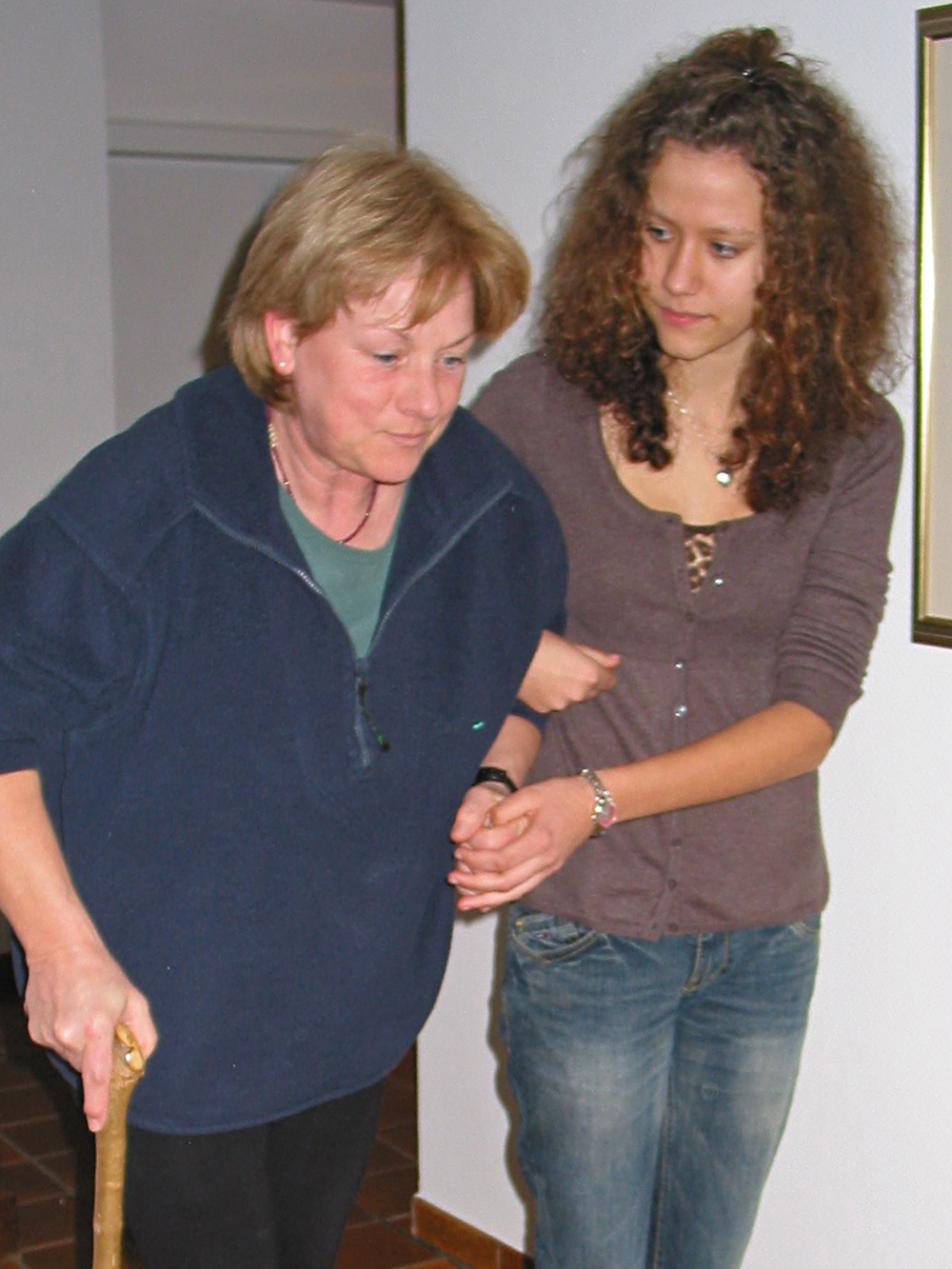
14-year-old young caring girl

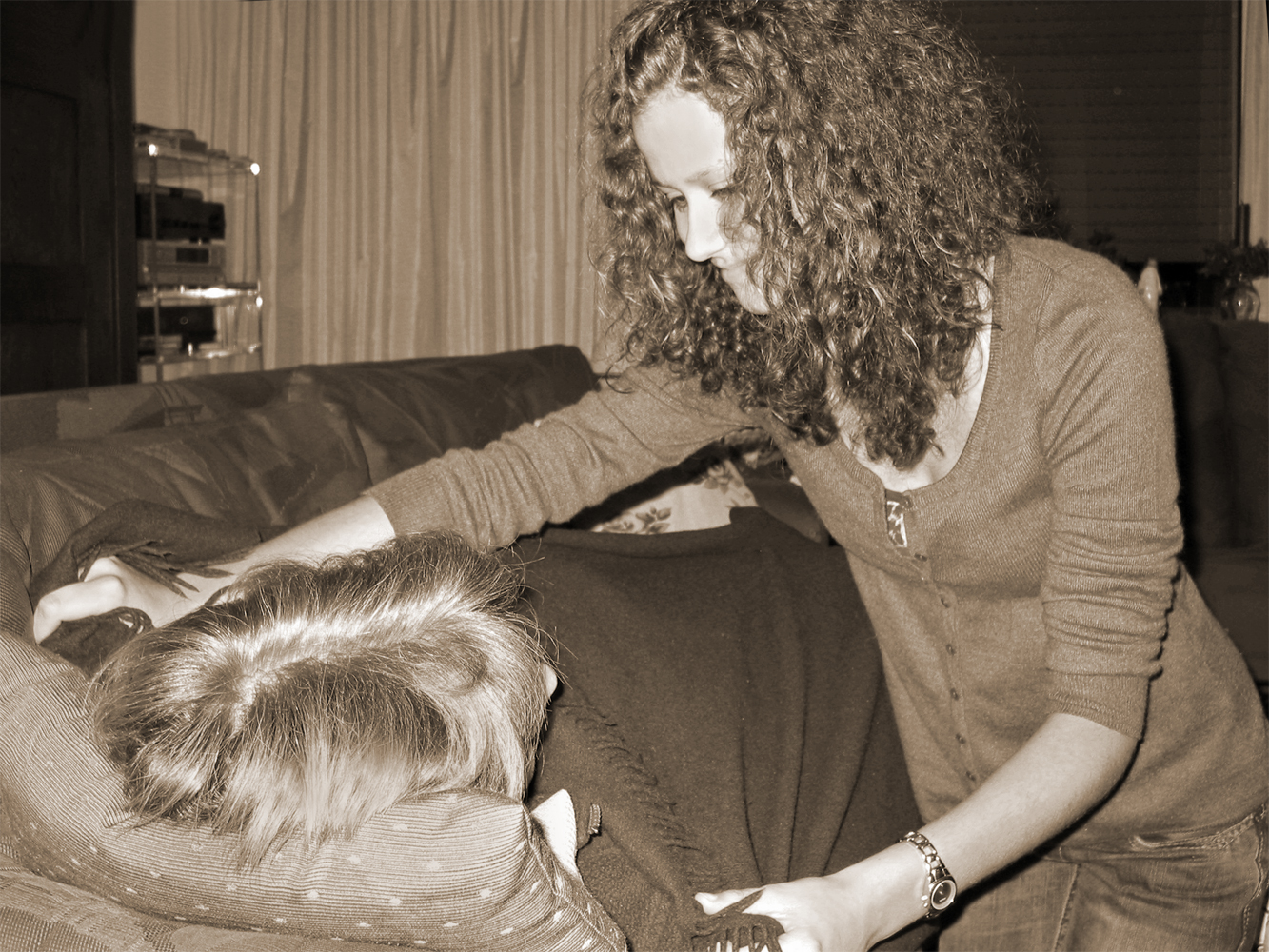

A young carer is a young person who cares, unpaid, for a person who has any type of physical or mental illness, physical and/or mental disability or misuses substances such as alcohol or drugs. The age of a young carer varies between countries. For example, in Australia a young carer is a person under the age of 25 years old, while in the United Kingdom it is under 18.

== Role ==
Young carers discuss some of their work, problems and plans

The roles taken on by a young carer are exhaustive and are carried out often behind closed doors on top of the normal pressures of a young person’s life. The care they give may be practical, physical, and emotional. Responsibilities may range from providing practical support such as helping to cook, clean or wash, giving personal care, emotional support, providing medication or helping with financial chores.

The person they care for may be a parent, a partner, their own child, a sibling, another family member, a friend or someone who does not necessarily live in the same house as them.

== Support systems ==
There are support programs to assist young carers both emotionally and financially with day-to-day tasks and making decisions. These programs offer face-to-face counselling, online programs, and phone helplines.

== By country ==
=== Australia ===
There are estimated to be around 260,700 young carers in Australia (more than 3% of all people under 25), 83,700 of whom live in NSW. Of these living in NSW, 11,600 (13.9%) are primary carers. Around one in ten carers in NSW (9.7%) are young carers. However, many young carers are not included in these statistics as they are likely to be hidden carers. Fifty percent of young carers are female.

Research has also shown that young primary carers are more likely to be Aboriginal or Torres Strait Islanders or be of a culturally or linguistically diverse background than non-carers of the same age.

In terms of geographical location, 21.5% of young carers live outside of a major city.

Each Australian state and territory has a carer association that may provide information and services relevant to young carers. Additionally, Carer Gateway, the national service system for carers in Australia, provides information and support for unpaid young carers and can be reached on 1800 422 737. The Young Carers Network is a national website that also provides young carers with information on their local support services, helpful resources and a platform to share their story and opinions.

Carers NSW Young Carer Program provides information and referral support to young carers in NSW and the professionals, educators and community members who support them.

Little Dreamers Australia is an independent not-for-profit that supports Young Carers across Australia.

=== United Kingdom ===
According to the Carers Trust, in 2016 there were around 700,000 young carers in the UK which is approximately 1 in every 12 teenagers and around 2 in every classroom. Some support programmes for young carers have been cut due to austerity. The amount of support young carers get varies from area to area and is subject to a postcode lottery.

Researchers explored the needs of young carers and the people they care for with respect to the support they receive (for example, social care worker visits, counselling and school support). They found that young carers wanted support to be well signposted and accessible, empathetic, trustworthy and confidential. The researchers suggest that young carers would benefit from improved support for the people they care for (such as more support from a care worker), support from services that takes account of the whole family, and their strengths and needs, clear and accessible information about support services, and help in accessing and trying them out.

== See also ==
- Caregiver
