= Triumph Rocket 3 =

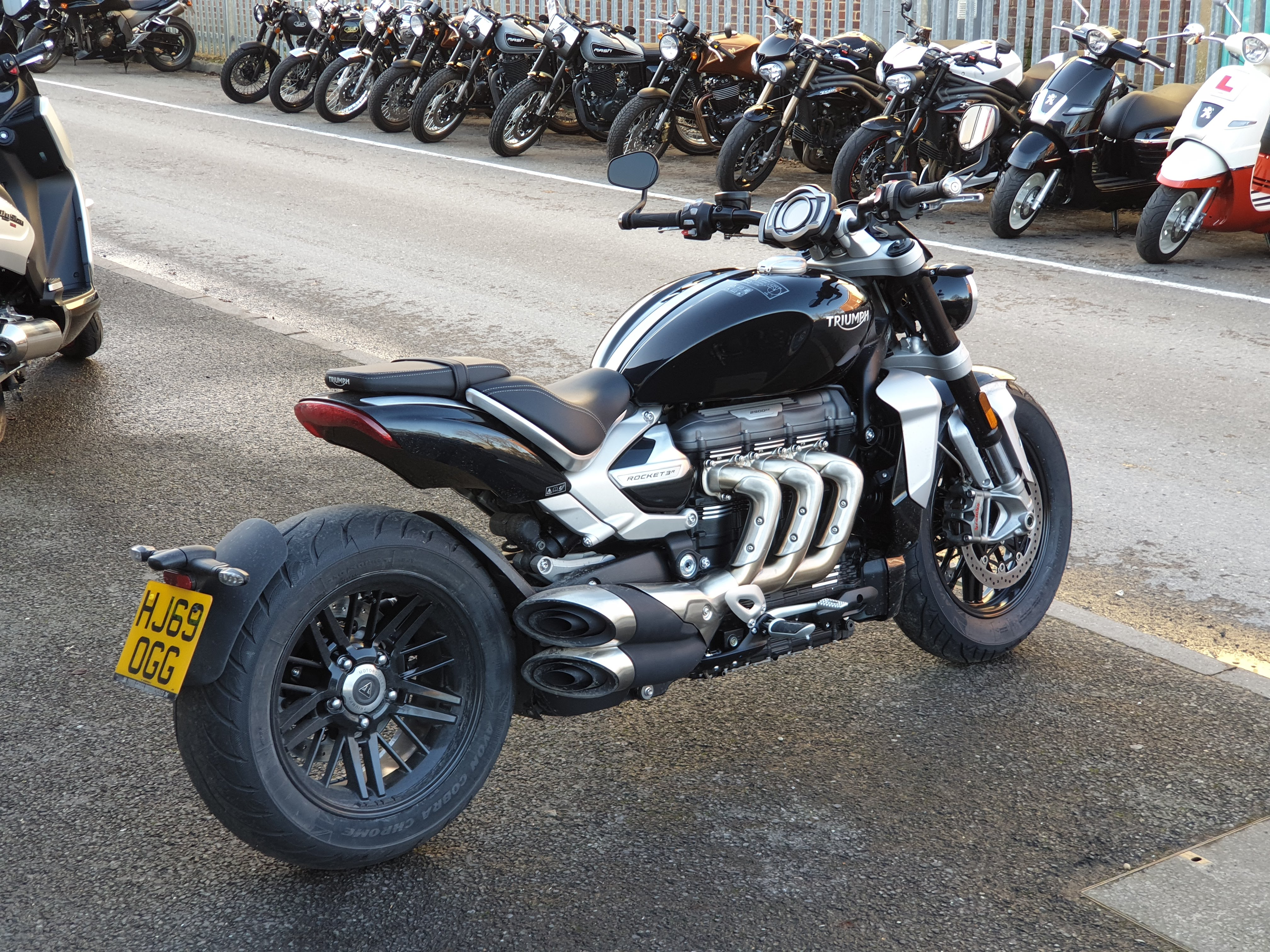
- Manufacturer: Triumph Motorcycles Ltd
- Production: 2019–present
- Assembly: Hinckley, Leicestershire.
- Predecessor: Triumph Rocket III
- Class: Power cruiser
- Engine: 2,458 cc (150.0 cu in) water-cooled dual overhead camshaft inline three-cylinder
- Bore / stroke: 110.2 mm × 85.9 mm (4.34 in × 3.38 in)
- Compression ratio: 10.8:1
- Power: 167–182 PS (123–134 kW; 165–180 hp) @ 6,000 rpm
- Torque: 221–225 N⋅m (163–166 lbf⋅ft) @ 4,000 rpm
- Transmission: Wet clutch, six-speed manual, shaft drive.
- Frame type: Aluminium
- Suspension: Front: Showa 47 mm (1.9 in) upside-down 1 1 cartridge front forks, compression and rebound adjuster. 120 mm (4.7 in) travel. Rear: Fully adjustable Showa piggyback reservoir RSU with remote hydraulic preload adjuster, 107 mm (4.2 in) rear wheel travel.
- Brakes: Front: Dual 320 mm (13 in) discs, Brembo M4.30 Stylema 4-piston radial monobloc calipers, Cornering ABS. Rear: Single 300 mm (12 in) disc, Brembo M4.32 4-piston monobloc caliper, Cornering ABS.
- Tires: Front: 150/80 R17 V Rear: 240/50 R16 V
- Rake, trail: 27.9°, 134.9 mm (5.31 in).
- Wheelbase: 1,677 mm (66.0 in)
- Dimensions: W: R: 889 mm (35.0 in), GT: 886 mm (34.9 in). H: R: 1,065 mm (41.9 in), GT: 1,066 mm (42.0 in).
- Seat height: R: 773 mm (30.4 in), GT: 750 mm (30 in).
- Weight: R: 291 kg (642 lb), GT: 294 kg (648 lb). (dry)
- Fuel capacity: 18 L (4.0 imp gal; 4.8 US gal)
- Oil capacity: 4.6 L (1.0 imp gal; 1.2 US gal)

The Triumph Rocket 3 is a motorcycle by manufacturer Triumph Motorcycles Ltd. Like its predecessor, the Rocket III, it is characterized by an engine that, at 2,458 cc (150.0 cu in), is much larger than any other production motorcycle and consequently has much higher torque. The Rocket 3 is made in three different guises, the sports-oriented R, the touring-oriented GT and the limited-edition TFC.
