= The Hairy Bikers' Cookbook =

- Directed by: Vikram Jayanti; David Rea; John Stroud
- Starring: Dave Myers and Si King
- Original language: English
- No. of series: 4

Production
- Running time: 29 min. per episode

Original release
- Network: BBC Two
- Release: 2004

The Hairy Bikers' Cookbook (renamed The Hairy Bikers Ride Again for the third series and The Hairy Bakers for the fourth series) is a BBC television cookery and travel programme, that ran for four series and a Christmas special. It is presented by The Hairy Bikers; Dave Myers and Si King, both of whom are from northern England, as they travel around the world on their motorbikes tasting the local cuisine, and experimenting with making it themselves. They also talk about the culture and the history of the area that they are visiting, with a sense of humour and passion that has been praised by critics and fans.

== Episodes ==
Episodes (except the winter special) bear the on-screen title Si and Dave do [location], with part 1 or part 2 appended where necessary.

=== Pilot ===
#	Title	Plot
01	Portugal	The duo ride the length of Portugal, the birthplace of fusion food. Si and Dave set out to bring home the best of Portuguese cookery and culture to the eager crowd at their local boat club on Roa Island. They fish for trout in a flooding river, cook on the deck of a hundred year old port boat, go swimming in the Algarve, and feast on traditional Portuguese fare.

=== Series 1 (The Hairy Bikers' Cookbook) ===
#	Title	Part	Plot
02	Namibia	Part One	Dave and Si, travel to the Germanic town of Swakopmund, on the Namibian coast. First on the menu is a traditional barbecue, or braai; and to find the right spot among the massive dunes, the boys take to the air in a microlight. Having gorged themselves on crocodile satay and oryx rolls, they explore a Bavarian café and a township shebeen, before being treated to their first taste of a mopane worm. This is followed by local crayfish, taken from the ocean by the pair.
03	Namibia	Part Two	The pair travel to the north of Namibia. They visit the Himba tribe, one of the last nomadic people to fully preserve their traditional way of life. They encounter ostrich (and a giant fried egg for breakfast), giraffe, and the rare desert elephants of Kaokoland. The boys pitch tent in strange fairy circles, and they roast lamb in an earth pit, and try the local sport of long-distance spitting using springbok droppings.
04	Isle of Man	-	Si and Dave travel to the Isle of Man by boat, cooking crab soufflé and sea bass on the voyage, before visiting the TT Races on the island.
05	Ireland	-	Travelling aboard an old horse-drawn caravan, the pair go in search of the perfect Irish stew, on the way encountering many other Irish delicacies.
06	Transylvania	Part One	Traveling around Romania, the bikers go to Bucharest and visit the local food markets. In Târgu Jiu they look at the sculptural art of Brâncuși and then Corvin castle, the birthplace of Dracula. Finally the boys end up with an outdoor mud bath.
07	Transylvania	Part Two	Visiting Sighişoara, the pair examine Hungarian influences on the food. The pair make dill blinis and spicy Romanian sausages before visiting a very colourful cemetery.

=== Series 2 (The Hairy Bikers' Cookbook) ===
#	Title	Part	Plot
08	Vietnam	Part One	Visiting Saigon, the pair make shrimp & pork on sugar cane sticks, before going to a restaurant where they serve coconut worms, deep-fried scorpion and goat penis. They travel on, trying the national dish, pho, before reaching Hội An, where Si breaks his foot and has to have it put in a cast.
09	Vietnam	Part Two	With Si wearing a cast, the duo had to go by train to Hanoi, where they encounter more local dishes such as Cha Ca fish and paddy-field pork.
10	Turkey	Part One	The pair go to Cappadocia and visit a museum of human hair, and then go to a baklawa factory. Finally they go to Sanliurfa, where they try cooking Sultan's delight.
11	Turkey	Part Two	Near to the border with Iraq, the pair try making their own döner kebabs, and then go for a massage in the hammam. Finally they go to the town of Van, home of a legendary lake monster.
12	Mexico	Part One	The Bikers visit Oaxaca where they try garlic-fried crickets and various types of chilis. They then cook Mole Negro.
13	Mexico	Part Two	Si and Dave go to the Chiapas mountains, where they learn to make a traditional stew. They experiment with making things with local cocoa, and then visit the Maya pyramids of Palenque.

=== Series 3 (The Hairy Bikers Ride Again) ===
#	Title	Part	Plot
14	India	Part One	Si and Dave travel around Southern India, starting in Chennai, visiting temples and fast food joints, whilst all around discovering more about the local cuisine. At a Maharaja's palace they make cocktails and meet some elephants.
15	India	Part Two	The Bikers travel to Northern India, taking part in a local Kathakali performance, and Si discovers a piece of family history in an old remnant house of the British Raj.
16	Argentina	Part One	
17	Argentina	Part Two	
18	Belgium	Part One	The pair visit Bruges, where they sample the local beers, before going on to a small village with a game involving birds.
19	Belgium	Part Two	The duo find a statue of Tintin and then visit a British MEP, and member of UKIP, who talks about his belief in protecting local foods, namely foie gras. The pair then go on to try wild boar. This episode was moved to the end of the series because it featured interviews with MEPs and due to the Local Elections which took place shortly after the broadcast, could not be shown during the pre-election period.
20	Morocco	Part One	
21	Morocco	Part Two	

=== Special (The Hairy Bikers Come Home) ===
#	Plot
22	Aired in 2007 as a winter special, this one-off programme featured the Bikers looking at their own British (more specifically, northern English) cuisine. They visit Dave's hometown of Barrow-in-Furness and visit a local pie shop, before being invited to an Oriental cuisine by some of the town's large Thai community. They stop at various other locations including Bury Market sampling such foods as Black Pudding before tasting the famous Cumberland sausage on top of an old Roman fort in Cumbria, before finally heading east to Si's hometown of Newcastle upon Tyne. The episode gained a series-high audience of 3.4 million viewers.

=== Series 4 (The Hairy Bakers) ===
A fourth series, based in the UK and concentrating on bread, cakes and pastry products began airing on BBC Two on 18 August 2008.

#	Title	Plot
23	Bread	
24	Cakes	The duo attempt to make a Victoria sponge.
25	Pies	The pair make Cornish pasties.
26	Celebratory Cakes	The duo try to make a wedding cake.

=== Special ===
#	Plot
27	A 2008 Christmas special looking at Christmas foods.

The first book that accompanied the series.

== Books ==
A hardback book was released to accompany the first two series. A second one has been released to coincide with the third series' release.

== DVD release ==
The first two series have been released onto a Region 2 DVD, although the Portugal episodes are not included.
