= The Hairy Bikers' Food Tour of Britain =

- Genre: Cookery, travel
- Starring: The Hairy Bikers
- Country of origin: United Kingdom
- Original language: English
- No. of series: 1
- No. of episodes: 30

Production
- Running time: 45 minutes

Original release
- Network: BBC Two
- Release: 24 August 2009 – October 2009

The Hairy Bikers' Food Tour of Britain is a 2009 BBC television cookery programme which is presented by The Hairy Bikers: Dave Myers and Si King.

The 30-part series, which aired weekdays at 17:15 on BBC Two in the United Kingdom began on 24 August 2009. In each show the Hairy Bikers visit a county of the United Kingdom, and learn about its food culture and heritage. One episode was postponed during its original run, due to the FIFA Women's World Cup Football Final.

Each episode features a "taste-off" competition, pitting the Bikers against a renowned chef currently based in the county. Whilst showcasing the chef, the riff from Elbow song "Grounds for Divorce" is occasionally featured.

== Episodes ==
1. "Suffolk"
2. "Anglesey"
3. "Fermanagh"
4. "Cheshire"
5. "Shropshire"
6. "Lincolnshire"
7. "Kent"
8. "Dumfries and Galloway"
9. "Antrim"
10. "Oxfordshire"
11. "East Sussex"
12. "Gwynedd"
13. "Somerset"
14. "Cornwall" (broadcast at a later date, after the rest of the series)
15. "North Yorkshire"
16. "Herefordshire"
17. "Leicestershire"
18. "Gloucestershire"
19. "Lancashire"
20. "Carmarthenshire"
21. "Worcestershire"
22. "Derbyshire"
23. "Monmouthshire"
24. "Essex"
25. "Argyll & Bute"
26. "Norfolk"
27. "Aberdeenshire"
28. "Staffordshire"
29. "Hampshire"
30. "Moray"
