= Triumph Rocket III =

British motorcycle

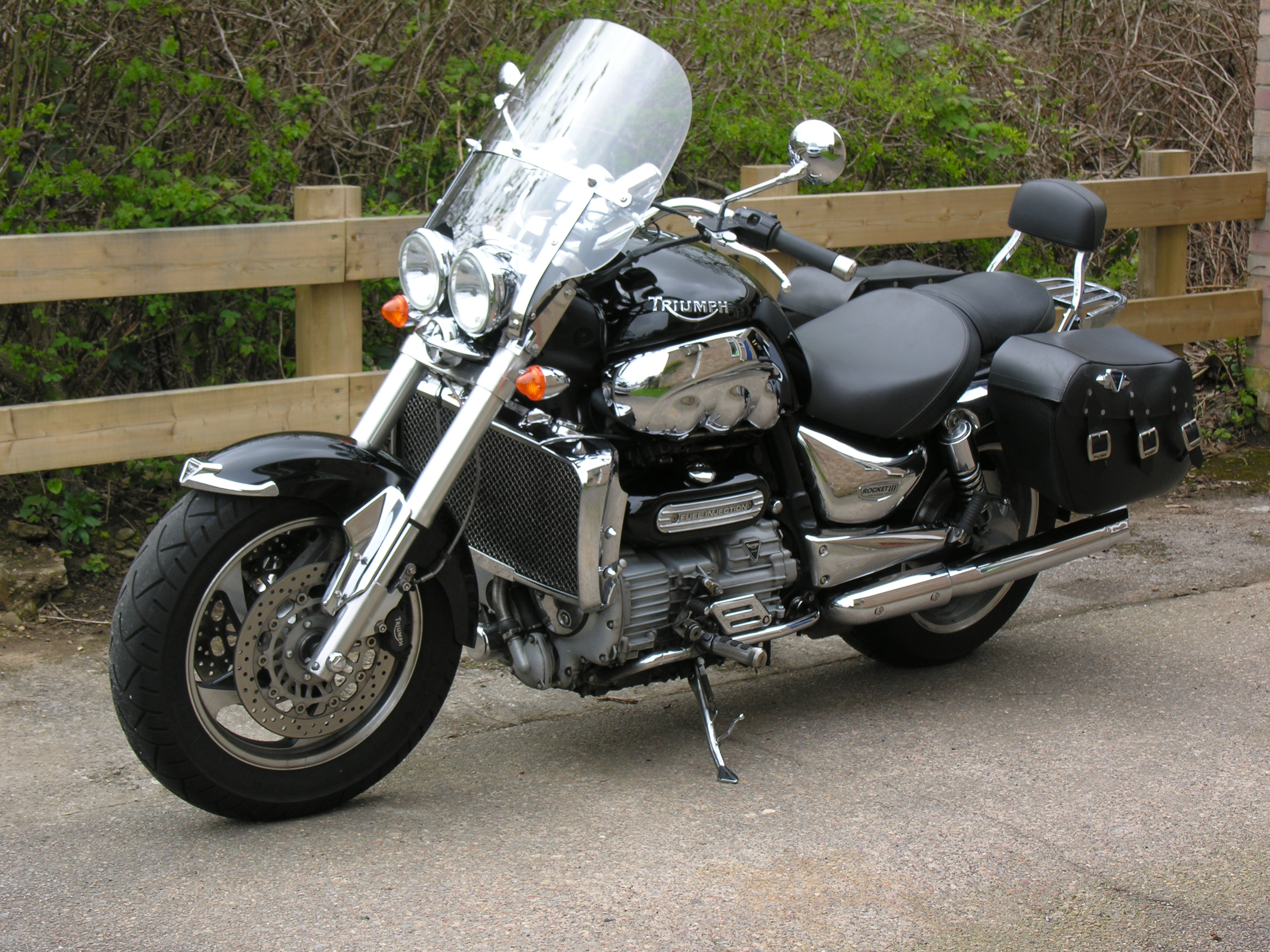
- Manufacturer: Triumph Motorcycles Ltd
- Production: 2004-2017
- Successor: Triumph Rocket 3
- Engine: 2,294 cc (140.0 cu in) DOHC liquid-cooled Inline 3
- Bore / stroke: 101.6 mm × 94.3 mm (4.00 in × 3.71 in)
- Top speed: 145 mph (233 km/h)
- Power: 127.1 hp (94.8 kW) (rear wheel); 148 hp (110 kW)@ 5,750 rpm (claimed)
- Torque: 144.6 lb⋅ft (196.1 N⋅m) (rear wheel); 163 lb⋅ft (221 N⋅m)@ 2,750 rpm (claimed)
- Transmission: Gear (Primary) / Shaft (final drive)
- Tires: 150/80 R17, 240/50 R16
- Rake, trail: 32 degree, 152 mm (6.0 in)
- Wheelbase: 1,695 mm (66.7 in)
- Dimensions: L: 2,500 mm (98 in); W: 970 mm (38 in)
- Seat height: 740 mm (29 in)
- Weight: 797 lb (362 kg) (wet)
- Fuel capacity: 24 L (5.3 imp gal; 6.3 US gal)

The Triumph Rocket III is a three-cylinder motorcycle made by Triumph Motorcycles Ltd. At 2,294 cc (140.0 cu in) it had the largest-displacement engine of any production motorcycle until 2019 when Triumph released the Triumph Rocket 3.

The name "Rocket III" is derived from the 1968 BSA 750cc pushrod triple, the Rocket 3, which was a badge-engineered version of the original "Triumph Trident."

== History ==
The Rocket III Project started in 1998 led by Triumph Product Range Manager Ross Clifford and started with a lot of research – especially in the US, where big cruisers were selling well. The main competitors were the Harley-Davidson Ultraglide and the Honda Gold Wing so the initial idea was to develop a 1,600 cc performance cruiser.

The in-house designer was John Mockett, designer of the Hesketh V1000, the Tiger and the new "retro" Bonneville. He started work with David Stride, Gareth Davies and Rod Scivyer working around an in-line three cylinder engine. At the start of the project an in-line four and V6 engine configurations were looked at but the longitudinally mounted triple design led to the design concept code named C15XB Series S1.

Mockett experimented with 'futuristic' styling that included "raygun" silencers and a large chrome rear mudguard, but consumer focus groups did not like it. The S2 model was a simplified version with a more traditional rear mudguard and several features that were to make it through to the final design. Once again, the feedback from market research was that it was still too radical so the lines were simplified and smoothed out to create the Series S3.

Part of the reason for the secrecy was competition from other manufacturers. Yamaha had launched the 1,670-cubic-centimetre (102 cu in) Road Star Warrior in 2002, and Honda had launched the VTX1800, so Triumph decided to up the ante and go for a displacement of 2,294 cc.

The first engine was built in summer 2002 and tested in the autumn. Twin butterfly valves for each throttle body were used to increase control and allow the ECU to vary the mixture flow and ignition map according to the gear selected and speed. The specification of twin spark plugs per cylinder and multi-hole fuel injectors by Mark Jenner (fuelling, ignition and emission design engineer) allowed the Rocket III to meet the Euro IV emissions limits at launch. The torque curve is modified for each gear ratio, enabling over 90% of the engine's torque output at 2,000 rpm, giving the high levels of flexibility that the designers needed. The 1,500 W starter motor on the Rocket III puts out as much power as the engine on the very first Triumph motorcycle, Siegfried Bettmann's 1902 1.75 horsepower (1.30 kW) single.

The final design of the S3 prototype had a large tubular steel twin-spine frame, designed by James Colbrook. Andy Earnshaw was responsible for designing the gearbox and shaft drive to a 240/50ZR16 bike specific rear tyre. High specification front brakes were Daytona 955i twin four-piston callipers with 320 mm floating discs and the rear brake, developed specifically for the purpose, was a single twin piston calliper and 316 mm disc. Ride handling is controlled by purpose built rear shocks and a Triumph first, 43 mm 'inverted' front forks.

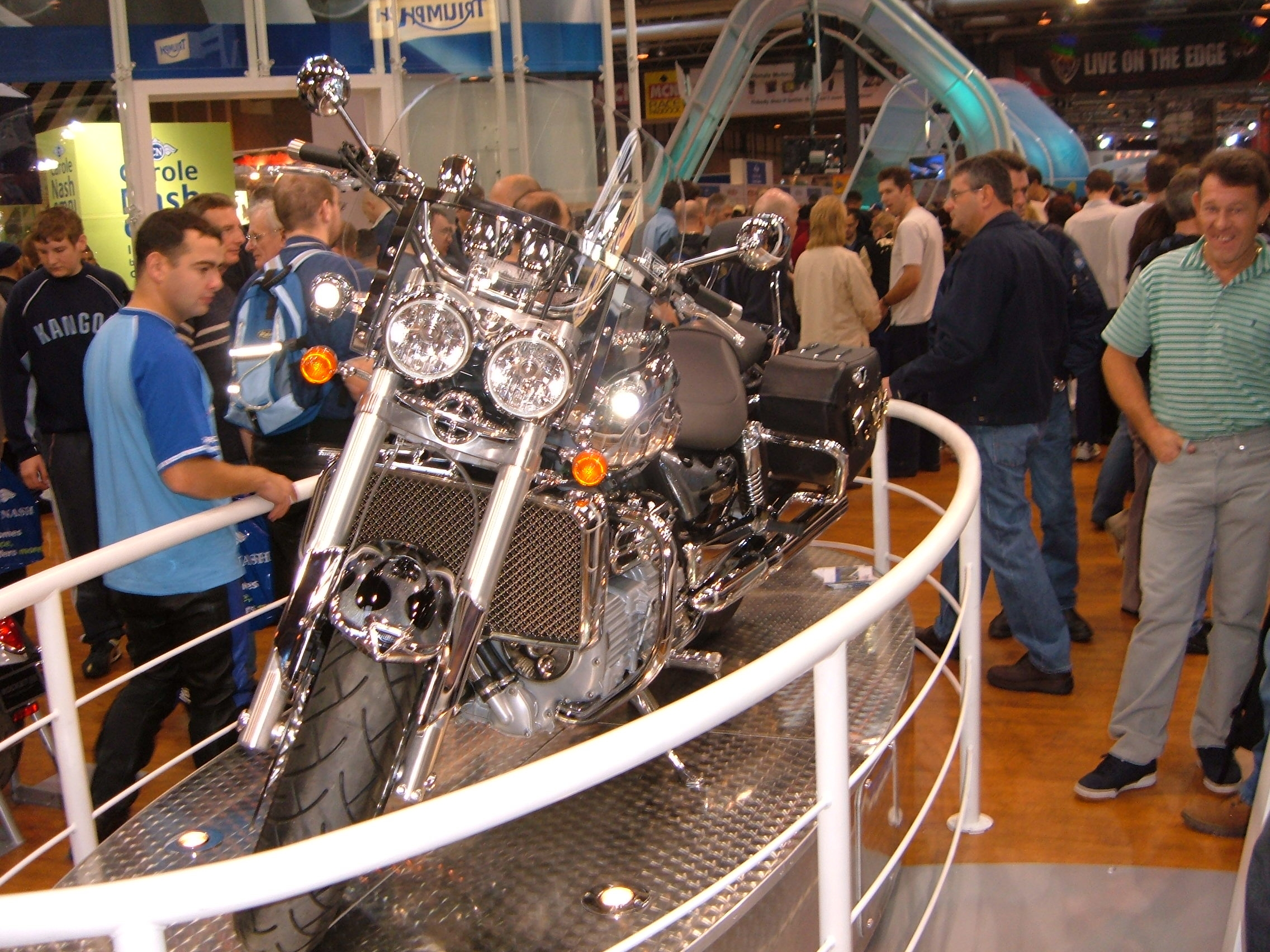
2004 NEC Motorcycle show launch

In 2003, the prototype was renamed the 'Rocket', following market research, continuing the heritage of the BSA Rocket 3/Triumph Trident motorcycles. It was unveiled in the US on 20 August 2003, in San Antonio, Texas. The Rocket's European launch was at the International Motorcycle Show in Milan, Italy on 16 September 2003. Sold in the UK from the spring of 2004, it was awarded 'Machine of the Year' by Motor Cycle News at the 2004 NEC Motorcycle Show. The Australian launch was in Sydney in August 2004, with 230 deposits taken before any had been shipped into the country.

== Reception ==
Despite extensive market research, the Rocket III has had difficulty finding its niche. Originally intended to break into the US's lucrative cruiser market, the Triumph struggled to find acceptance among Harley-Davidson's ultra-traditional riders, who have barely come to terms with Harley-Davidson's own V-Rod. The 2009 Thunderbird competes more successfully with Harley-Davidson bikes. Triumph is spreading its focus: the Rocket III is now in the "musclebike" and "streetfighter" market, where the Yamaha V-Max has found success, while the Rocket III Touring is making inroads to the market for large touring machines.

"Motor Cycle News" said of the Rocket III: "It is the biggest, most bad-ass motorcycle money can buy. The Triumph Rocket III is an incredible experience and bravo to Triumph for making it. Compared to a Harley, the Rocket III is a steal. It’s better braked, faster, handles better and it’s British. Secondhand values remain high and providing you keep to 3-4000 miles a year it won’t depreciate faster than a Harley, either".

== Models ==
=== Rocket III ===
The original model was released in 2004. This model trim is no longer available. The Rocket III Roadster is now the only version available. This model was awarded Motorcycle Cruiser magazine's 2004 Bike of the Year, Motorcyclist's 2004 Cruiser of the Year, and Cruising Rider magazine 2005 Bike of the Year. This model is the newest exhibit at the UK National Motorcycle Museum.

=== Rocket III Classic ===
Introduced in 2006, the Classic version has rider floorboards, different shaped silencers (mufflers) and 'pullback' handlebars. More colour choices were added and the pillion seat was modified to improve comfort.

In June 2007, Triumph used 'viral marketing' to promote the Rocket III Classic by posting a well-made spoof production video to YouTube and bike enthusiast websites, As of September 2012, the video had more than 1.2 million views.

=== Rocket III Roadster ===
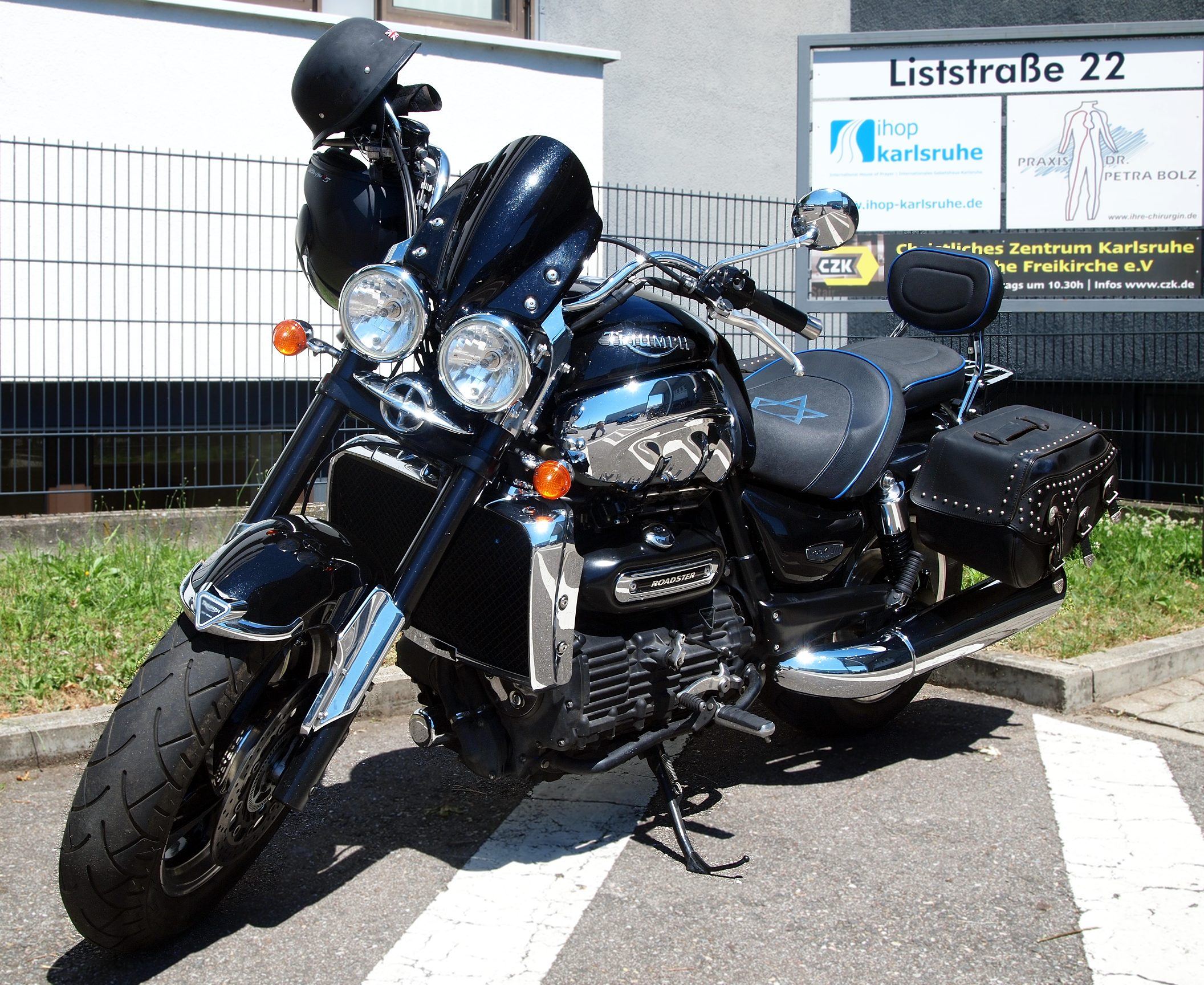
Rocket III Roadster

The 2010 Roadster is the most powerful bike in the Rocket III line-up, with a claimed 163 lb⋅ft (221 N⋅m) torque and 146 bhp (109 kW) power, as well as a dual exhaust, one per side, instead of the previous 2 and 1 layout. Triumph calls it "the ultimate muscle streetfighter".

=== Rocket III Tourer ===
The short-lived 2007 Tourer Limited Edition Model was a Classic Model. The addition of a windscreen, panniers (saddlebags), backrest and luggage rack from the factory, and a choice of two-tone paint schemes

=== Rocket III Touring ===
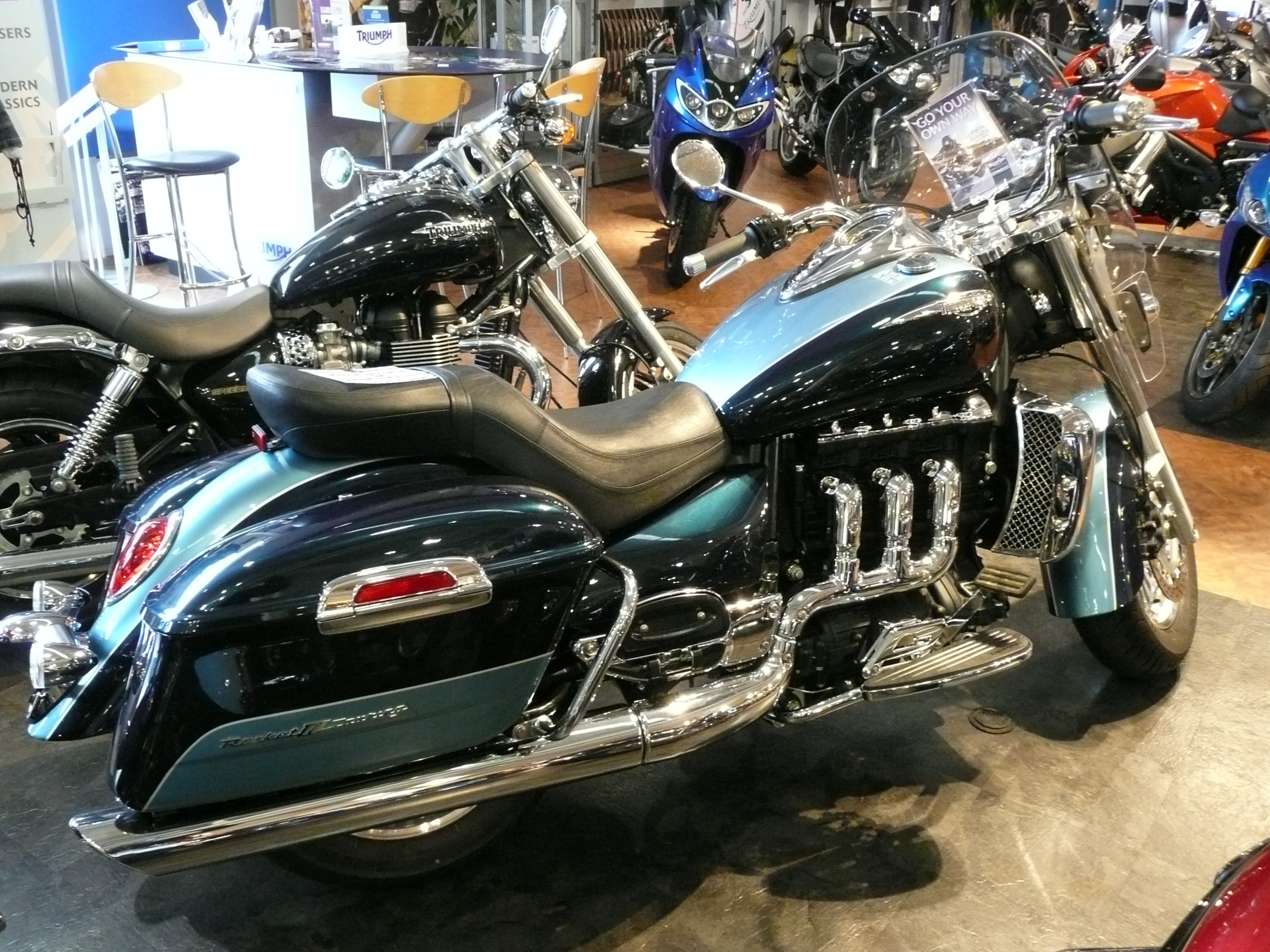
Rocket III Touring (2008)

Triumph began developing the Rocket III Touring version in February 2004 following the launch of the original model, to target the large cruiser market which represents 50% of all US motorcycle sales. As well as a new design for the steel frame and swinging arm, the Touring model has more torque at lower revs – 150 lb-ft at 2500 rpm, but less horsepower at the top end 106 hp (79 kW) @ 6,000 rpm (claimed). The Touring had a smaller 16" front wheel and standard type forks (instead of the upside down type of the Roadster New features include tank mounted instruments and a scrolling switch on the handlebar to set the clock and indicate fuel ranges. The five-spoke design used on the Rocket III was replaced with billet aluminium slotted wheels and narrower tyres were specified to improve steering with a 180/70 x 16 rear tyre to make it easier to fit detachable panniers that come as standard, together with a removable windscreen and Kayaba rear shock absorbers. The Rocket III Touring was discontinued in 2017.

== See also ==
- Triumph Rocket 3, a completely redesigned 2.5 litre model
