= Michigan's 34th House of Representatives district =

American legislative district

Michigan's 34th State House of Representatives district
Representative
Nancy Jenkins-Arno; R–Clayton
- Demographics: 84.3% White; 2.4% Black; 9.3% Hispanic; 0.4% Asian; 0.1% Native American; 0.2% Other; 3.3% Multiracial
- Population (2024): 91,647

Michigan's 34th House of Representatives district is a legislative district within the Michigan House of Representatives located in Lenawee County. The district was created in 1965, when the Michigan Supreme Court ordered the reapportionment of state legislative districts from a county-based system to a proportional one following the Supreme Court case Reynolds v. Sims. It is currently represented by Republican Nancy Jenkins-Arno of Clayton.

== List of representatives ==
Representative	Party	Years	Residence	Notes
John Bennett	Democratic	1965–1992	Detroit (until around 1966); Redford Township	
John F. Freeman	Democratic	1993–1998	Madison Heights	Term limited.
David T. Woodward	Democratic	1999–2002	Madison Heights	Redistricted to the 26th district.
Brenda J. Clack	Democratic	2003–2008	Flint	Term limited.
Woodrow Stanley	Democratic	2009–2014	Flint	Term limited.
Sheldon Neeley	Democratic	2015–2019	Flint	Resigned November 2019 after being elected mayor of Flint.
Cynthia Neeley	Democratic	2020 (Note: Elected in a 2020 special election to replace her husband, Rep. Sheldon Neeley, who resigned.)–2022	Flint	Redistricted to the 70th district.
Dale W. Zorn	Republican	2023–2025	Onsted	Previously served in the 56th House district and the 17th Senate district.
Nancy Jenkins-Arno	Republican	2025–present	Clayton	Previously served in the 57th district.

== Historical district boundaries ==
Map	Description	Apportionment Plan	Notes
	Wayne County (part): Redford Township	1964 Apportionment Plan (Note: Referred to as the Austin-Kleiner plan.)	
	Wayne County (part): Dearborn Heights (part); Redford Township	1972 Apportionment Plan (Note: Referred to as the Hatcher-Kleiner plan.)	
	Wayne County (part): Livonia (part); Redford Township	1982 Apportionment Plan	
	Oakland County (part): Hazel Park; Madison Heights; Royal Oak (part)	1992 Apportionment Plan	
	Genesee County (part): Flint (part)	2001 Apportionment Plan	
	Genesee County (part): Flint (part)	2011 Apportionment Plan	
	Lenawee County (part): Adrian; Adrian Township; Blissfield Township (part); Cambridge Township; Clinton Township; Dover Township; Fairfield Township; Franklin Township; Hudson Township; Madison Charter Township; Medina Township; Morenci; Ogden Township; Palmyra Township; Raisin Township; Riga Township; Rollin Township; Rome Township; Seneca Township; Tecumseh; Tecumseh Township; Woodstock Township	2021 Apportionment Plan (Note: Referred to as the Hickory plan.)	

== Recent elections ==
=== 2020s ===
2026 Michigan House of Representatives election
Party	Candidate	Votes	%
Republican	Nancy Jenkins-Arno (incumbent)	23,444	58.08
Democratic	John Dahlgren	16,918	41.92
Total votes		40,362	100
Republican hold			

2024 Michigan House of Representatives election
Party	Candidate	Votes	%
Republican	Nancy Jenkins-Arno	31,086	64.07
Democratic	John Dahlgren	17,436	35.93
Total votes		48,522	100
Republican hold			

2022 Michigan House of Representatives election
Party	Candidate	Votes	%
Republican	Dale W. Zorn	24,146	62.25
Democratic	John Dahlgren	14,642	37.75
Total votes		38,788	100
Republican gain from Democratic			

2020 Michigan House of Representatives election
Party	Candidate	Votes	%
Democratic	Cynthia R. Neeley (incumbent)	24,030	86.71
Republican	James Miraglia	3,684	13.29
Total votes		27,714	100
Democratic hold			

2020 Michigan House of Representatives 34th district special election
Party	Candidate	Votes	%
Democratic	Cynthia R. Neeley	10,193	91.77
Republican	Adam Ford	914	8.23
Total votes		11,107	100
Democratic hold			

=== 2010s ===
2018 Michigan House of Representatives election
Party	Candidate	Votes	%
Democratic	Sheldon A. Neeley (incumbent)	18,886	89.98
Republican	Henry Swift	2,102	10.02
Total votes		20,988	100
Democratic hold			

2016 Michigan House of Representatives election
Party	Candidate	Votes	%
Democratic	Sheldon A. Neeley (incumbent)	24,248	88.55
Republican	Page Brousseau	3,136	11.45
Total votes		27,384	100
Democratic hold			

2014 Michigan House of Representatives election
Party	Candidate	Votes	%
Democratic	Sheldon A. Neeley	17,124	91.11
Republican	Bruce Rogers	1,670	8.89
Total votes		18,794	100
Democratic hold			

2012 Michigan House of Representatives election
Party	Candidate	Votes	%
Democratic	Woodrow Stanley (incumbent)	28,816	86.92
Republican	Bruce Rogers	4,336	13.08
Total votes		33,152	100
Democratic hold			

2010 Michigan House of Representatives election
Party	Candidate	Votes	%
Democratic	Woodrow Stanley (incumbent)	13,416	83.15
Republican	Bruce Rogers	2,719	16.85
Total votes		16,135	100
Democratic hold			

=== 2000s ===
2008 Michigan House of Representatives election
Party	Candidate	Votes	%
Democratic	Woodrow Stanley	26,867	84.38
Republican	Adam Ford	4,973	15.62
Total votes		31,840	100
Democratic hold			

2006 Michigan House of Representatives election
Party	Candidate	Votes	%
Democratic	Brenda J. Clack (incumbent)	18,457	90.46
Republican	Ronald L. Arnott	1,946	9.54
Total votes		20,403	100
Democratic hold			

2004 Michigan House of Representatives election
Party	Candidate	Votes	%
Democratic	Brenda J. Clack (incumbent)	26,658	88.67
Republican	Steven Mays	3,407	11.33
Total votes		30,065	100
Democratic hold			

2002 Michigan House of Representatives election
Party	Candidate	Votes	%
Democratic	Brenda J. Clack	16,038	87.59
Republican	Rudolph Willis	2,273	12.41
Total votes		18,311	100
Democratic hold			

2000 Michigan House of Representatives election
Party	Candidate	Votes	%
Democratic	Dave Woodward (incumbent)	19,452	65.14
Republican	Douglas K. Mac Lean Sr.	10,409	34.86
Total votes		29,861	100
Democratic hold			

=== 1990s ===
1998 Michigan House of Representatives election
Party	Candidate	Votes	%
Democratic	Dave Woodward	12,110	54.97
Republican	Douglas K. Mac Lean Sr.	9,278	42.11
Libertarian	Terrence Ray Adams	643	2.92
Total votes		22,031	100
Democratic hold			
