= Michigan's 57th House of Representatives district =

American legislative district

Michigan's 57th State House of Representatives district
Representative
Thomas Kuhn; R–Troy
- Demographics: 71.5% White; 6% Black; 2.4% Hispanic; 15.2% Asian; 0.2% Native American; 0.2% Hawaiian/Pacific Islander; 0.9% Other; 3.6% Multiracial
- Population (2024): 91,697

Michigan's 20th House of Representatives district is a legislative district within the Michigan House of Representatives located in the counties of Macomb and Oakland. The district was created in 1965, when the Michigan Supreme Court ordered the reapportionment of state legislative districts from a county-based system to a proportional one following the Supreme Court case Reynolds v. Sims. It is currently represented by Republican Thomas Kuhn of Troy.

== List of representatives ==
Representative	Party	Years	Residence	Notes
H. James Starr	Democratic	1965–1966	Lansing	
Thomas L. Brown	Republican	1967–1970	Lansing	
Earl E. Nelson	Democratic	1971–1974	Lansing	
David C. Hollister	Democratic	1975–1992	Lansing	Redistricted to the 69th district.
Timothy Lee Walberg	Republican	1993–1998	Tipton	Redistricted from the 40th district; term limited.
Doug Spade	Democratic	1999–2004	Adrian	Term limited.
Dudley Spade	Democratic	2005–2010	Tipton	Term limited.
Nancy Jenkins-Arno	Republican	2011–2016	Clayton (until around 2012); Dover Township	Term limited.
Bronna Kahle	Republican	2017–2022	Clinton (until around 2018); Adrian	Term limited.
Thomas E. Kuhn	Republican	2023–present	Troy	
Tom Turner	Democratic	(Note: Member-elect.)	Sterling Heights	

== Historical district boundaries ==
Map	Description	Apportionment Plan	Notes
	Ingham County (part): East Lansing (part); Lansing (part); Lansing Township (part)	1964 Apportionment Plan	
	Ingham County (part): Lansing (part); Lansing Township (part)	1972 Apportionment Plan	
	Ingham County (part): Lansing (part); Lansing Township	1982 Apportionment Plan	
	Lenawee County (part): Adrian; Adrian Township; Blissfield Township; Cambridge Township; Clinton Township; Deerfield Township; Dover Township; Fairfield Township; Franklin Township; Hudson; Hudson Township; Macon Township; Madison Charter Township; Medina Township; Morenci; Ogden Township; Palmyra Township; Raisin Township; Ridgeway Township; Riga Township; Rollin Township; Rome Township; Seneca Township; Tecumseh; Tecumseh Township; Woodstock Township	1992 Apportionment Plan	
	Lenawee County (part): Adrian; Adrian Township; Blissfield Township; Clinton Township; Deerfield Township; Dover Township; Fairfield Township; Franklin Township; Hudson; Hudson Township; Macon Township; Madison Charter Township; Medina Township; Morenci; Ogden Township; Palmyra Township; Raisin Township; Ridgeway Township; Riga Township; Rollin Township; Rome Township; Seneca Township; Tecumseh; Tecumseh Township; Woodstock Township	2001 Apportionment Plan	
	Lenawee County (part): Adrian; Adrian Township; Blissfield Township; Clinton Township; Deerfield Township; Dover Township; Fairfield Township; Franklin Township; Hudson; Hudson Township; Macon Township; Madison Charter Township; Medina Township; Morenci; Ogden Township; Palmyra Township; Raisin Township, Ridgeway Township; Riga Township; Rollin Township; Rome Township; Seneca Township; Tecumseh; Tecumseh Township; Woodstock Township	2011 Apportionment Plan	
	Macomb County (part): Sterling Heights (part); Oakland County (part): Madison Heights (part); Troy (part)	2021 Apportionment Plan (Note: Referred to as the Hickory plan.)	

== Recent elections ==
=== 2020s ===
2026 Michigan House of Representatives election
Party	Candidate	Votes	%
Democratic	Tom Turner	19,854	50.37
Republican	Thomas E. Kuhn (incumbent)	19,562	49.63
Total votes		39,416	100
Democratic gain from Republican			

2024 Michigan House of Representatives election
Party	Candidate	Votes	%
Republican	Thomas E. Kuhn (incumbent)	26,706	57.24
Democratic	Aisha Farooqi	19,954	42.76
Total votes		46,660	100
Republican hold			

2022 Michigan House of Representatives election
Party	Candidate	Votes	%
Republican	Thomas E. Kuhn	17,606	52.64
Democratic	Aisha Farooqi	15,842	47.36
Total votes		33,448	100
Republican hold			

2020 Michigan House of Representatives election
Party	Candidate	Votes	%
Republican	Bronna Kahle (incumbent)	32,093	66.39
Democratic	Will Garcia	16,249	33.61
Total votes		48,342	100
Republican hold			

=== 2010s ===
2018 Michigan House of Representatives election
Party	Candidate	Votes	%
Republican	Bronna Kahle	22,936	63.0
Democratic	Amber Pedersen	13,492	37.0
Total votes		36,428	100
Republican hold			

2016 Michigan House of Representatives election
Party	Candidate	Votes	%
Republican	Bronna Kahle	23,698	56.4
Democratic	Harvey Schmidt	18,332	43.6
Total votes		42,030	100
Republican hold			

2014 Michigan House of Representatives election
Party	Candidate	Votes	%
Republican	Nancy Jenkins	15,421	58.5
Democratic	Sharon Wimple	10,932	41.5
Total votes		26,353	100
Republican hold			

2012 Michigan House of Representatives election
Party	Candidate	Votes	%
Republican	Nancy Jenkins	21,150	52.5
Democratic	James Berryman	19,135	47.5
Total votes		40,285	100
Republican hold			

2010 Michigan House of Representatives election
Party	Candidate	Votes	%
Republican	Nancy Jenkins	16,442	57.2
Democratic	Harvey Schmidt	12,301	42.8
Total votes		28,743	100
Republican gain from Democratic			

2008 Michigan House of Representatives election
Party	Candidate	Votes	%
Democratic	Dudley Spade	29,125	67.9
Republican	Emma Jenkins	13,752	32.1
Total votes		42,877	100
Democratic hold			
