= Tecumseh High School (Michigan) =

Location
- 760 North Brown Street; Tecumseh, Michigan 49286; United States; 42.012°N 83.958°W

Information
- School type: Public secondary
- Established: 1867
- School district: Tecumseh Public Schools
- Superintendent: Matt Hilton
- Principal: Kimberly Irish
- Teaching staff: 37.40 (on an FTE basis)
- Enrollment: 776 (2023–2024)
- Student to teacher ratio: 20.75
- Colors: Orange; Black
- Athletics: MHSAA Class B
- Athletics conference: Southeastern Conference
- Team name: Indians
- Rival: Adrian High School Chelsea High School
- Yearbook: Senior Echoes
- Website: Tecumseh High School

Tecumseh High School is a public high school for students in grades 9-12 located in the city of Tecumseh, Michigan. The school services an area of roughly 80 square miles (210 km^{2}) and includes the city of Tecumseh and parts of the Townships of Adrian, Clinton, Franklin, Macon, Raisin, Ridgeway, and Tecumseh. Tecumseh schools are essentially rural and seen as a middle class school system. For the 2001 school year, the Tecumseh Public School system opened the doors to a new $33 million high school. The University of Michigan, University of Toledo, Eastern Michigan University, Adrian College, Siena Heights University, Washtenaw Community College, Monroe Community College and Cleary College are all within a 35-mile (56 km) radius of the community. Jackson College a strong partner with the Tecumseh School District, offers classes both in Tecumseh and neighboring Adrian".

== History ==
The history of educational facilities in Tecumseh, Michigan began in the winter of 1824 when the founders of the city of Tecumseh, the Evans Family and Brown Family, constructed a schoolhouse made of tamarack poles to house their children. In 1826, a larger, eighteen feet by twenty feet, privately funded school house was built on the public square on Maumee Street. Until 1832 this was the only village school in Lenawee County; in that year, another private school was established on the ridge beyond Evans Creek until being moved to the county courthouse in 1836. The Tecumseh school system continued in this fashion for three years until a branch of the State University was opened. 1840 brought the first publicly funded educational facility when the state of Michigan promoted the building of brick buildings for the house schools. In 1855 a site was purchased at the corner of Ottawa and Shawnee Streets, and in the next year, the school was finished.

First publicly funded Tecumseh School.

The year 1866 saw the first graduating class of Tecumseh with a total of eight students receiving diplomas. Typical of most schools of the era, Tecumseh High School operated more as a college rather than a high school of today. In 1905, students were subject to examination and classification for admission which limited the class size significantly. Students deemed eligible for admission were then subject to tuition: $16.67 to the high school, $13.33 to the grammar department, $11.67 to the primary department. These three departments housed the three courses of study: Latin, Science, and English. A student with a diploma in one of these areas was given admission to any college in the state, without examination. It wasn't until 1919 that the school took the form of a traditional high school.

Tecumseh High School 1919-1949.

Construction for an updated building on nearby Maumee Street began on December 3, 1948. By 1950, the classroom section of the new high school was complete.

== Notable alumni ==
- Andrew Kehoe - Bath Consolidated School bomber and mass murderer
- Julie Parrish - TV and occasional film actress
- Elman Service - Cultural anthropologist
- Jordan Richard-Snodgrass - Professional bowler on the PWBA Tour; 2023 PWBA Player of the Year
- Tim Ries – Jazz saxophonist, composer, and music educator
- Josh Frost - lead singer of the band Search the City
- Amanda Putt (born 1990) - middle-distance runner
