= Nancy Jenkins =

American politician (born 1964)

Nancy E. Jenkins

Member of the Michigan House of Representatives from the 34th district
- Incumbent
- Assumed office January 1, 2025
- Preceded by: Dale Zorn

Member of the Michigan House of Representatives from the 57th district
- In office January 1, 2011 – December 31, 2016
- Preceded by: Dudley Spade
- Succeeded by: Bronna Kahle

Personal details
- Born: June 2, 1964 (age 62) Toledo, Ohio
- Party: Republican

Nancy Jenkins-Arno (née Jenkins) (born June 2, 1964) is an American politician serving as a member of the Michigan House of Representatives since January 2025, representing the 34th district. A member of the Republican Party, she previously represented the 57th district from 2011 to 2017.

Jenkins has a bachelor's degree from Evangel University and a master's degree from the University of Toledo. She worked as a title representative and then on the staff of state senator Cameron S. Brown before being elected to the state house in 2010. From 2017 through the present, she has worked as director of development for Hudson Area Schools.

== Political career ==
Jenkins was first elected to the Michigan House of Representatives in the 2010 election, representing the 57th district. She was reelected in 2012 and 2014. Term limits prevented her from running for reelection in 2016.

Two years after retiring from the Michigan House of Representatives, she was elected to the Lenawee County commission from its 3rd district and held that seat until she returned to the Michigan House of Representatives.

In 2024, following 2022 Michigan Proposal 1's modification of term limits, Jenkins was again eligible to serve in the Michigan House of Representatives. She was elected to the 34th district.
