= Doug Spade =

American politician

Member of the Michigan House of Representatives from the 57th district
- In office January 1, 1999 – 2004
- Preceded by: Tim Walberg
- Succeeded by: Dudley Spade

Personal details
- Born: February 11, 1951 (age 75)
- Party: Democratic
- Spouse: JoAnn
- Education: Adrian College
- Website: Doug Spade

Doug Spade (born February 11, 1951) is a Michigan politician and radio personality.

== Early life ==
Spade was born on February 11, 1951.

== Education ==
Spade attended the Michigan School for the Blind for four years. Spade graduated from Camden-Frontier High School before moving to his current residence, Adrian, Michigan, where he graduated from Adrian College.

== Career ==
Spade hosted the WLEN Radio talk show Party Line for 25 years. On November 3, 1998, Spade became the second blind person to be elected to the Michigan House of Representatives, where he represented the 57th district. He served in this position from January 13, 1999, to 2004. Spade was succeeded by his brother, Dudley. In 2010, Spade was the Democratic nominee for the Michigan Senate's 17th district, but was defeated by his Republican opponent. Spade was nominated by the Democratic Party in 2014 for the Michigan Senate's 16th district, but was again defeated.

== Personal life ==
Spade is married to JoAnn. Spade has had multiple Leader Dogs. During his time in the legislature, Spade's Leader Dog was named Toby. Toby was the first seeing eye dog used by a member of the Michigan Legislature. Spade's most recent Leader Dog is Lucky.
