= Tecumseh Public Schools (Michigan) =

School district in Michigan

Address
- 760 Brown Street Tecumseh, Lenawee, Michigan, 49286; United States

District information
- Grades: Pre-Kindergarten-12
- Superintendent: Matt Hilton
- Schools: 7
- Budget: $37,720,000 2022-2023 expenditures
- NCES District ID: 2633720

Students and staff
- Students: 2,397 (2024-2025)
- Teachers: 138.61 (on an FTE basis) (2024-2025)
- Staff: 319.15 FTE (2024-2025)
- Student–teacher ratio: 17.29 (2024-2025)

Other information
- Website: www.tps.k12.mi.us

Tecumseh Public Schools is a public school district in Lenawee County, Michigan. It serves Tecumseh and parts of the townships of Clinton, Franklin, Macon, Raisin, Ridgeway, and Tecumseh.

== History ==
A Union School had been established in Tecumseh by at least 1860. The first commencement of Tecumseh High School was held in 1867. A new high school was built in 1918.

The next high school, which was built in 1950, became the district's middle school in fall 2001 when the current high school opened. TMP Associates was the architect for the present high school building.

In 2013, Kelly Coffin became superintendent. Some of the changes to the curriculum and operation of the district were not popular with voters, and in 2018, voters replaced the entire school board. 2019 was a difficult year for the district, as a succession of five superintendents were hired between January and July 2019. The sixth superintendent, Rick Hilderley, stabilized the district and announced his retirement in 2023. Matt Hilton became superintendent in 2024.

== Schools ==
Schools in Tecumseh Public Schools district
School	Address	Notes
Tecumseh High School	760 Brown St., Tecumseh	Grades 9-12
Tecumseh Middle School	307 N. Maumee St., Tecumseh	Grades 4-8
Sutton Early Learning Center	2780 Sutton Rd., Adrian	
Tecumseh Acres Early Learning Center	600 Adrian St., Tecumseh	
Tecumseh Preschool	2780 Sutton Rd., Adrian	
