= Onsted Community Schools =

School district in Michigan, United States

Address
- 10109 Slee Road Onsted, Lenawee County, Michigan, 49265; United States

District information
- Grades: PreKindergarten-12
- Superintendent: Jonathan Royce
- Schools: 3
- Budget: $19,607,000 2022-2023 expenditures
- NCES District ID: 2626520

Students and staff
- Students: 1,157 (2024-2025)
- Teachers: 76.8 (on an FTE basis) (2024-2025)
- Staff: 176.51 FTE (2024-2025)
- Student–teacher ratio: 15.07 (2024-2025)

Other information
- Website: www.onstedschools.us

Onsted Community Schools is a public school district in Lenawee County, Michigan. It serves Onsted and parts of the townships of Adrian, Cambridge, Dover, Franklin, Rollin, Rome, and Woodstock.

== History ==
Onsted High School added twelfth grade in 1917, and its high-quality curriculum immediately earned it accreditation by the University of Michigan, meaning its graduates could attend the university without an entrance examination. The district's school, which housed all grades, burned down in 1925 and was rebuilt later that year. It stands on the southwest corner of Slee Road and Onsted Highway.

A major construction project to expand the school was dedicated on November 16, 1956. On January 20, 1974, a new elementary school was dedicated.

With an enrollment of 1,680 in 1995, the district was overcrowded and desperate for facilities. The district was growing quickly at the time, but bond issues to fund facilities repeatedly failed. As of fall 1997, some of the district's 1,800 students were attending class in a pole barn and a nearby church. However, a bond issue passed that year, and an expansion project was completed at Onsted High School around 2000.

Although enrollment in the district has declined overall since 2007, voters passed bond issues in 2010 and 2019 to maintain and improve facilities and technology. In 2017, the district began the Wildcat Energy Project, which included energy efficiency improvements and a 1 MW solar array that was planned to save $3.2 million over fifteen years.

== Schools ==
Schools in Onsted Community Schools district share a campus at 10109 Slee Road, south of the village of Onsted.

Schools in Onsted Community Schools district
School	Notes
Onsted High School	Grades 9–12
Onsted Middle School	Grades 6–8
Onsted Elementary	Grades PreK-5
