= Tecumseh Public Schools =

Tecumseh Public Schools may refer to:

- Tecumseh Public Schools (Michigan)
- Tecumseh Public Schools (Nebraska)
