= Tom Turner (Michigan politician) =

American politician

Member-elect of the Michigan House of Representatives from the 57th district
- Assuming office January 1, 2027
- Succeeding: Thomas Kuhn

Personal details
- Party: Democratic
- Website: www.turner4mi.com

Tom Turner is an American politician who is the member-elect for the 57th district of the Michigan House of Representatives. He was elected at the 2026 election. He is veteran of the United States Army.
