= Bronna Kahle =

American politician (born 1968)

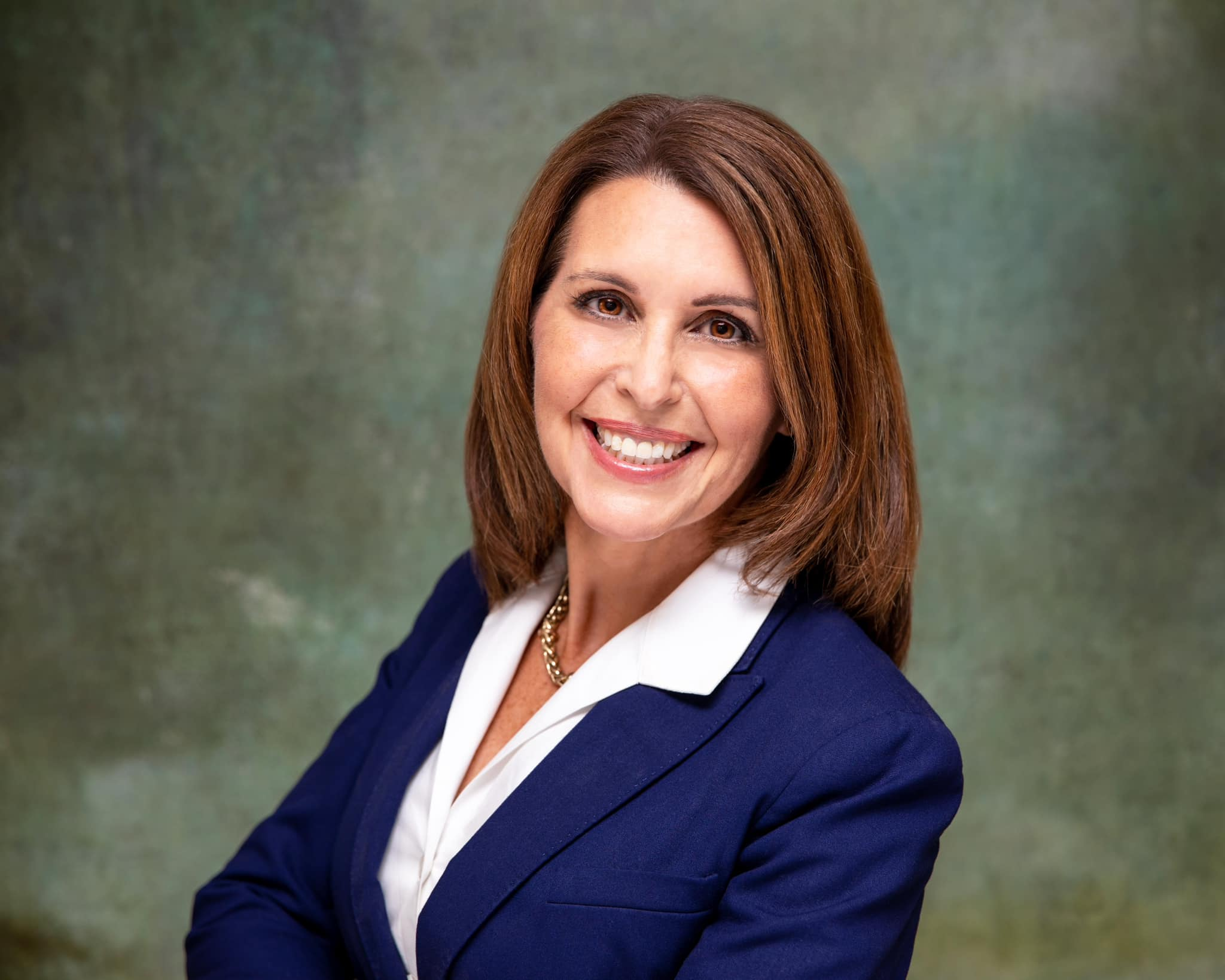

Member of the Michigan House of Representatives from the 57th district
- In office January 1, 2017 – December 31, 2022
- Preceded by: Nancy Jenkins
- Succeeded by: Thomas Kuhn

Personal details
- Born: June 23, 1968 (age 58) Washington, D.C.
- Party: Republican

Bronna Kahle is a nonprofit executive, former State Representative, and public servant from Michigan.

== Professional career ==
In January 2023, after serving as a member of the Michigan Legislature for six years, Bronna became President and CEO of the Lenawee Community Foundation—a nonprofit organization that is focused on enhancing health, civic, culture, education, and human services for Lenawee residents.

She was first elected to the Michigan House of Representatives for District 57. on November 8, 2016. She was re-elected in 2018 and again in 2020.

In the Michigan Legislature, she became a leader in the efforts to protect funding for critical in-home service programs such as Meals on Wheels, reform our criminal justice system, and lower the price of car insurance. She also worked to find solutions to help victims of human trafficking rebuild their lives and lift up those suffering from mental illness or addition.

Before her election to the Michigan Legislature, Kahle served as Director of the Adrian Senior Center. She also owned and operated a small business, which provided home care for seniors and vulnerable members of the community.

In addition to her professional work, Kahle's community involvement includes the Lenawee Walk to End Alzheimer’s, Adrian Symphony Orchestra, Adrian Chamber of Commerce, Zonta of Lenewee, Adrian College, Habitat for Humanity’s Neighborhood Revitalization Initiative, and Associated Charities.

Bronna Kahle's professional awards include:

- Legislator of the Year · Michigan Association of School Social Workers (MASSW) · 2022
- Legislator of the Year · Leading Age Michigan · 2022
- Visionary for Safety and Justice Award · Alliance for Safety and Justice · 2021
- Guardian of Small Business Award · National Federation of Independent Business (NFIB) · 2020
- Michigan Chamber of Commerce Champion Award · Michigan Chamber of Commerce · 2019
- Legislator of the Year · Michigan Manufacturers Association · 2018
- Good Public Health Policy Award · Michigan Pharmacists Association · 2018
- Alzheimer's Champion Award · Alzheimer's Association · 2017

== Education ==
Kahle earned a Bachelor's degree in Business Administration and a Master’s degree in Business Administration from Baker College. She also holds a Bachelor’s degree in Business Administration, with a concentration in Marketing and Minor in Communication, from Salisbury University in Maryland.

== Personal life ==
Bronna Kahle lives in Adrian, Michigan with her husband, Patrick Kahle. They have two grown children.
