= Onsted High School =

Location
- 10109 Slee Road; Onsted, Michigan 49265; United States; 42.0°N 84.19°W

Information
- Type: Public, Coeducational high school
- Superintendent: Jonathan Royce
- Principal: Dyan Biringer
- Teaching staff: 19.40 (FTE)
- Grades: 9-12
- Enrollment: 389 (2022-23)
- Student to teacher ratio: 20.05
- Colors: Purple & Gold
- Athletics conference: Lenawee County Athletic Association
- Nickname: Wildcats
- Website: www.onstedschools.us/our-schools/high-school/

Onsted High School is a public high school in Onsted, Michigan. It is the only high school in the Onsted Community Schools district. Their nickname is the Wildcats. They are members of the Lenawee County Athletic Association.
