= Thomas Kuhn (Michigan politician) =

American politician from Michigan

Member of the Michigan House of Representatives from the 57th district
- Incumbent
- Assumed office January 1, 2023
- Preceded by: Bronna Kahle (redistricting)
- Succeeded by: Tom Turner (elect)

Personal details
- Party: Republican
- Education: University of Michigan; University of Toronto; Detroit College of Law

Thomas E. Kuhn is an American politician serving as a member of the Michigan House of Representatives since 2023, representing the 57th district. He is a member of the Republican Party.

== Political career ==
Kuhn was first elected in the 2022 election. He was reelected in 2024.

== See also ==
- Official website
