= Dudley Spade =

American politician

Dudley Spade (born March 8, 1956) is a politician from the U.S. state of Michigan. He served as State Representative from the 57th district from 2005 to 2010. He is a Democrat. His district includes almost all of Lenawee County. Prior to becoming a State Representative, Spade was a child and family activist.

== Early life ==
Dudley Spade was born on a small farm in Hillsdale County, Michigan to Victor and Mirabel Spade. His father was a retired World War II veteran, and his mother was a teacher. His older brother, Doug, also served as a Representative from the 57th District despite being blind. Dudley Spade received his bachelor's degree in business and accounting from Eastern Michigan University. Spade spent 25 years as a child and family advocate, including 17 years as the controller of the Boysville of Michigan, a facility for troubled youth. In 1994, he received Michigan Federation of Private Child and Family Agencies' Peer Award for outstanding dedication in service to Michigan's families and children.

== Political career ==
Dudley Spade was elected to the Michigan House of Representatives in 2004. He is noted for introducing legislation to ban the sale of Marijuana-Flavored Candy in Michigan and for amending the state's Deaf-Interpreter Act. Spade sits on the Appropriations Committee and chairs the Subcommittee on Human Services. He also served as Chair of the Joint Committee on Administrative Rules.

Dudley succeeded his brother, Doug, in the 57th District, making them the first Democrats to represent that area since 1914. In 2005, he was named the "Visionary Freshman Legislator" by Michigan's Children. He was later honored in 2006 by the Michigan Agri-Business Association as their "Legislator of the Year", and in 2007 by the Association of Independent Colleges."

Spade faced criticism for supporting the closure of the Adrian Training School, a public girls' juvenile detention facility. Critics alleged a conflict of interest, noting that he continued to work closely with Boysville and Star Commonwealth, both private facilities. His brother had actively campaigned against closing the Adrian Training School during his term.

On November 4, 2008, Dudley Spade was re-elected for his third term with 68% of the vote.

After being term-limited, Spade was appointed to a position in the administration of Republican governor Rick Snyder.

== Personal ==
Spade lives in Tipton with his wife Nancy. They have three children. He belongs to the First Presbyterian Church in Tecumseh, where Dudley used to serve as a deacon.
