= Adrian Charter Township, Michigan =

Adrian Township, Michigan
- Charter township
- Adrian Charter Township
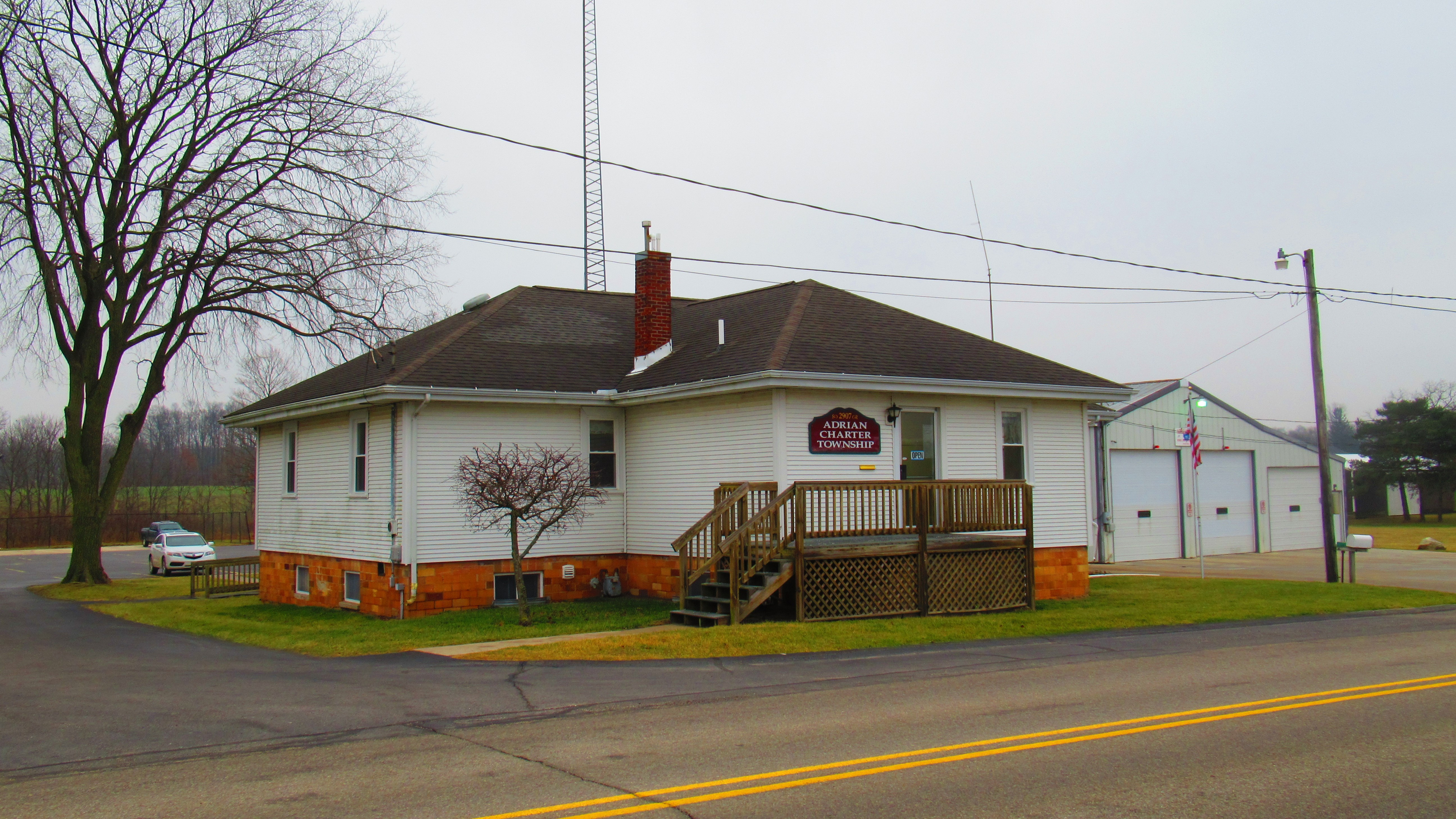
- Adrian Charter Township Office

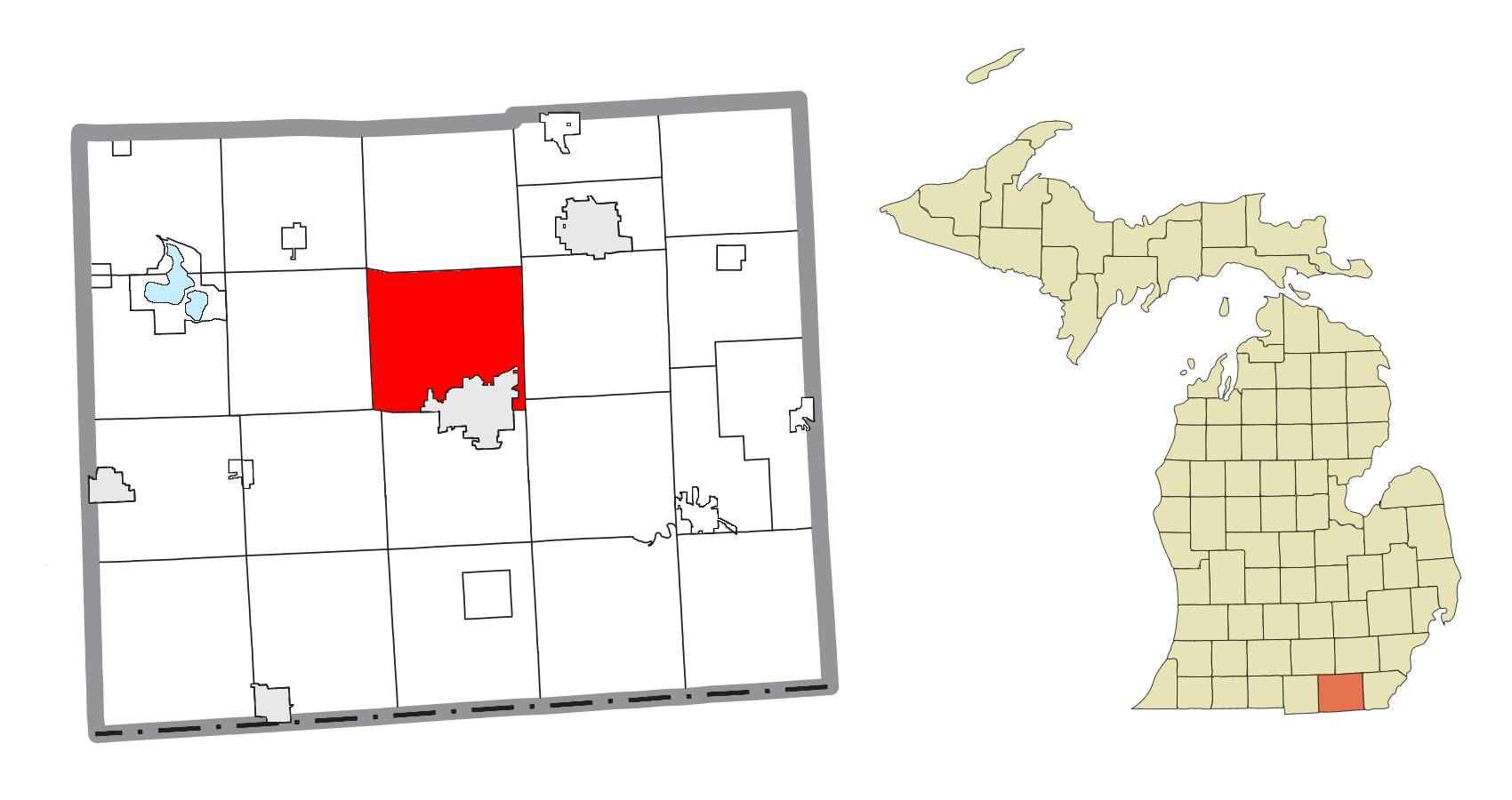
- Location within Lenawee County

- Location within the state of Michigan Location within the United States
- Coordinates: 41°55′55″N 84°03′18″W
- Country: United States
- State: Michigan
- County: Lenawee
- Established: 1834

Government
  - Supervisor: Stephen May
  - Clerk: Sarah Buku

Area
  - Total: 34.01 sq mi (88.09 km^{2})
  - Land: 33.99 sq mi (88.03 km^{2})
  - Water: 0.019 sq mi (0.05 km^{2})
- Elevation: 869 ft (265 m)

Population (2020)
  - Total: 6,401
  - Density: 188.3/sq mi (72.7/km^{2})
- Time zone: UTC-5 (Eastern (EST))
  - Summer (DST): UTC-4 (EDT)
- ZIP code(s): 49221 (Adrian); 49286 (Tecumseh); 49287 (Tipton)
- Area code: 517
- FIPS code: 26-00460
- GNIS feature ID: 1625804
- Website: Official website

Adrian Charter Township is a charter township of Lenawee County in the U.S. state of Michigan. The township population was 6,401 at the 2020 census. The city of Adrian borders on the south, but the two are administered autonomously.

== Communities ==
- Birdsall is an unincorporated community located along M-52 on the eastern border of the township with Raisin Township at 41°56′31″N 84°00′16″W. The community was first settled as early as 1827 by farmer Darius Comstock, who was the brother of Addison Comstock, who founded the community of Adrian. The area settled around a Quaker school and seminary, which operated from 1850 to 1907. In 1897, the community received a station along the Detroit & Lima Northern Railroad. That year, a post office opened on July 15, 1897 and was named Birdsall after the first and only postmaster, Daniel B. Birdsall. The post office operated only briefly and closed on October 15, 1901.

== History ==
The present boundaries of Adrian Township correspond to survey township 6 South Range 3 East. Lenawee County was initially divided into three townships by act of the Michigan Territorial Council on April 12, 1827. Tecumseh Township spanned the northern portion of the county, Logan Township spanned the middle tier, and Blissfield Township spanned the southern tier (and also included an area in the Toledo Strip which ultimately became part of Ohio).

Over time, new townships were created and the area of Logan Township was reduced. By an act of the Territorial Legislature on March 7, 1834, Logan Township was reduced to consist of T6S R3E and was renamed as Adrian Township to match that of Adrian, the main village in the township. The village of Adrian was platted under the name Logan in 1828 by Addison J. Comstock, but was soon renamed Adrian after the Roman Emperor Hadrian at the request of Comstock's wife.

== Geography ==
According to the U.S. Census Bureau, the township has a total area of 34.01 square miles (88.09 km^{2}), of which 33.99 square miles (88.03 km^{2}) is land and 0.02 square miles (0.05 km^{2}) (0.06%) is water.

=== Major highways ===
- US 223 runs briefly through the southwest portion of the township.
- M-52 (North Adrian Highway) runs along most of the eastern boundary of the township.

== Demographics ==
As of the census of 2000, there were 5,749 people, 2,147 households, and 1,711 families residing in the township. The population density was 166.4 inhabitants per square mile (64.2/km^{2}). There were 2,224 housing units at an average density of 64.4 per square mile (24.9/km^{2}). The racial makeup of the township was 92.68% White, 1.65% African American, 0.45% Native American, 0.80% Asian, 2.94% from other races, and 1.48% from two or more races. Hispanic or Latino of any race were 5.97% of the population.

There were 2,147 households, of which 32.9% had children under the age of 18 living with them, 70.7% were married couples living together, 6.9% had a female householder with no husband present, and 20.3% were non-families. 16.8% of all households were made up of individuals, and 8.1% had someone living alone who was 65 years of age or older. The average household size was 2.67 and the average family size was 2.99.

In the township the population was spread out, with 24.9% under the age of 18, 6.8% from 18 to 24, 26.1% from 25 to 44, 29.4% from 45 to 64, and 12.8% who were 65 years of age or older. The median age was 40 years. For every 100 females, there were 97.6 males. For every 100 females age 18 and over, there were 96.4 males.

The median income for a household in the township was $60,640, and the median income for a family was $64,653. Males had a median income of $46,106 versus $28,558 for females. The total per capita income for the township was $24,881. About 1.4% of families and 3.2% of the population were below the poverty line, including 2.2% of those under age 18 and 3.3% of those aged 65 or over.

== Education ==
The majority of the township is served by Adrian Public Schools to the south in the city of Adrian, while portions of the western part of the township are served by Onsted Community Schools to the northwest in the village of Onsted.

Siena Heights University, which formerly operated, had some property extend into the township.
