= Search the City =

American alternative and punk band

- Origin: Detroit, Michigan, United States
- Genres: Alternative rock, emo, pop punk
- Years active: 2004–2009, 2011–2014
- Labels: Tooth & Nail

Search the City was an American rock band from Detroit, Michigan who released two EPs and two studio albums.

== History ==
The band was founded by Alex Sheldon (guitar) and Adam McMillion (drums) in 2004. McMillion, who had recently graduated from Churchill High School in Michigan, met together in college and started playing together. The group added members Josh Frost (vocals), Jim Czech (guitar), and Eli Clark (bass) and began performing and recording as a quintet.

In 2006, their debut EP Ghosts was released. The band toured behind the EP, appearing on the Vans Warped Tour and opening for groups such as The Audition and Spitalfield. They were signed to Tooth & Nail Records and released their new debut album A Fire So Big the Heavens Can See It on April 1, 2008. A Fire So Big the Heavens Can See It charted at No. 46 on the Billboard Top Christian Albums chart. The album was produced by James Paul Wisner. Allmusic and Jesus Freak Hideout compared the band's sound to Jimmy Eat World, as did IndieVisionMusic, who likened the album to Jimmy Eat World's Bleed American.

In 2011, Adam McMillion left the group and began drumming for the band Fireflight.

In June 2012, the group announced new material, with lead singer Josh Frost having been replaced by new vocalist Travis Bobier. This lineup released the group's second and final full-length album, Flight, in 2013.

== Past members ==
- Josh Frost - vocals
- James “Jimmy Fullblast” Czech - Guitar
- Alex Sheldon - Guitar
- Andy Paonessa - Guitar, backing vocals
- Adam Mcmillion - Drums, backing vocals
- Jim Baird - Bass guitar
- Brandon James Ellis - Bass guitar, backing vocals
- Travis Bobier - Vocals
- Justin Unruh - Drums, studio musician
- Eli Clark - Bass guitar
- Chris Jenkins - Drums
- Joe Marks - Bass

== Discography ==
- Ghosts — 2006 EP
- A Fire So Big the Heavens Can See It — 2008
- Demos — 2012 EP
- Flight — 2013

== Albums ==
Ghosts EP

1. This Is Your Captain Speaking
2. Mays Funeral
3. We Get Along Like A House On Fire
4. The Holiday Song
5. Streetlight Diaries
6. Clocks and Timepieces

A Fire So Big the Heavens Can See It

1. Son of a Gun
2. To The Moon For All I Care
3. Detroit Was Built on Secrets
4. Ambulance Chaser
5. Talk Is Cheap and I've Got Expensive Taste
6. The Rescue
7. Bigger Scars Make Better Stories
8. The Streetlight Diaries
9. In This Scene You're Just an Extra
10. Clocks and Timepieces

Flight

1. My Secrets Have Secrets Too
2. Syndicated Reality
3. Heartstrings
4. Whispers and Memories
5. The Runaways
6. Young Hearts
7. Light the Fire
8. A Beautiful Mess
9. Rewrite the Ending
10. One Last Lullaby
11. Get A Grip
12. Watch the Stars Fall

== Singles ==
Year	Title	Album
2008	"Bigger Scars Make Better Stories"	A Fire So Big The Heavens Can See It
2008	"Son of a Gun"	A Fire So Big The Heavens Can See It
2008	"Ambulance Chaser"	A Fire So Big The Heavens Can See It
2008	"Clocks and Timepieces"	A Fire So Big The Heavens Can See It
2009	"The Rescue"	A Fire So Big The Heavens Can See It
2009	"Detroit Was Built on Secrets"	A Fire So Big The Heavens Can See It
2009	"The Streetlight Diaries"	A Fire So Big The Heavens Can See It
2013	"Light the Fire"	Flight
2013	"The Runaways"	Flight
2013	"Young Hearts"	Flight
2013	"Watch the Stars Fall"	Flight
2014	"Get a Grip"	Flight
2014	"Whispers & Memories"	Flight
2014	"Heartstrings"	Flight
2014	"Rewrite the Ending"	Flight
2014	"One Last Lullaby"	Flight
