= Leader Dogs for the Blind =

American guide dog training organization

- Type: Non-profit
- Industry: Guide dog training
- Founded: 1939
- Founder: Uptown Detroit Lions Club
- Headquarters: Rochester Hills, Michigan, United States
- Key people: Susan Daniels, President & CEO
- Revenue: 16,629,630 United States dollar (2017)
- Total assets: 29,006,678 United States dollar (2022)
- Website: www.leaderdog.org

Leader Dogs for the Blind is a guide dog training organization located in Rochester Hills, Michigan. It was founded in 1939 by Lions Club members Charles Nutting, Don Schuur and S.A. Dodge, as the second guide dog organization founded in the United States and has paired over 14,500 dogs with the visually impaired worldwide, making it one of the largest organizations of its kind.

Much like "Seeing Eye Dogs" from The Seeing Eye, Leader Dog's trained canines are called "Leader Dogs."

Leader Dog is a nonprofit organization. All expenses, including room and board, airfare, training and equipment, and the guide dog itself, are offered free of charge. An applicant, after being accepted into the program, travels to Leader Dog headquarters and typically spends three weeks training with their new dog, after which the dog belongs to the applicant officially. Additionally, some applicants may receive in-home training or a hybrid of on-campus and in-home training.

In addition to its guide dog program, Leader Dog has a program that instructs people in traveling with a white cane, as well as a summer camp for teenagers who are blind.

Golden Retriever "Lexie," a graduate of Leader Dogs for the Blind.

Leader Dogs employs a breeding program to supply dogs, consisting of Labrador and Golden Retrievers, German Shepherd Dogs, and crosses of those breeds. Breeding dogs donated from the general public that are of fitting physical and mental character are also occasionally accepted. Additionally, dogs unsuited for the work of a guide dog may be "career changed" to service, detection, veteran, and court advocacy dog organizations.

== History ==
In the summer of 1938, the Uptown Detroit Lions Club members gathered to discuss the future of Dr. Glenn Wheeler, a blind man who had shown interest in obtaining a personal guide dog. They decided to pay all of the expenses for the man and contacted the only school in America at the time for guide dogs, The Seeing Eye. The club was turned down because of the organization's policy, which stated that individuals could not be sponsored by clubs or organizations, but that the contributions must go into the school as a whole, to be used where needed. This was an initial setback.

However, the Lions Club members did find individual trainers of dogs, including one in particular named Glen Staines, who trained Doberman Pinschers. He was hired on October 6, 1938, to train as many as four dogs for a price of eight hundred dollars. If students could not be found, then the agreement would be terminated, and the Lions Club would have to keep two of the dogs. They did find four students: Dr. Wheeler, Earl Morrey, William Joyce, and Paul Brown. After hearing about the cause, the Park Avenue Hotel in downtown Detroit offered free accommodations for the students learning to work with their dogs. Soon the club needed a name for their mounting project. They had dogs, a trainer, students, and a place to house these students, something they had not even imagined.

To find a suitable name, a four-page report was sent out to every single member of Lions Clubs International. Over 500 names were sent back as suggestions. "Lions Leader" was the name selected and printed in the newspapers on December 14, 1938. In February 1939, all four Doberman Pinschers were placed with their new owners. The club wanted to expand their help beyond the actual club, and on April 4, 1939, the "Lion's Leader Dog Foundation" was initiated. To get the new organization off the ground, an actual facility was needed. A small farm in Rochester Hills, Michigan was selected. On the property were a house, a barn, and a small garage, which were all rented for fifty dollars a month.

The name was changed to "Leader Dog League for the Blind" in 1940, and during the first year eighteen dogs were placed with blind students. Despite many hardships, the school stayed open and was helped tremendously by the number of blind veterans returning from World War II. The blind were requesting dogs for their new lives and businesses began to hire the blind, as it was realized that many blind could carry on normal jobs. The United States government eventually promised federal funds to all guide dog schools and these schools began to pop up everywhere around the country. To date, Leader Dogs for the Blind has paired over 14,500 dogs with the visually impaired and continues to serve clients around the world.
