= Ridgeway Township, Michigan =

- Civil township
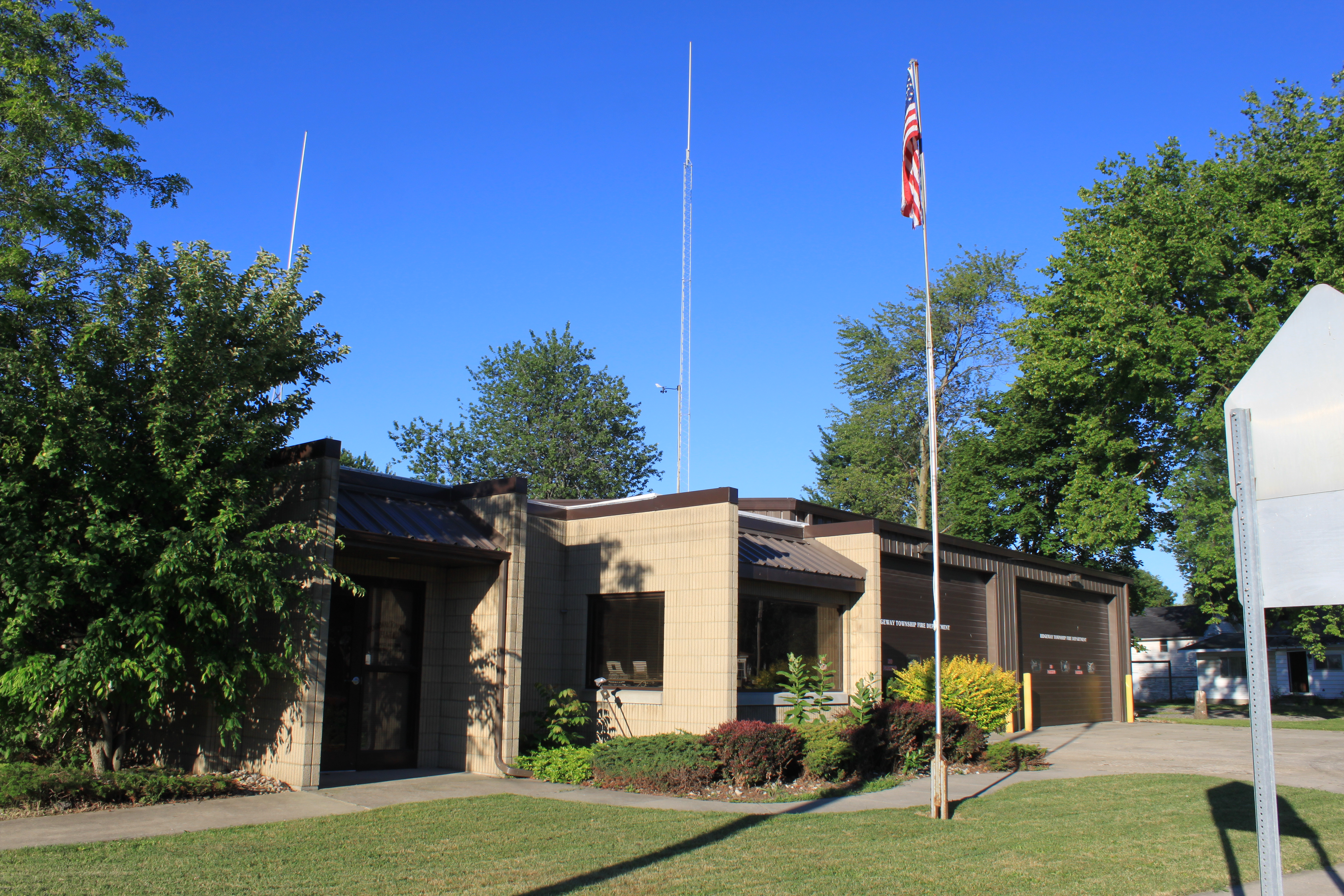
- Township Hall and Fire Department in Britton

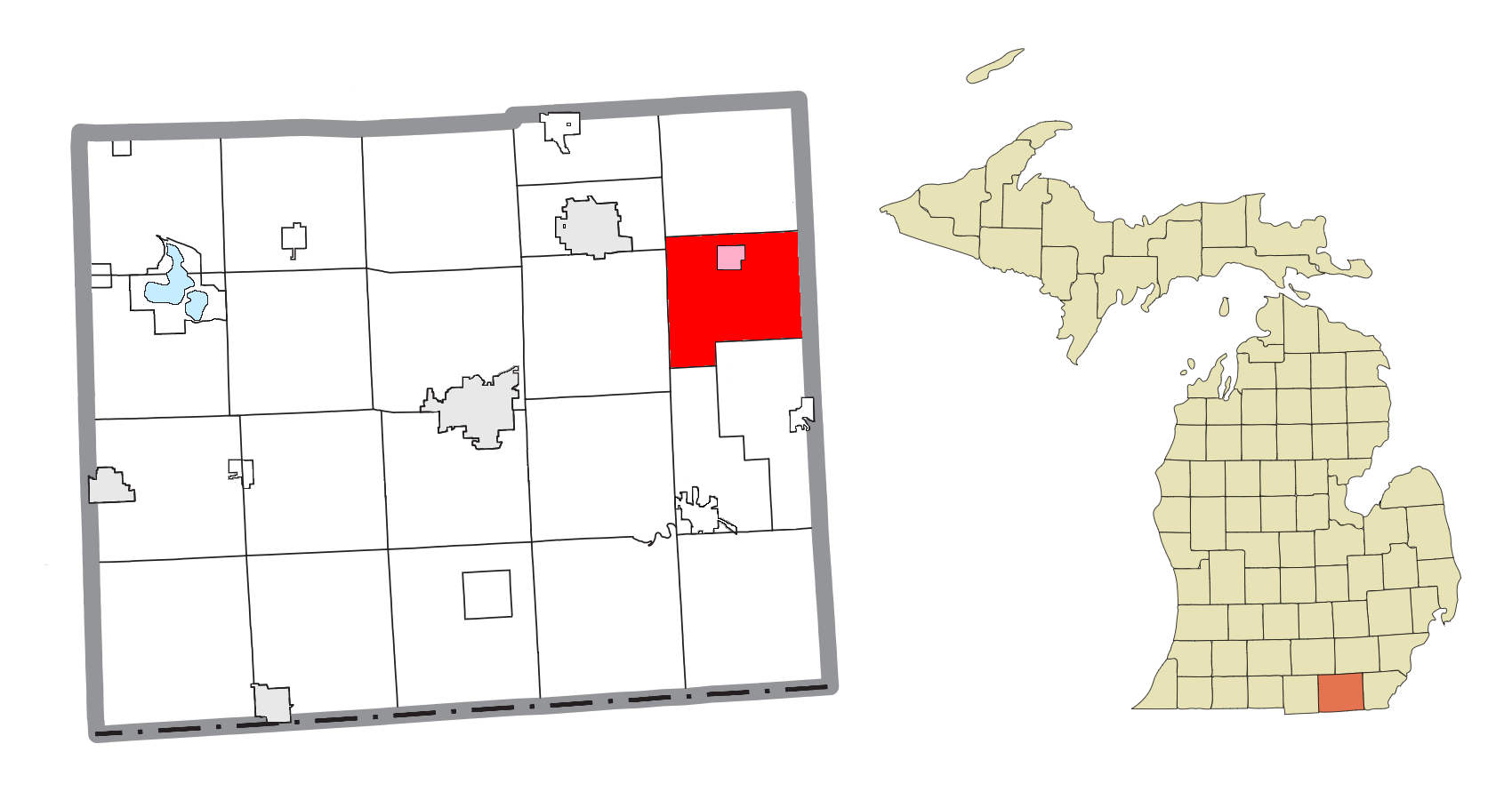
- Location within Lenawee County (red) and the administered village of Britton (pink)

- Location within the state of Michigan Ridgeway Township (the United States)
- Coordinates: 41°58′21″N 83°50′06″W
- Country: United States
- State: Michigan
- County: Lenawee

Government
  - Supervisor: Robert Downing
  - Clerk: Lora Feldkamp

Area
  - Total: 28.7 sq mi (74.3 km^{2})
  - Land: 28.6 sq mi (74.2 km^{2})
  - Water: 0.039 sq mi (0.1 km^{2})
- Elevation: 686 ft (209 m)

Population (2020)
  - Total: 1,535
  - Density: 53.6/sq mi (20.7/km^{2})
- Time zone: UTC-5 (Eastern (EST))
  - Summer (DST): UTC-4 (EDT)
- ZIP code(s): 49229 (Britton); 49238 (Deerfield); 49286 (Tecumseh)
- Area code: 517
- FIPS code: 26-68540
- GNIS feature ID: 1626979
- Website: https://ridgewaytownship.com/

Ridgeway Township is a civil township of Lenawee County in the U.S. state of Michigan. The population was 1,535 at the 2020 census. The unincorporated community of Ridgeway can be found within Ridgeway Township.

== Geography ==
According to the United States Census Bureau, the township has a total area of 28.7 square miles (74 km^{2}), of which 28.7 square miles (74 km^{2}) is land and 0.04 square miles (0.10 km^{2}) (0.10%) is water.

== Demographics ==
As of the census of 2000, there were 1,580 people, 576 households, and 449 families residing in the township. The population density was 55.1 inhabitants per square mile (21.3/km^{2}). There were 591 housing units at an average density of 20.6 per square mile (8.0/km^{2}). The racial makeup of the township was 97.47% White, 0.32% African American, 0.19% Native American, 0.32% Asian, 1.08% from other races, and 0.63% from two or more races. Hispanic or Latino of any race were 2.66% of the population.

There were 576 households, out of which 38.2% had children under the age of 18 living with them, 64.6% were married couples living together, 9.0% had a female householder with no husband present, and 22.0% were non-families. 18.4% of all households were made up of individuals, and 8.5% had someone living alone who was 65 years of age or older. The average household size was 2.74 and the average family size was 3.14.

In the township the population was spread out, with 28.5% under the age of 18, 7.5% from 18 to 24, 30.6% from 25 to 44, 21.8% from 45 to 64, and 11.6% who were 65 years of age or older. The median age was 36 years. For every 100 females, there were 96.3 males. For every 100 females age 18 and over, there were 96.3 males.

The median income for a household in the township was $50,642, and the median income for a family was $54,167. Males had a median income of $40,500 versus $26,181 for females. The per capita income for the township was $19,111. About 4.3% of families and 4.5% of the population were below the poverty line, including 5.2% of those under age 18 and 9.7% of those age 65 or over.

== Gallery ==
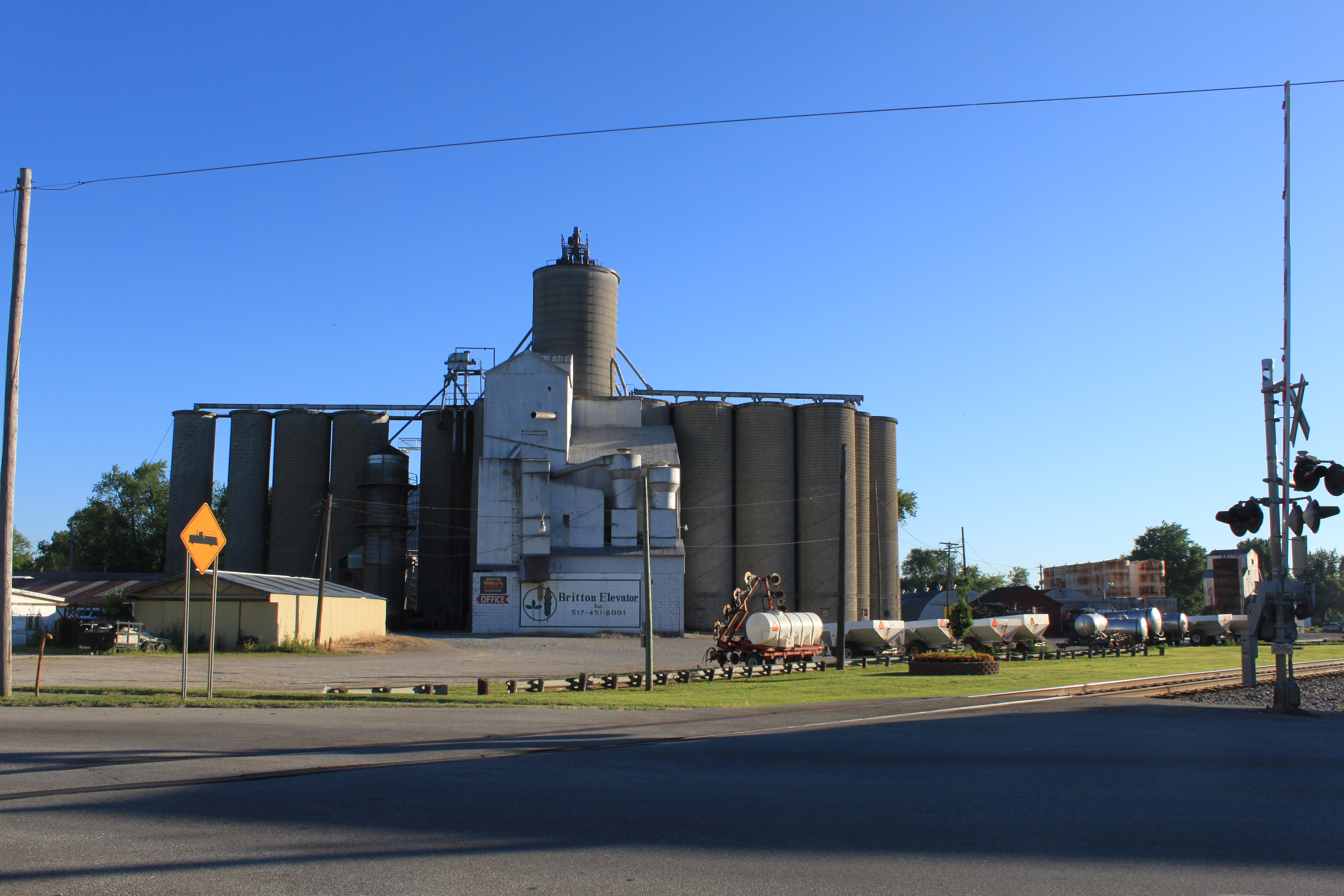
Britton Elevator Inc., N. Main St., Britton

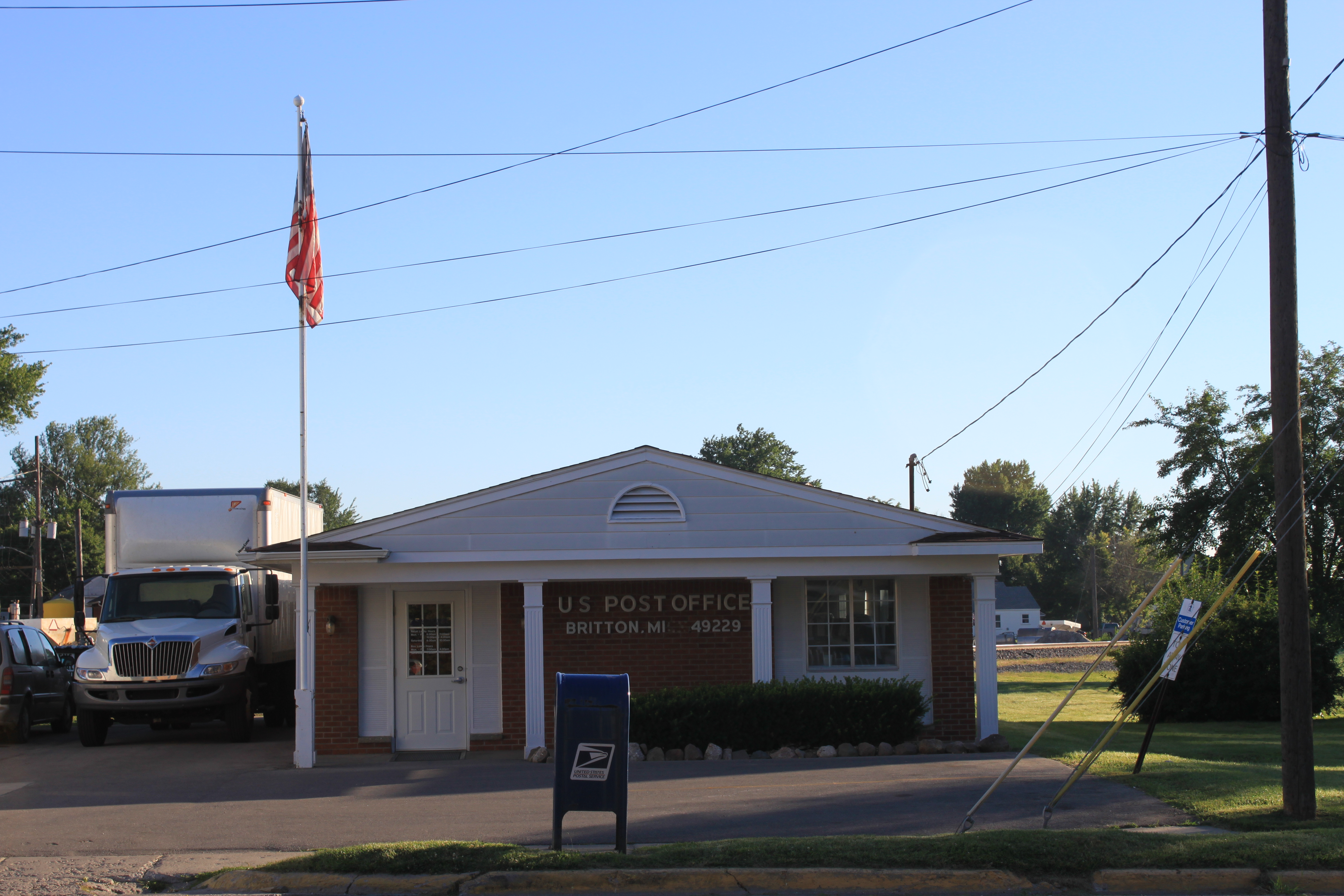
Britton Post office, E. Chicago Blvd., Britton

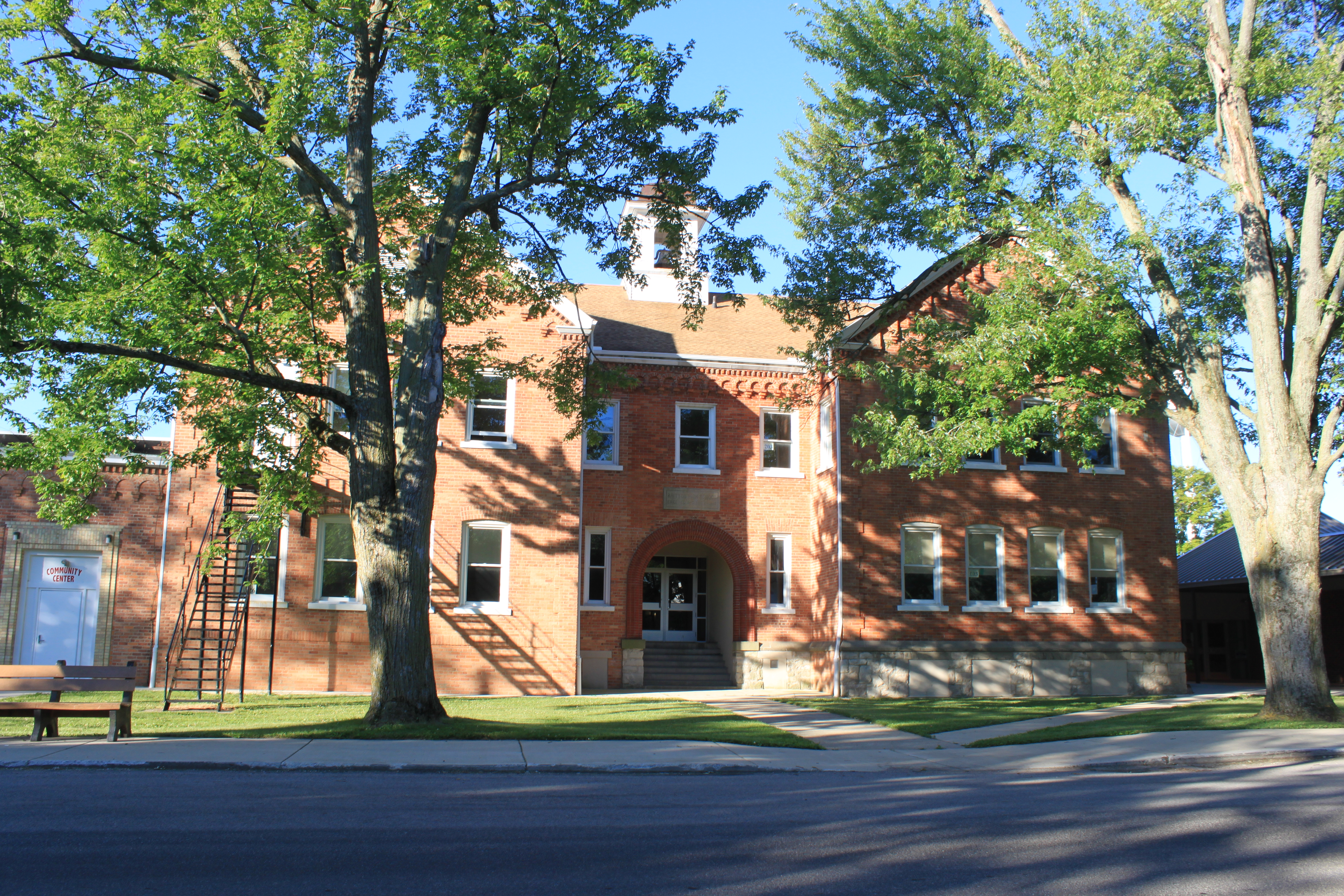
Britton High School, College Ave., Britton

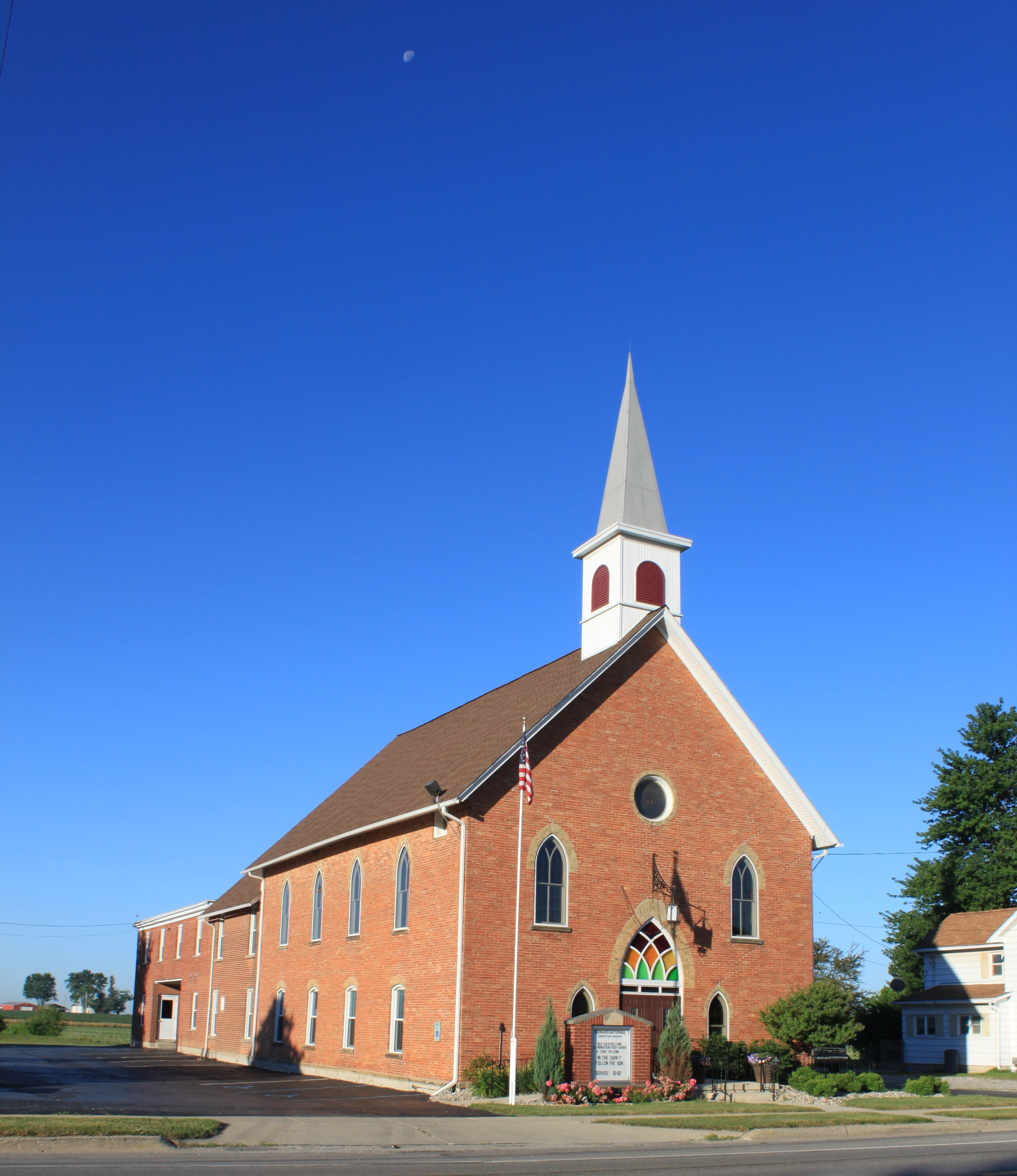
Congregational Christian Church, E. Chicago Blvd., Britton

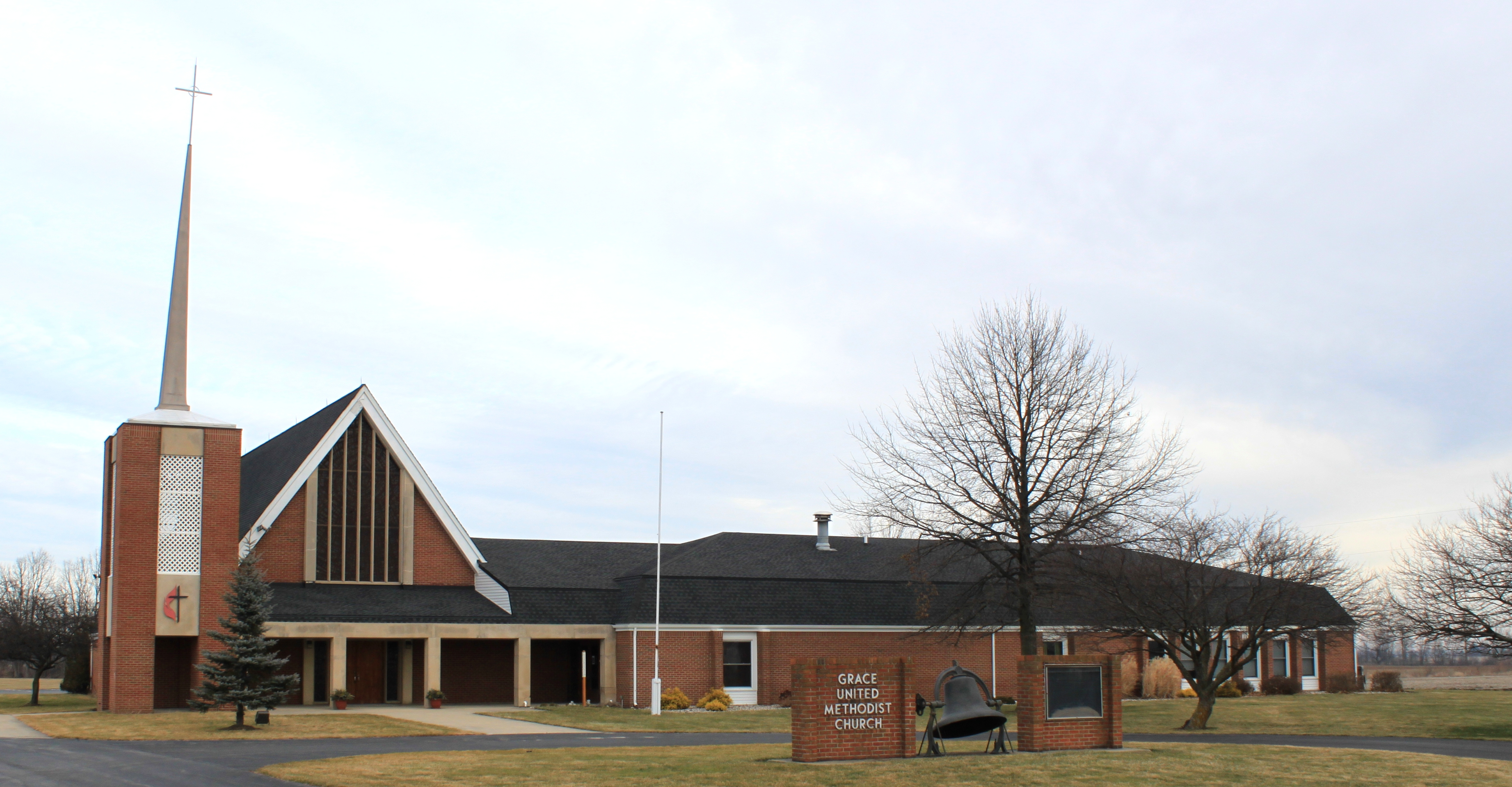
Grace United Methodist Church, E. Chicago Blvd.

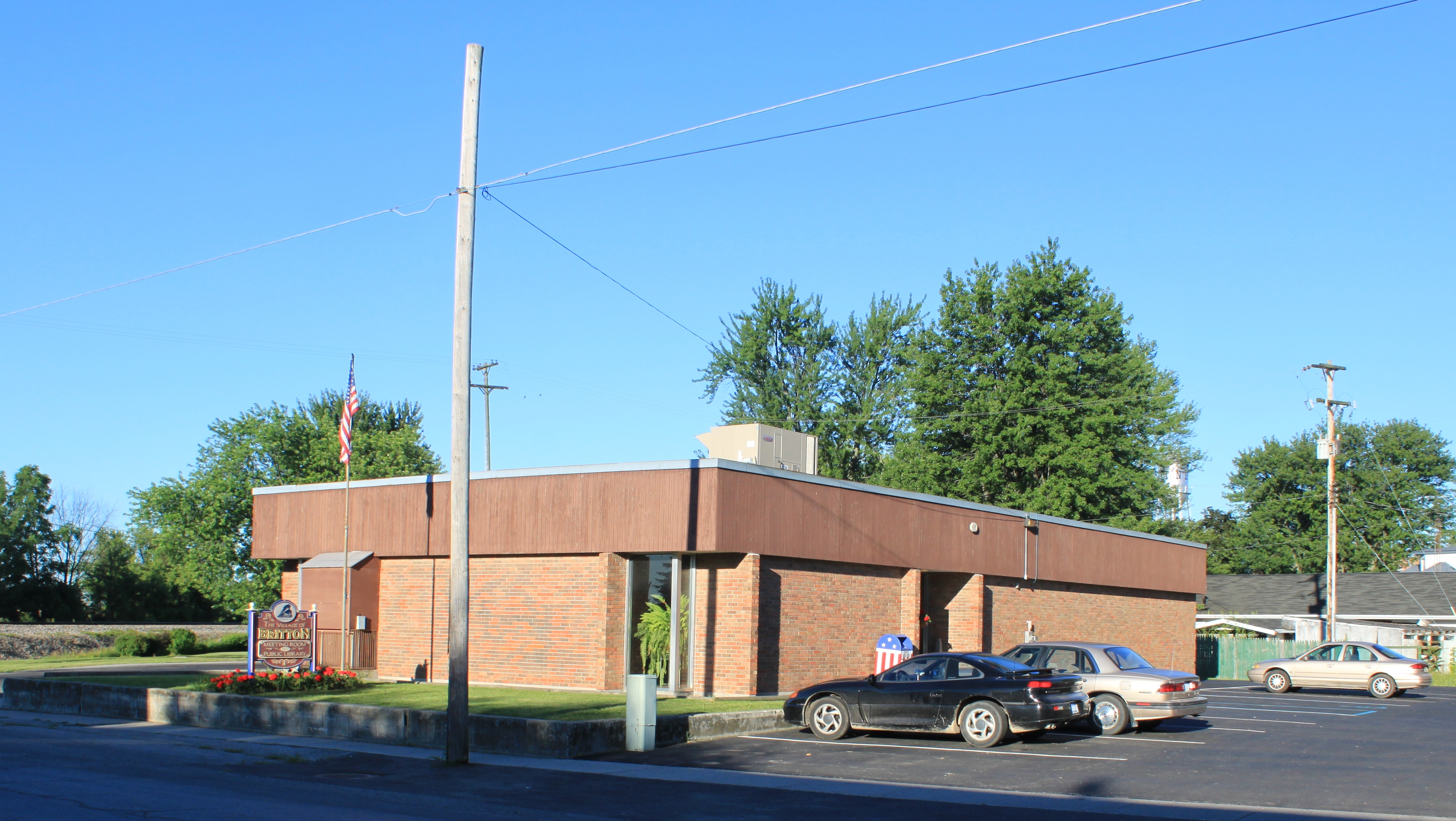
Britton Public Library, S. Main St., Britton

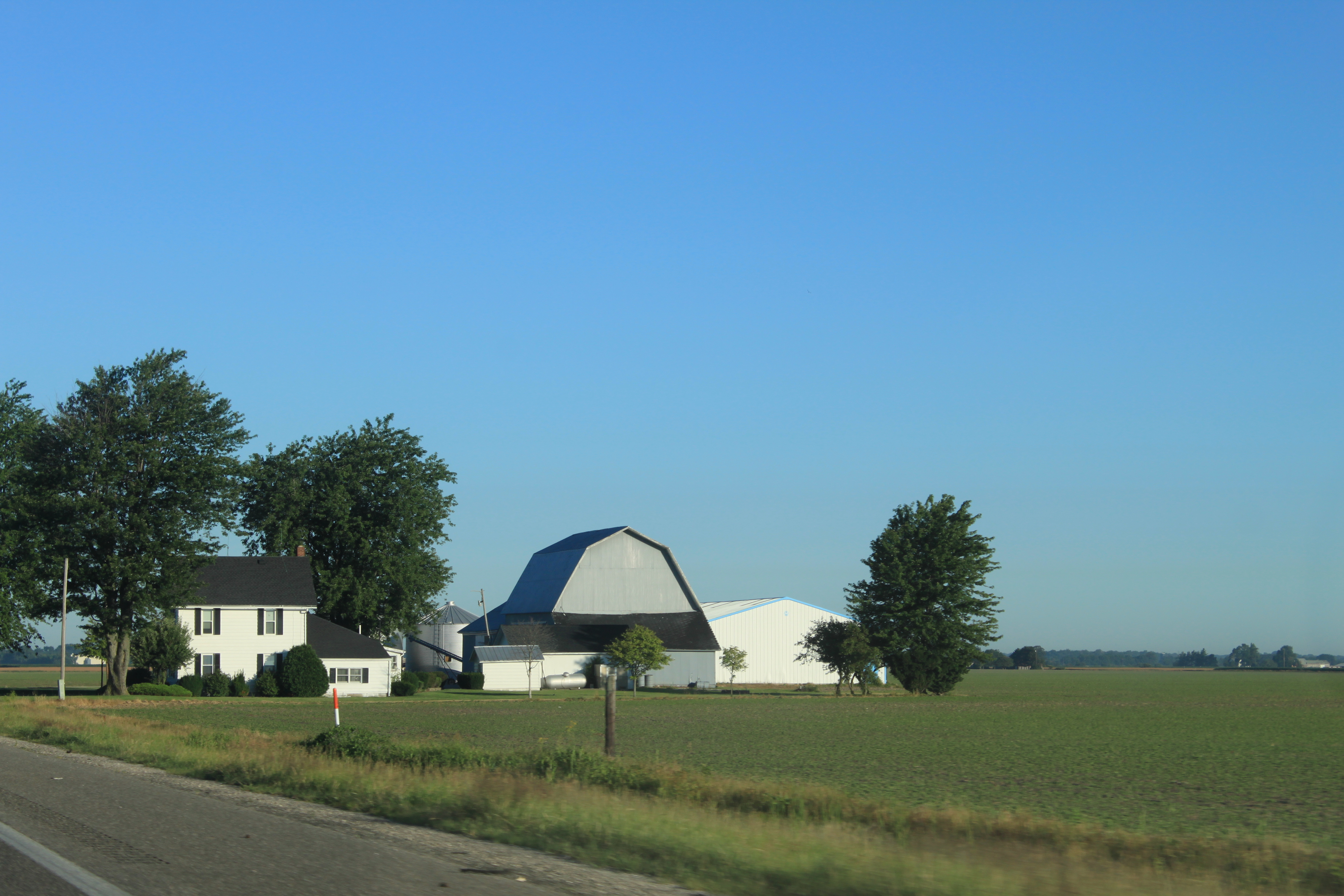
Farm on E. Monroe Rd.
