= Rome Township, Michigan =

- Civil township
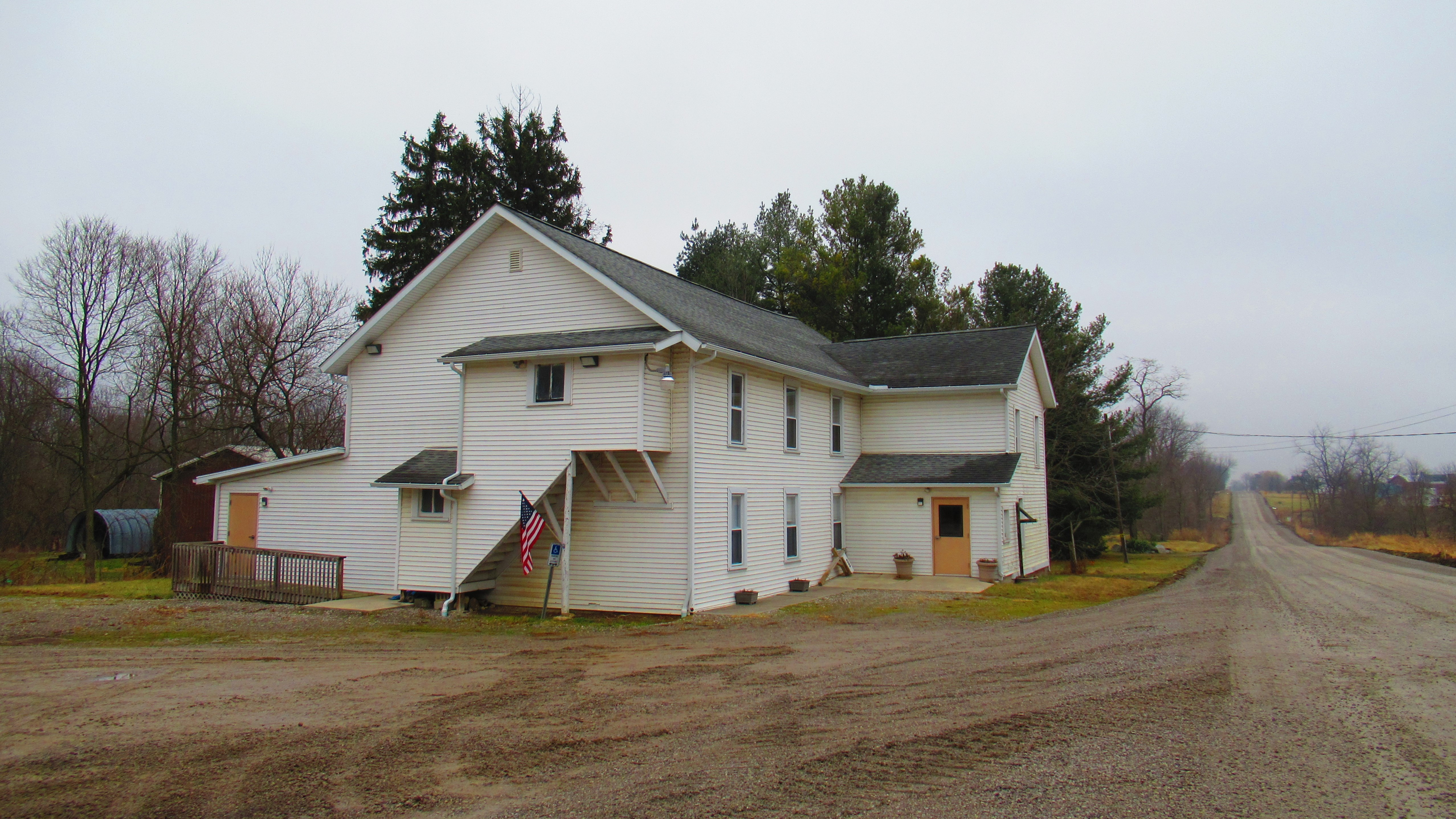
- Rome Township Hall on Forrister Road

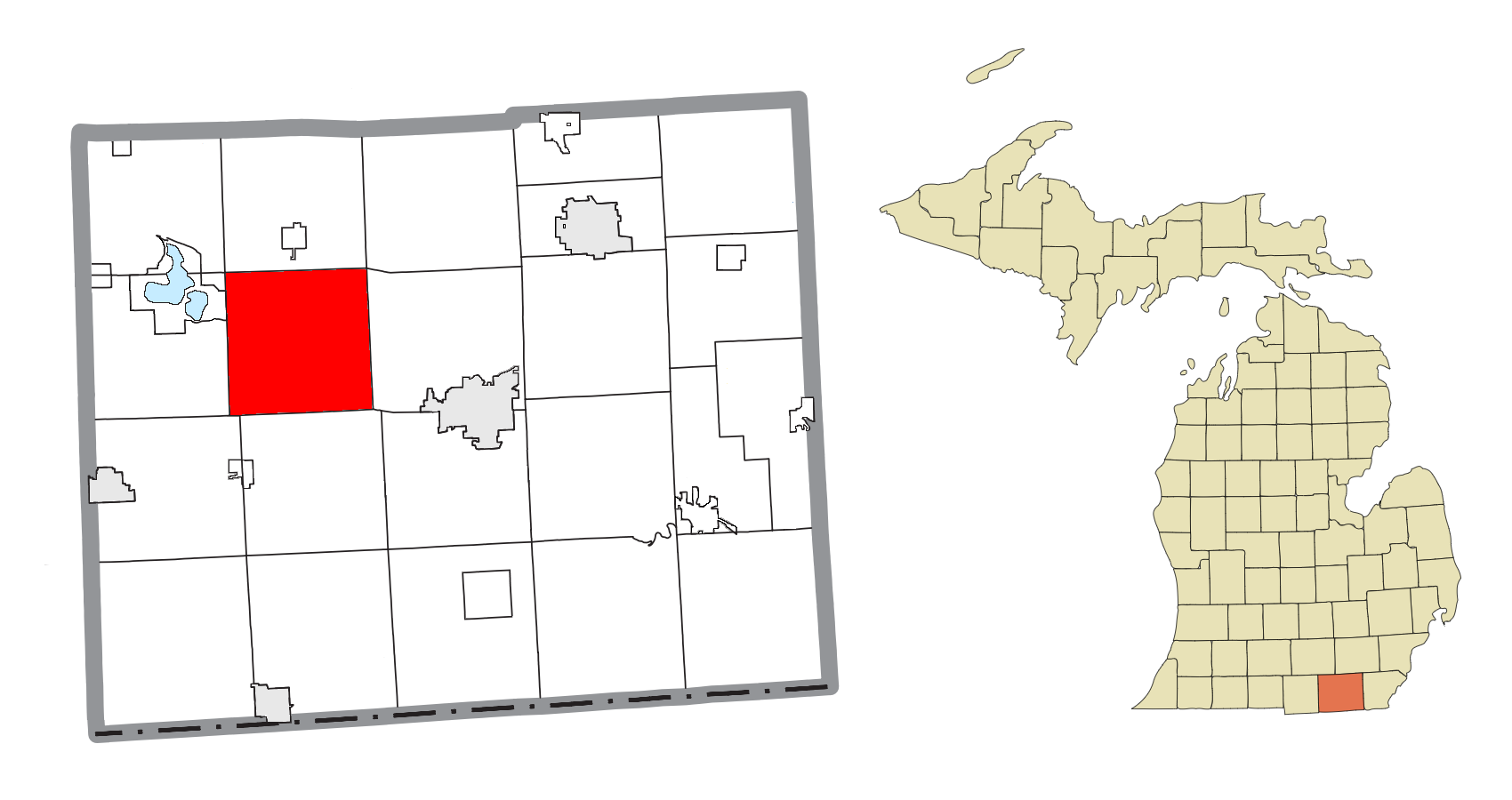
- Location within Lenawee County

- Location within the state of Michigan Rome Township (the United States)
- Coordinates: 41°56′37″N 84°11′11″W
- Country: United States
- State: Michigan
- County: Lenawee
- Established: 1834

Government
  - Supervisor: Bill Millner
  - Clerk: Robin Robertson

Area
  - Total: 35.9 sq mi (93.0 km^{2})
  - Land: 35.9 sq mi (92.9 km^{2})
  - Water: 0.039 sq mi (0.1 km^{2})
- Elevation: 896 ft (273 m)

Population (2020)
  - Total: 1,824
  - Density: 50.9/sq mi (19.6/km^{2})
- Time zone: UTC-5 (Eastern (EST))
  - Summer (DST): UTC-4 (EDT)
- ZIP code(s): 49221 (Adrian); 49235 (Clayton); 49253 (Manitou Beach); 49265 (Onsted)
- Area code: 517
- FIPS code: 26-69360
- GNIS feature ID: 1626999
- Website: www.rometownship.org

Rome Township is a civil township of Lenawee County in the U.S. state of Michigan. The population was 1,824 at the 2020 census.

== Geography ==
According to the United States Census Bureau, the township has a total area of 35.9 square miles (93 km^{2}), of which 35.9 square miles (93 km^{2}) is land and 0.04 square miles (0.10 km^{2}) (0.08%) is water.

== Demographics ==
As of the census of 2000, there were 1,772 people, 617 households, and 502 families residing in the township. The population density was 49.4 inhabitants per square mile (19.1/km^{2}). There were 643 housing units at an average density of 17.9 per square mile (6.9/km^{2}). The racial makeup of the township was 96.78% White, 0.28% African American, 0.68% Native American, 0.17% Asian, 0.62% from other races, and 1.47% from two or more races. Hispanic or Latino of any race were 3.27% of the population.

There were 617 households, out of which 37.4% had children under the age of 18 living with them, 71.6% were married couples living together, 5.5% had a female householder with no husband present, and 18.5% were non-families. 15.9% of all households were made up of individuals, and 6.6% had someone living alone who was 65 years of age or older. The average household size was 2.87 and the average family size was 3.20.

In the township the population was spread out, with 27.1% under the age of 18, 7.5% from 18 to 24, 29.5% from 25 to 44, 26.6% from 45 to 64, and 9.3% who were 65 years of age or older. The median age was 37 years. For every 100 females, there were 96.9 males. For every 100 females age 18 and over, there were 102.7 males.

The median income for a household in the township was $54,145, and the median income for a family was $58,558. Males had a median income of $41,912 versus $26,607 for females. The per capita income for the township was $20,715. About 1.8% of families and 3.9% of the population were below the poverty line, including 3.6% of those under age 18 and 11.8% of those age 65 or over.
