= Raisin Charter Township, Michigan =

Raisin Township, Michigan
- Charter township
- Raisin Charter Township
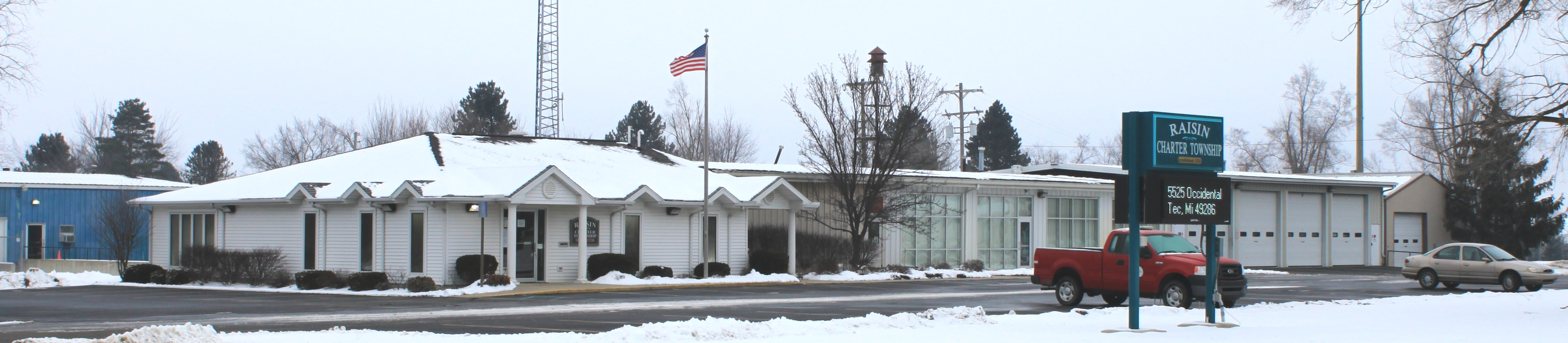
- Raisin Charter Township Offices

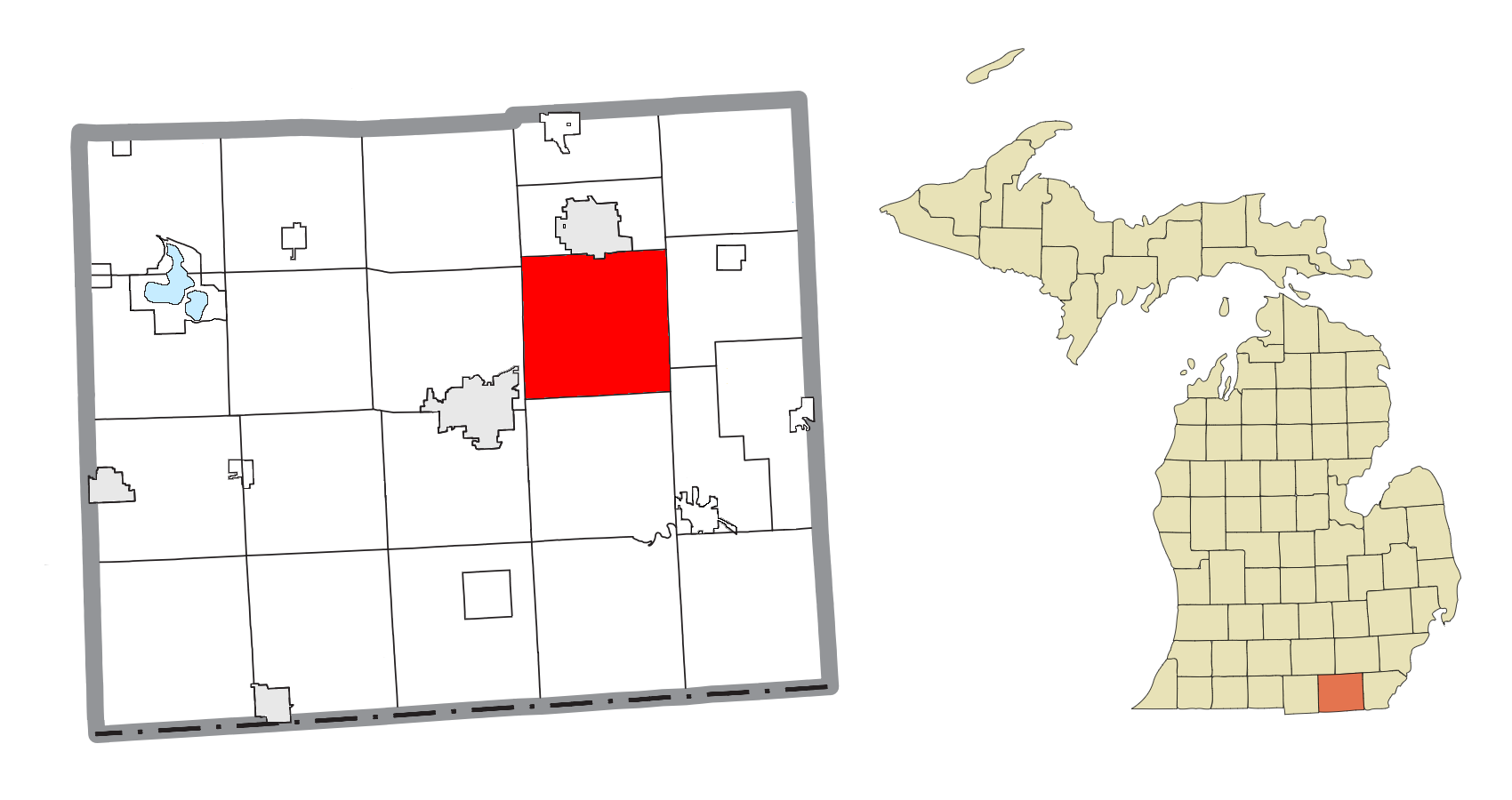
- Location within Lenawee County

- Location within the state of Michigan Location within the United States
- Coordinates: 41°56′42″N 83°56′45″W
- Country: United States
- State: Michigan
- County: Lenawee
- Established: 1826

Government
  - Supervisor: Thomas Hawkins
  - Clerk: Susan M. Bunch

Area
  - Total: 36.52 sq mi (94.59 km^{2})
  - Land: 36.13 sq mi (93.58 km^{2})
  - Water: 0.39 sq mi (1.01 km^{2})
- Elevation: 732 ft (223 m)

Population (2020)
  - Total: 7,900
  - Density: 218.7/sq mi (84.4/km^{2})
- Time zone: UTC-5 (Eastern (EST))
  - Summer (DST): UTC-4 (EDT)
- ZIP code(s): 49221 (Adrian); 49229 (Britton); 49268 (Palmyra); 49286 (Tecumseh)
- Area code: 517
- FIPS code: 26-66840
- GNIS feature ID: 1626950
- Website: Official website

Raisin Charter Township is a charter township of Lenawee County in the U.S. state of Michigan. The population was 7,900 at the 2020 census.

== Communities ==
- Birdsall is an unincorporated community located along M-52 on the western border of the township with Adrian Township at 41°56′31″N 84°00′16″W.
- East Raisin is a former settlement located in the eastern portion of the township. It was first settled in 1825 by Noah Norton and soon grew when more settlers moved to the area.
- Holloway is an unincorporated community located in the southeast portion of the township at 41°56′06″N 83°54′52″W. The community was founded in 1881 when the Wabash Railroad constructed a line through the area. It was originally named Butler after Butler Holloway, who was a real estate agent who first sold the lots of land. When a post office was established on July 19, 1881, there was already a Butler post office in the state, so the name Holloway was used instead. The post office operated until May 25, 1962.
- Raisin is a former settlement that contained its own post office from September 9, 1835, until March 22, 1855. Like the township and many other locations, it was named after the French word for grape, which were abundant in the area along the River Raisin.
- Raisin Center (or Raisin Centre) is an unincorporated community located in the center of the township at 41°55′44″N 83°57′12″W. When immigrants moved to the area in 1831, it became a prominent Quaker region. A post office opened here on June 9, 1868, and operated until November 29, 1902. The community once contained a station named Chase's when the Lake Shore and Michigan Southern Railroad built a line through the area in 1878.

== Geography ==
According to the U.S. Census Bureau, the township has a total area of 36.52 square miles (94.59 km^{2}), of which 36.13 square miles (93.58 km^{2}) is land and 0.39 square miles (1.01 km^{2}) (1.07%) is water.

The River Raisin flows through the township.

=== Major highways ===
- M-52 (North Adrian Highway) runs along part of the western boundary of the township.

== Demographics ==
At the 2000 census, there were 6,507 people, 2,265 households and 1,845 families residing in the township. The population density was 179.5 inhabitants per square mile (69.3/km^{2}). There were 2,347 housing units at an average density of 64.7 per square mile (25.0/km^{2}). The racial makeup of the township was 96.00% White, 0.54% African American, 0.43% Native American, 0.49% Asian, 1.54% from other races, and 1.00% from two or more races. Hispanic or Latino of any race were 4.81% of the population.

There were 2,265 households, of which 40.1% had children under the age of 18 living with them, 71.5% were married couples living together, 7.1% had a female householder with no husband present, and 18.5% were non-families. 15.1% of all households were made up of individuals, and 5.4% had someone living alone who was 65 years of age or older. The average household size was 2.85 and the average family size was 3.17.

28.7% of the population were under the age of 18, 6.8% from 18 to 24, 29.5% from 25 to 44, 26.4% from 45 to 64, and 8.5% who were 65 years of age or older. The median age was 36 years. For every 100 females, there were 97.4 males. For every 100 females age 18 and over, there were 98.6 males.

The median household income was $57,088 and the median family income was $59,977. Males had a median income of $44,973 vand females $25,614. The per capita income was $21,703. About 1.9% of families and 2.9% of the population were below the poverty line, including 1.2% of those under age 18 and 7.1% of those age 65 or over.

== Education ==
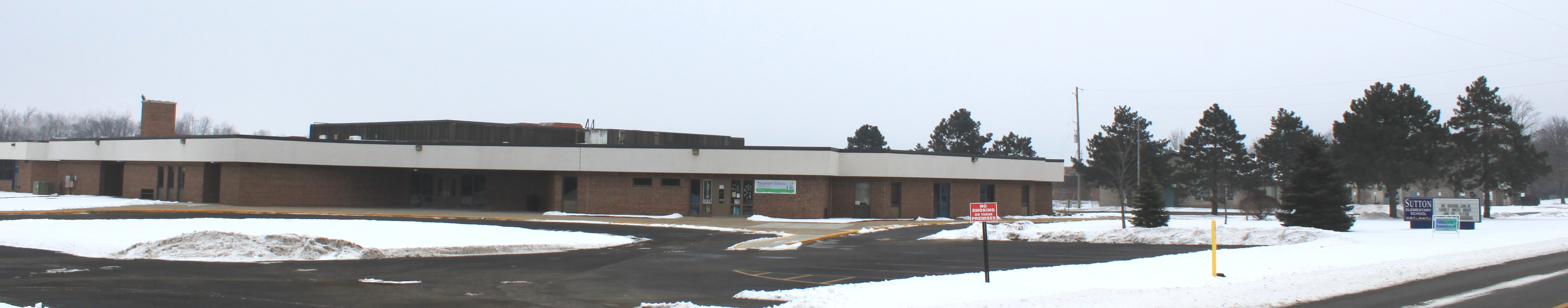
Sutton Elementary School

The township is served by four separate public school districts. The majority of the township is served by Tecumseh Public Schools to the north in the city of Tecumseh. The southwest portion of the township is served by Adrian Public Schools. A small portion of the southeast corner is served by Blissfield Community Schools, while another very small portion in the southeast area of the township is served by Britton Deerfield School District.
