= Tecumseh, Michigan =

- City
- City of Tecumseh
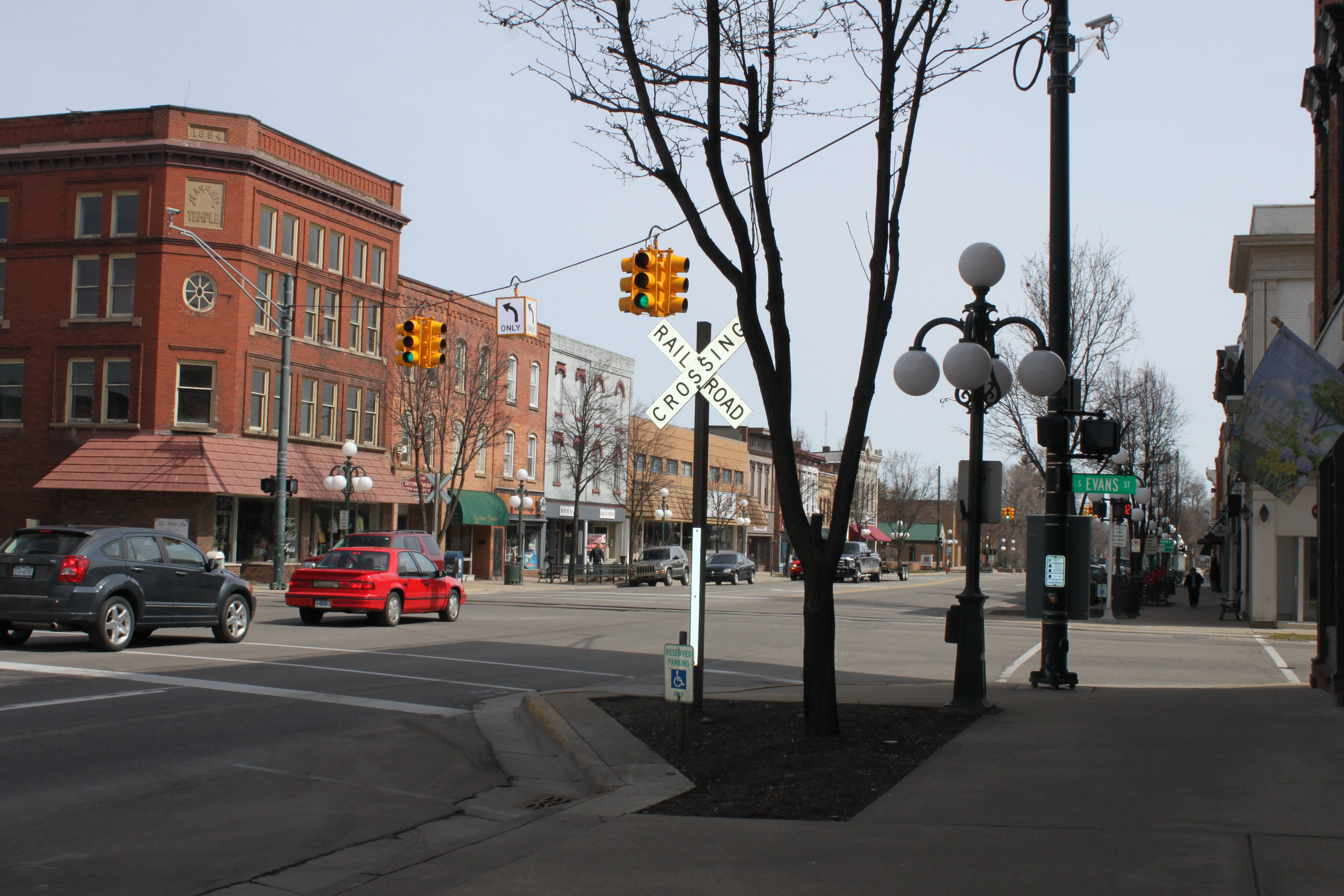
- Downtown along Chicago Boulevard (M-50)

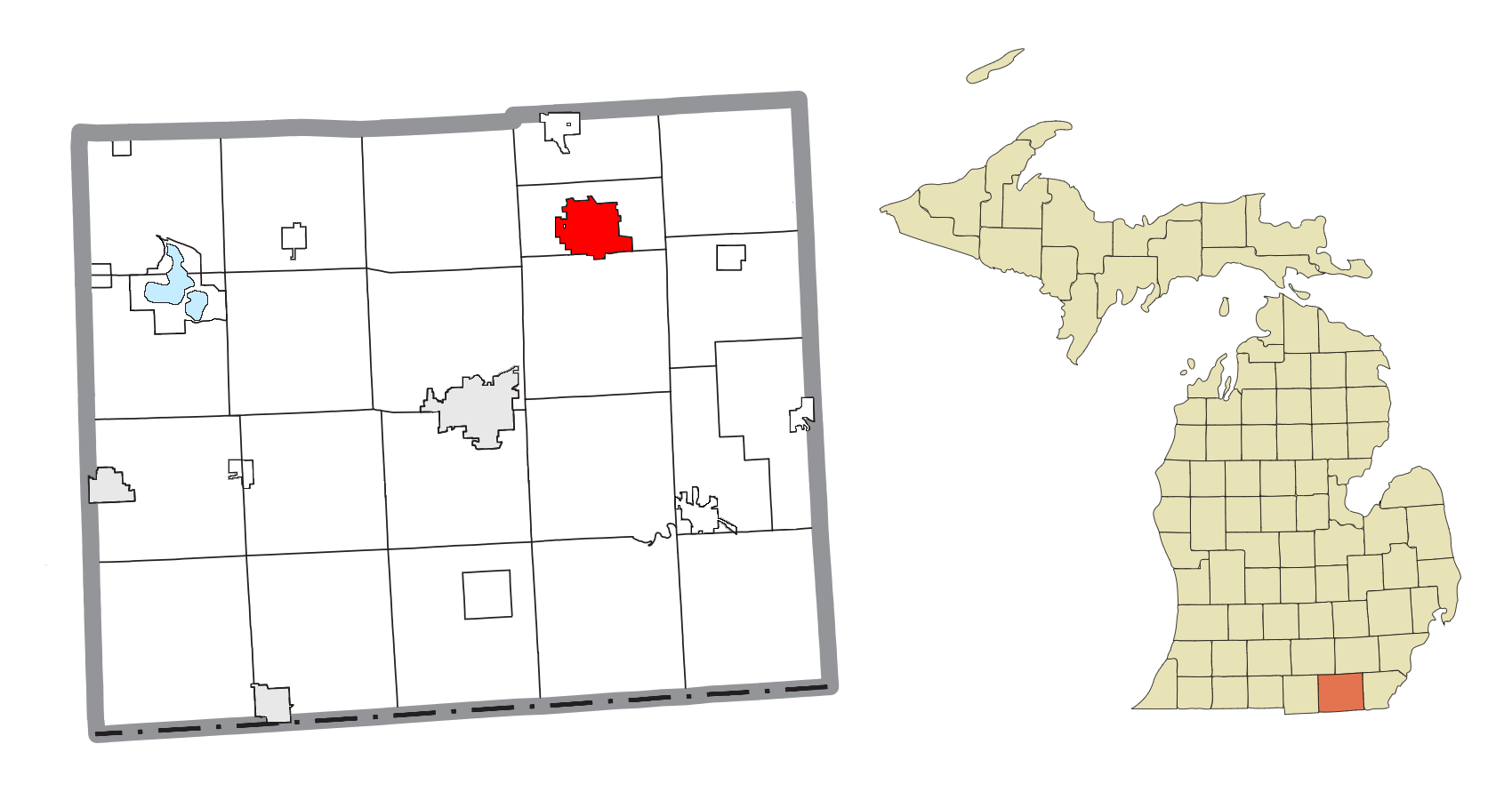
- Location within Lenawee County

- Location in Michigan Location in the United States
- Coordinates: 42°00′22″N 83°56′58″W
- Country: United States
- State: Michigan
- County: Lenawee
- Settled: 1824

Government
  - Type: Council–manager
  - Mayor: Brian Radant
  - Manager: Brett Coker

Area
  - Total: 5.89 sq mi (15.26 km^{2})
  - Land: 5.65 sq mi (14.63 km^{2})
  - Water: 0.24 sq mi (0.63 km^{2})
- Elevation: 804 ft (245 m)

Population (2020)
  - Total: 8,680
  - Density: 1,536.4/sq mi (593.22/km^{2})
- Time zone: UTC−5 (Eastern (EST))
  - Summer (DST): UTC−4 (EDT)
- ZIP code(s): 49286
- Area code: 517
- FIPS code: 26-79120
- GNIS feature ID: 1614652
- Website: www.mytecumseh.org

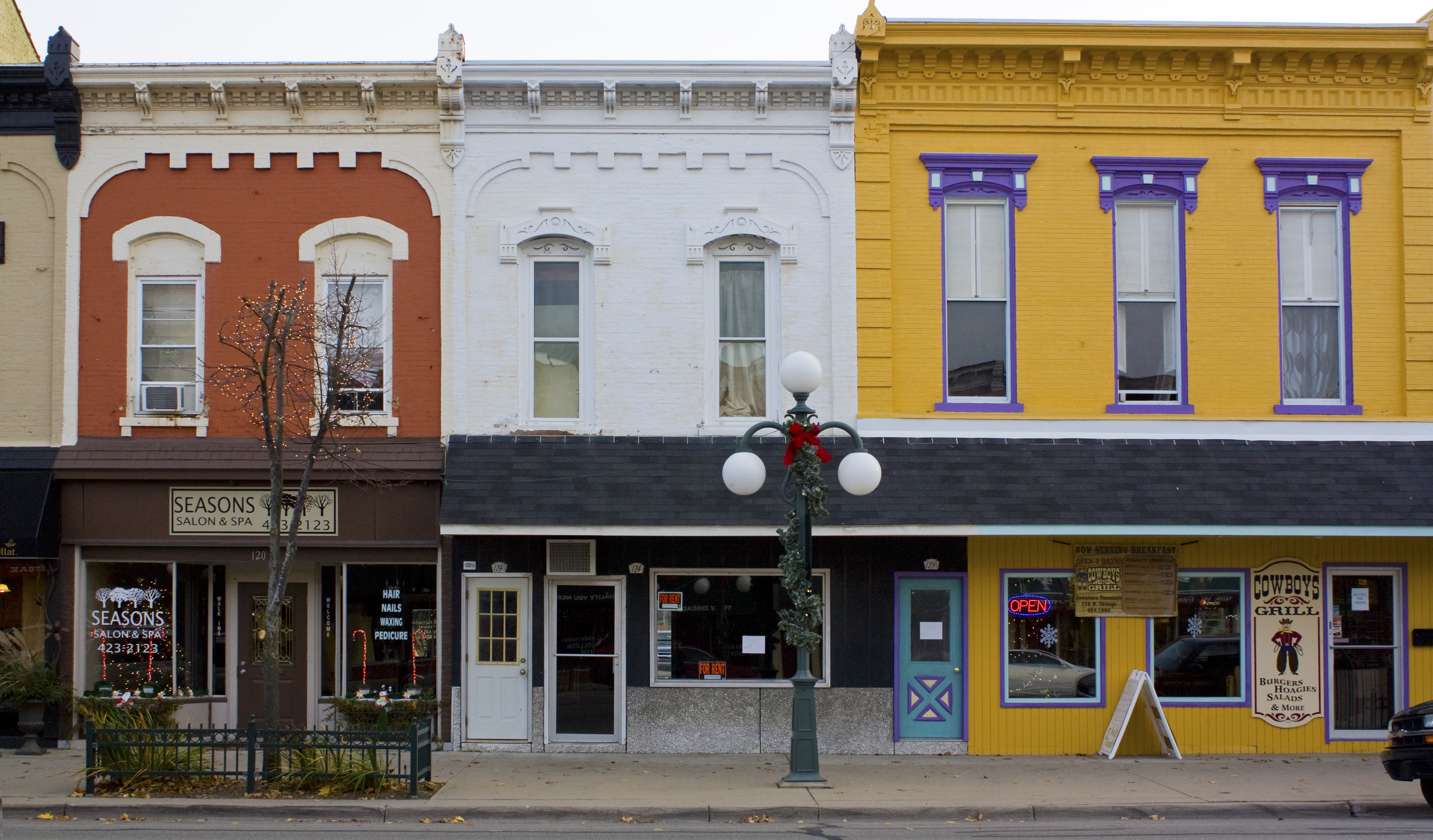
Shops in Downtown Tecumseh

Tecumseh (/təˈkʌmˌsi/ tə-CUM-see) is a city in Lenawee County in the U.S. state of Michigan, near the River Raisin. Tecumseh is about 60 miles (97 km) southwest of Detroit, 25 miles (40 km) south of Ann Arbor, and 40 miles (64 km) north of Toledo, Ohio. The main street of downtown is Chicago Boulevard, also designated as M-50. It crosses the River Raisin a few miles east of M-52.

As of the 2020 census, Tecumseh had a population of 8,680.

The city is surrounded on three sides by Tecumseh Township, but the two are politically independent. Raisin Township borders the southern edge of the city. In 2009 the city was rated by CNNMoney as #93 among the 100 best small towns to live in.

== History ==
The boundaries of Lenawee County were laid out by a proclamation of the Territorial Governor, Lewis Cass, on September 10, 1822. Lenawee remained attached to Monroe County, out of which it was formed, until an act of the Territorial Legislature passed on December 26, 1826, organized the county government.

The first Anglo-American settlement in the county was made two years earlier, on May 21, 1824, in Tecumseh. The settlers, consisting of fifteen men, eleven women, and six children, all came from Jefferson County, New York along Lake Erie. In 1823, Musgrove Evans had located the land and persuaded General Joseph W. Brown and the others to move to the site. Brown and Evans, along with Austin Eli Wing, purchased land there and platted the village of Tecumseh in 1824.

These founders appealed to Governor Cass to locate the county seat of Lenawee at Tecumseh. This was accomplished by an act of the Territorial Legislature on June 30, 1824, although county government was not organized for another year and a half. The city was named after Shawnee chief Tecumseh, whose people had historically controlled that territory.

Tecumseh remained the county seat until 1838, when it was transferred to Adrian. The Township of Tecumseh was organized on April 12, 1837, initially encompassing the entire northern third of the county.

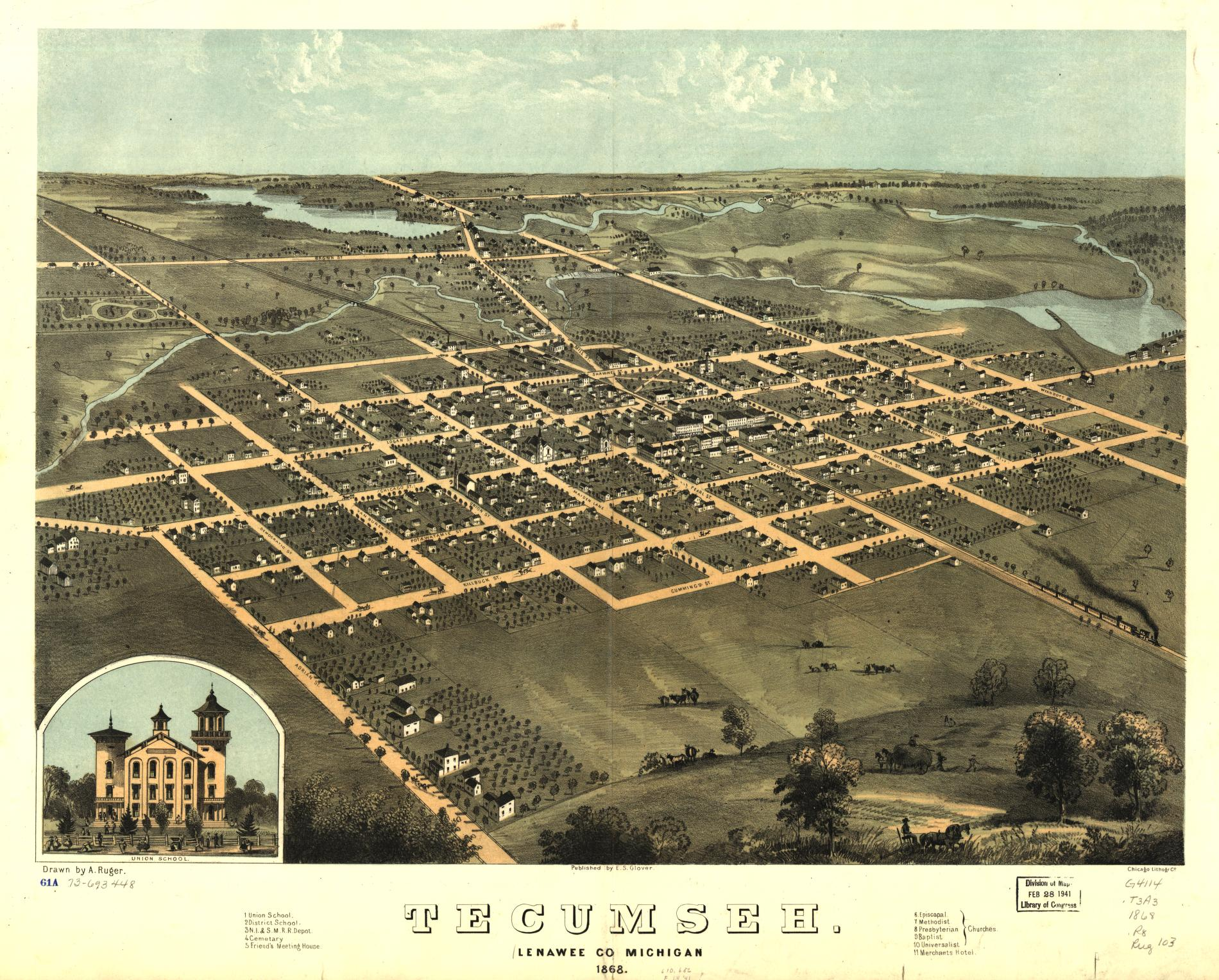
Panoramic map of Tecumseh, 1868

Just to the north of Tecumseh, the village of Brownville was established in 1823 by Austin Wing. It was annexed by Tecumseh in 1838.

== Geography ==
This 1848 drawing of the famous Chief Tecumseh was based on a sketch made in 1808.

Tecumseh is located in Southeast Michigan. According to the United States Census Bureau, the city has a total area of 5.94 square miles (15.38 km^{2}), of which 5.70 square miles (14.76 km^{2}) is land and 0.24 square miles (0.62 km^{2}) is water.

== Demographics ==
Historical population
Census	Pop.	Note	%±
1850	1,670		—
1860	1,640		−1.8%
1870	2,039		24.3%
1880	2,111		3.5%
1890	2,310		9.4%
1900	2,400		3.9%
1910	2,332		−2.8%
1920	2,432		4.3%
1930	2,456		1.0%
1940	2,921		18.9%
1950	4,020		37.6%
1960	7,045		75.2%
1970	7,120		1.1%
1980	7,320		2.8%
1990	7,462		1.9%
2000	8,574		14.9%
2010	8,521		−0.6%
2020	8,680		1.9%
2021 (est.)	8,648		−0.4%
U.S. Decennial Census

=== 2020 census ===
As of the 2020 census, Tecumseh had a population of 8,680. The median age was 44.6 years. 20.1% of residents were under the age of 18 and 23.1% of residents were 65 years of age or older. For every 100 females there were 89.7 males, and for every 100 females age 18 and over there were 85.8 males age 18 and over.

98.5% of residents lived in urban areas, while 1.5% lived in rural areas.

There were 3,835 households in Tecumseh, of which 24.5% had children under the age of 18 living in them. Of all households, 45.0% were married-couple households, 17.3% were households with a male householder and no spouse or partner present, and 31.1% were households with a female householder and no spouse or partner present. About 34.4% of all households were made up of individuals and 17.0% had someone living alone who was 65 years of age or older.

There were 4,087 housing units, of which 6.2% were vacant. The homeowner vacancy rate was 1.4% and the rental vacancy rate was 6.2%.

Racial composition as of the 2020 census
Race	Number	Percent
White	7,828	90.2%
Black or African American	52	0.6%
American Indian and Alaska Native	38	0.4%
Asian	54	0.6%
Native Hawaiian and Other Pacific Islander	0	0.0%
Some other race	135	1.6%
Two or more races	573	6.6%
Hispanic or Latino (of any race)	499	5.7%

=== 2010 census ===
As of the census of 2010, there were 8,521 people, 3,604 households, and 2,304 families residing in the city. The population density was 1,494.9 inhabitants per square mile (577.2/km^{2}). There were 3,957 housing units at an average density of 694.2 per square mile (268.0/km^{2}). The racial makeup of the city was 96.0% White, 0.4% African American, 0.4% Native American, 0.7% Asian, 0.8% from other races, and 1.6% from two or more races. Hispanic or Latino of any race were 4.4% of the population.

There were 3,604 households, of which 32.4% had children under the age of 18 living with them, 49.0% were married couples living together, 11.3% had a female householder with no husband present, 3.6% had a male householder with no wife present, and 36.1% were non-families. 31.2% of all households were made up of individuals, and 14.1% had someone living alone who was 65 years of age or older. The average household size was 2.35 and the average family size was 2.96.

The median age in the city was 39.8 years. 24.7% of residents were under the age of 18; 7.1% were between the ages of 18 and 24; 25.4% were from 25 to 44; 27.4% were from 45 to 64; and 15.5% were 65 years of age or older. The gender makeup of the city was 46.8% male and 53.2% female.

=== 2000 census ===
As of the census of 2000, there were 8,574 people, 3,499 households, and 2,337 families residing in the city. The population density was 1,659.4 inhabitants per square mile (640.7/km^{2}). There were 3,651 housing units at an average density of 706.6 per square mile (272.8/km^{2}). The racial makeup of the city was 95.85% White, 0.19% African American, 0.63% Native American, 0.69% Asian, 0.01% Pacific Islander, 1.49% from other races, and 1.14% from two or more races. Hispanic or Latino of any race were 4.40% of the population.

There were 3,499 households, out of which 33.9% had children under the age of 18 living with them, 52.8% were married couples living together, 10.5% had a female householder with no husband present, and 33.2% were non-families. 28.5% of all households were made up of individuals, and 12.2% had someone living alone who was 65 years of age or older. The average household size was 2.42 and the average family size was 2.99.

In the city, the population was spread out, with 26.4% under the age of 18, 7.5% from 18 to 24, 29.4% from 25 to 44, 21.5% from 45 to 64, and 15.1% who were 65 years of age or older. The median age was 36 years. For every 100 females, there were 92.6 males. For every 100 females age 18 and over, there were 87.2 males.

The median income for a household in the city was $46,106, and the median income for a family was $58,239. Males had a median income of $39,672 versus $27,630 for females. The per capita income for the city was $22,797. About 3.5% of families and 4.9% of the population were below the poverty line, including 3.9% of those under age 18 and 7.4% of those age 65 or over.

== Economy ==
One of the village's best known manufacturers was Tecumseh Products. Founded by the Herrick family during the early part of the 20th century, Tecumseh Products initially began business manufacturing refrigeration compressors, leading Tecumseh to be known as the "Refrigeration Capital of the World." The company moved out of Tecumseh in 2008. It moved its remaining production to a plant in Tupelo, Mississippi, where labor costs were lower because workers were unorganized. It moved its headquarters to Pittsfield Township, Michigan, just outside Ann Arbor, where the University of Michigan is based.

Consolidated Biscuit Company of McComb, Ohio, agreed to buy the Products plant in 2008, pending an environmental review. But, the deal fell through after Consolidated Biscuit Company was sold. The site was found to be contaminated and cleanup begun in 2017. The land was purchased by a local developer - 100 E. Patterson LLC - with plans to clean up the land to brownfield status and develop mixed-use space for light industrial, commercial and retail. The State of Michigan Department of Environmental Quality (MDEQ) awarded the City of Tecumseh $2,000,000 in funding to aid the developer in cleanup efforts.

At the end of 2018, demolition at the site was nearly complete and cleanup efforts were underway with new industrial building construction planned for 2019.

Overall, the City of Tecumseh's economy has more than 250 businesses, ranging from Tier 1 Automotive Suppliers to small, locally owned bakeries and shoe stores. The downtown along Chicago Boulevard is thriving with businesses ranging from antiques, breweries and wineries, retail, restaurants, customer jewelers, locally owned department stores and more.

City of Tecumseh Largest Employers - 2018
Company	Industry	Employees
Kirchhoff Automotive	Automotive Supplier	952
Tecumseh Public Schools	Education	335
Busch's Tecumseh	Grocery	97
GLOVE Enterprises	Injection Molding	85
Ervin Industries	Metal Blasting	61
City of Tecumseh	Government Services	52
Ididit	Custom Automotive	50
Tuckey's Big Boy	Restaurant	44
Old National Bank	Finance/Banking	43
Howard Hanna	Real Estate	40
Tecumseh Packaging Solutions	Packaging Manufacturing	35
Glycon	Plastics Processing	35
Evans Street Station	Restaurant	35
Martin's Home Center	Retail/Hardware	30
Basil Boys	Restaurant	30
Spectrum Printers	Commercial Printing	21
Diggypod	Custom Printing	21

== Arts and culture ==
=== Annual cultural events ===
In 2010, the city began hosting the Tecumseh Ice Sculpting Festival in the downtown area on the penultimate weekend in January. Another festival is Appleumpkin (held the second weekend in October to celebrate harvest); it attracts approximately 30,000 tourists annually from around the region.

The city of Tecumseh holds several other events each year, such as the Classic Car and Bike Show, Divas at Dusk, Holiday Open House, Annual Pet Parade and Sidewalk Sales.

Tecumseh celebrates the annual Art Trail. This features sculptures throughout Tecumseh, which are changed on an annual basis. The related annual Art Walk pairs local artists and merchants.

The Carnegie Preservation League is a local non-profit that saved a historical landmark building and renovated it to create lofts and gallery space for local artists.

=== Tourism ===
The Southern Michigan Railroad Society operates a railroad as a living museum; the route runs through Tecumseh.

Tourists also come for the city's proximity to the Michigan International Speedway (M.I.S.). The M-50 corridor has many antique dealers, cafes and fine dining restaurants.

== Education ==
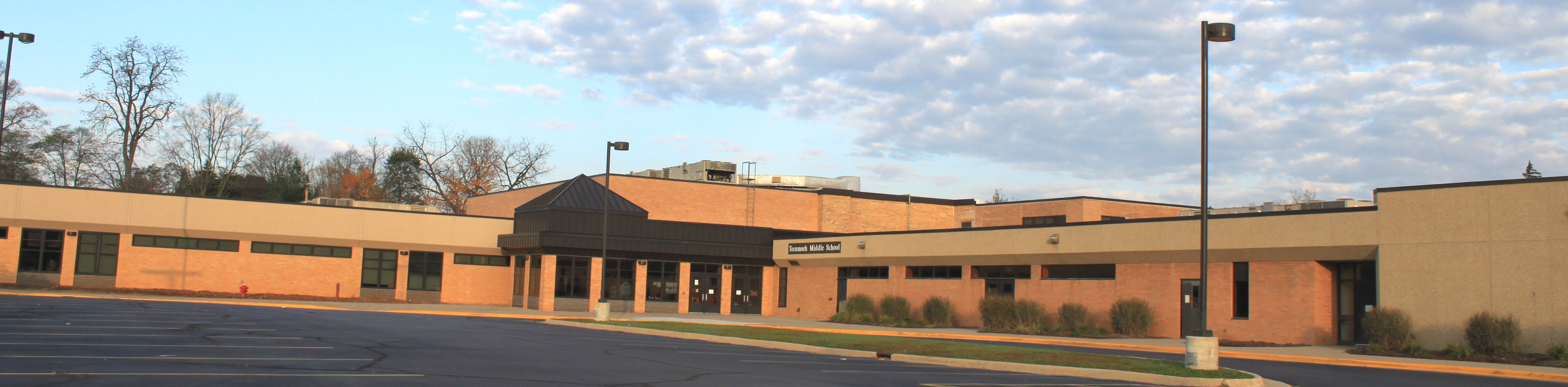
Tecumseh Middle School

The city of Tecumseh is home to Tecumseh Public Schools. The system includes one traditional high school, Tecumseh High School (grades 9–12); one alternative high school, Tecumseh Alternative High School; one middle school, Tecumseh Middle School (grades 5-8); two early education elementary (grades Y5, K-2) schools, Sutton Early Learning Center and Tecumseh Acres Early Learning Center; and two intermediate elementary (grades 3-4) schools, Patterson Intermediate Learning Center and Herrick Park Intermediate Learning Center.

Tecumseh students have access to the Lenawee Intermediate School District (LISD) and the Southern Michigan Center for Science and Industry. Tecumseh Public Schools seeks to provide myriad educational opportunities to create a work-ready workforce, including industry-specific programs to focus on the needs of area businesses.

Tecumseh Public Schools has a graduation rate of 96.84%, with more than 65% of graduates enrolling in post-secondary education. Tecumseh's central location provides easy access to major universities, including the top 10 that graduates choose: Jackson College, Washtenaw Community College, Eastern Michigan University, Michigan State University, Central Michigan University, Siena Heights University, Western Michigan University, the University of Michigan, all in Michigan, and the University of Toledo in Ohio.

== Infrastructure ==
=== Highways ===
- M-50
- M-52

== Notable people ==
- Fernando C. Beaman, politician and former US Congressmen, practiced law in Tecumseh in the 1800s.
- Sam Benschoter, Major League Baseball Pitcher, went to school at Tecumseh High School
- Ronald Crane, historian and literary critic, was born in Tecumseh.
- Andrew Kehoe, mass murderer, was born and raised in Tecumseh. He perpetrated the Bath School disaster in Bath, Michigan, killing 45 people, including himself.
- Julie Parrish, nee Joyce Wilbur, actress, grew up in Tecumseh from the age of 11. She graduated from Tecumseh High School, and later became a model and actress.
- Jordan Richard-Snodgrass, professional bowler on the PWBA Tour and 2023 PWBA Player of the Year. Was born in Tecumseh and was an all-state bowler for Tecumseh High School.
- Joseph C. Satterthwaite, diplomat with the Foreign Service, was born in Tecumseh. He served as Assistant Secretary of State for African Affairs, Director General of Foreign Service, and Diplomatic Agent/Consul General.
- Allan Seager, a writer and teacher of creative writing at University of Michigan, lived in Tecumseh from 1935 to his death in 1968. He published numerous short stories and novels, and a biography of poet Theodore Roethke.

== Don Juan ==
A horse, Don Juan, that belonged to General George Armstrong Custer is buried in Tecumseh. The horse had been sent to a friend living in Tecumseh after the General's death.

== Sister cities ==
- Tecumseh, Ontario, Canada
