= Tecumseh Township, Michigan =

- Civil township
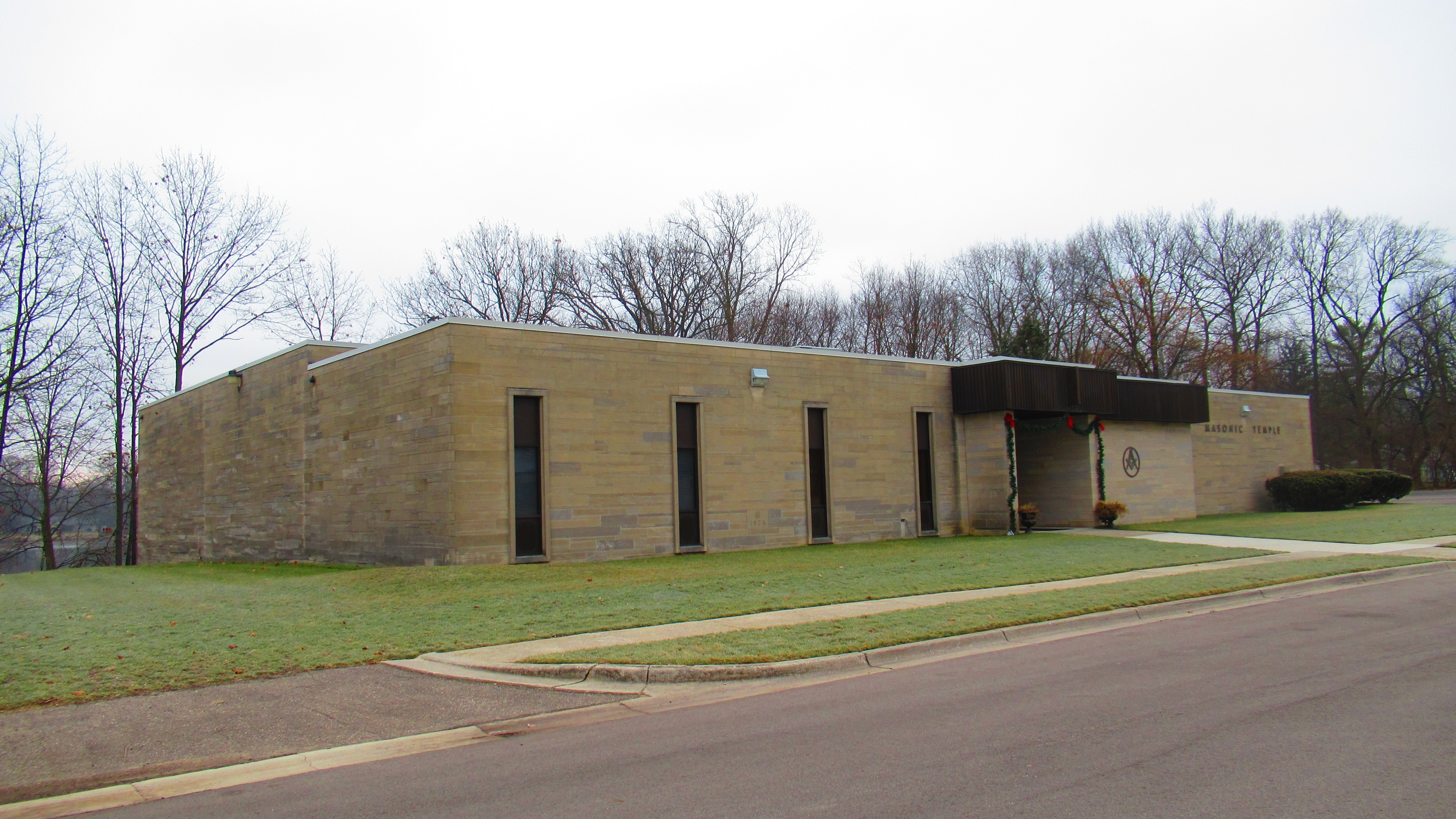
- Tecumseh Township Hall

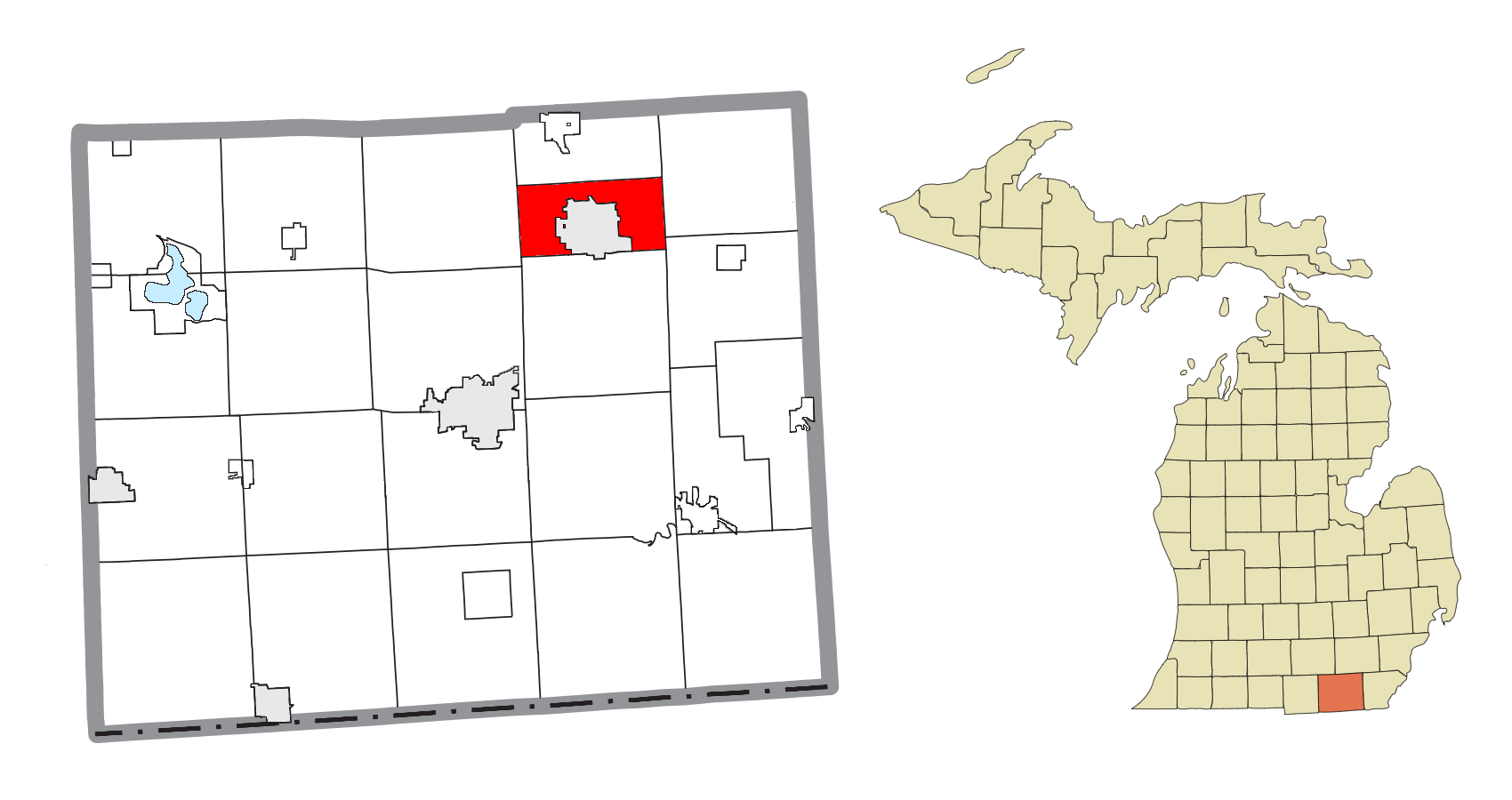
- Location within Lenawee County

- Location within the state of Michigan Tecumseh Township (the United States)
- Coordinates: 42°01′34″N 83°56′20″W
- Country: United States
- State: Michigan
- County: Lenawee
- Established: 1827

Government
  - Supervisor: Curtis Brown
  - Clerk: Rita A. Roth

Area
  - Total: 13.2 sq mi (34.2 km^{2})
  - Land: 13.1 sq mi (34.0 km^{2})
  - Water: 0.077 sq mi (0.2 km^{2})
- Elevation: 791 ft (241 m)

Population (2020)
  - Total: 2,042
  - Density: 156/sq mi (60.1/km^{2})
- Time zone: UTC-5 (Eastern (EST))
  - Summer (DST): UTC-4 (EDT)
- ZIP code(s): 49286 (Tecumseh)
- Area code: 517
- FIPS code: 26-79140
- GNIS feature ID: 1627156
- Website: www.tecumsehtownship.org

Tecumseh Township is a civil township of Lenawee County in the U.S. state of Michigan. The population was 2,042 at the 2020 census. The city of Tecumseh is surrounded by three sides by the Township. The township was first organized in 1827.

== Geography ==
According to the United States Census Bureau, the township has a total area of 13.2 square miles (34.2 km^{2}), of which 13.1 square miles (34.0 km^{2}) is land and 0.1 square mile (0.2 km^{2}) (0.53%) is water.

== Demographics ==
As of the census of 2000, there were 1,881 people, 672 households, and 583 families residing in the township. The population density was 143.3 inhabitants per square mile (55.3/km^{2}). There were 689 housing units at an average density of 52.5 per square mile (20.3/km^{2}). The racial makeup of the township was 97.55% White, 0.48% African American, 0.58% Native American, 0.58% Asian, 0.21% from other races, and 0.58% from two or more races. Hispanic or Latino of any race were 2.45% of the population.

There were 672 households, out of which 36.9% had children under the age of 18 living with them, 79.6% were married couples living together, 5.1% had a female householder with no husband present, and 13.2% were non-families. 9.7% of all households were made up of individuals, and 3.9% had someone living alone who was 65 years of age or older. The average household size was 2.80 and the average family size was 3.01.

In the township the population was spread out, with 25.7% under the age of 18, 5.6% from 18 to 24, 27.1% from 25 to 44, 30.8% from 45 to 64, and 10.7% who were 65 years of age or older. The median age was 41 years. For every 100 females, there were 99.9 males. For every 100 females age 18 and over, there were 102.2 males.

The median income for a household in the township was $69,276, and the median income for a family was $74,226. Males had a median income of $51,648 versus $31,071 for females. The per capita income for the township was $28,398. About 2.0% of families and 2.7% of the population were below the poverty line, including 2.7% of those under age 18 and 4.1% of those age 65 or over.
