= Morenci Area Schools =

School district in Michigan, United States

Address
- 788 East Coomer Street Morenci, Lenawee County, Michigan, 49256; United States

District information
- Grades: PreKindergarten–12
- Superintendent: Jennifer Ellis
- Schools: 2
- Budget: $9,874,000 2022–2023 expenditures
- NCES District ID: 2624570

Students and staff
- Students: 499 (2024–2025)
- Teachers: 32.3 (on an FTE basis) (2024–2025)
- Staff: 68.64 FTE (2024–2025)
- Student–teacher ratio: 15.45 (2024–2025)
- District mascot: Bulldogs

Other information
- Website: www.morencibulldogs.org

Morenci Area Schools is a public school district in Lenawee County, Michigan. It serves Morenci and parts of the townships of Dover, Fairfield, Hudson, Medina, and Seneca.

== History ==
The former Morenci High School was built in 1907 on Summit Street. It replaced an older school, built in 1872.

After the current high school was built, the additions built onto the 1907 school served as the district's middle school. The current high school opened on January 6, 1970, and was formally dedicated on February 1, 1970. The original 1907 section of the former high school was then torn down.

In 2002, voters passed a bond issue to fund the addition of a new middle school wing at the high school.

== Schools ==
Schools in Morenci Area Schools share a campus on the east side of Morenci.

Schools in Morenci Area Schools district
School	Address	Notes
Morenci Middle/High School	304 Page Street, Morenci	Grades 6–12
Morenci Elementary	517 East Locust Street, Morenci	Grades PreK-5
