= Canandaigua, Michigan =

- Unincorporated community
- Location within the state of Michigan Location within the United States
- Coordinates: 41°47′55″N 84°14′04″W
- Country: United States
- State: Michigan
- County: Lenawee
- Townships: Medina and Seneca
- Elevation: 1,047 ft (319 m)
- Time zone: UTC-5 (Eastern (EST))
  - Summer (DST): UTC-4 (EDT)
- ZIP code(s): 49235 (Clayton); 49256 (Morenci)
- Area code: 517
- GNIS feature ID: 622682

Canandaigua is an unincorporated community in Lenawee County in the U.S. state of Michigan. The community is located along M-156 within Medina Township to the west and Seneca Township to the east. As an unincorporated community, Canandaigua has no legally defined boundaries or population statistics of its own.

There was a Potawotamie village at this location. The first United States settlers arrived in the early 1830s. Canandaigua was an early milling village and important agricultural center between Clayton and Morenci. There was a post office here from April 1837 until July 1911. Until February 28, 1850, the post office was called Medina.

== Sources ==
- Walter Romig, Michigan Place Names, p. 96.
