= Lake Hudson State Recreation Area =

State park in Lenawee County, Michigan, United States

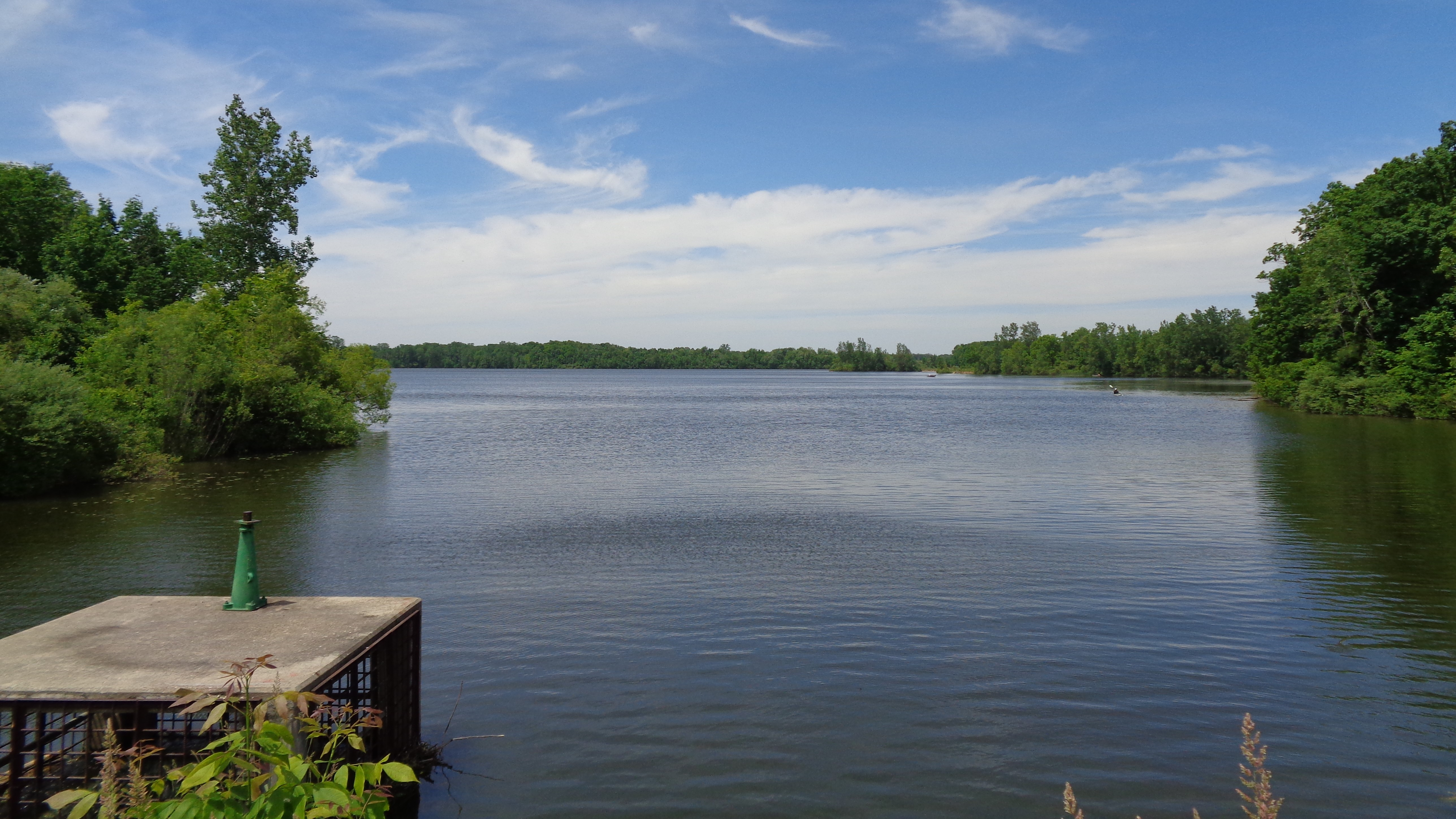
- View of Lake Hudson from the dam

- Location within Michigan Location within the United States
- Location: Hudson and Medina townships Lenawee County, Michigan
- Nearest city: Hudson, Michigan
- Coordinates: 41°50′10″N 84°14′30″W
- Area: 2,796 acres (1,132 ha)
- Established: 1979
- Governing body: Michigan Department of Natural Resources
- Website: Official website

Lake Hudson State Recreation Area is a public recreation area located within southwestern Lenawee County in the U.S. state of Michigan. With its main entrance located along M-156, it is mostly located within Hudson Township and a very small portion extending south into neighboring Medina Township.

The park was established in 1979, and it encompasses 2,796 acres (4.369 mi^{2}; 11.32 km^{2}) surrounding the Lake Hudson reservoir. Lake Hudson is recognized as the first dark-sky preserve in the United States, when it was designated as such in 1993. It is governed by the Michigan Department of Natural Resources and is operated and maintained by the nearby Hayes State Park in the northern portion of the county.

== Lake Hudson ==
The main geographic feature of the recreation area is Lake Hudson (sometimes referred to as Hudson Lake). The lake has a surface area of 502 acres (2.03 km^{2}) and a maximum depth of 24 feet (7.3 m). The lake was originally three separate smaller lakes called Bear Lake, Covell Lake, and Haley Lake. All three lakes were individual water bodies and connected by Bear Creek until the creation of a small earthen dam at the southern end of Bear Lake eventually flooded the area and connected the three lakes, which are combined today as Lake Hudson.

Lake Hudson contains a single public access boat ramp. Despite the lake's larger size, the entire lake is designated as a "no-wake" lake. While motorized vessels are permitted, it is unlawful to move at speeds creating a wake. The lake is a well known fishing destination, as it is frequently stocked by the Michigan Department of Natural Resources with walleye and muskellunge. The largest muskellunge caught in Lake Hudson is recorded in the state's Master Angler Entries at 47 inches (120 cm) long. Several similarly sized muskellunges are also listed. In addition to walleye and muskellunge, other fish species in the lake include black crappie, bluegill, channel catfish, largemouth bass, pumpkinseed, and yellow perch.

== Activities ==
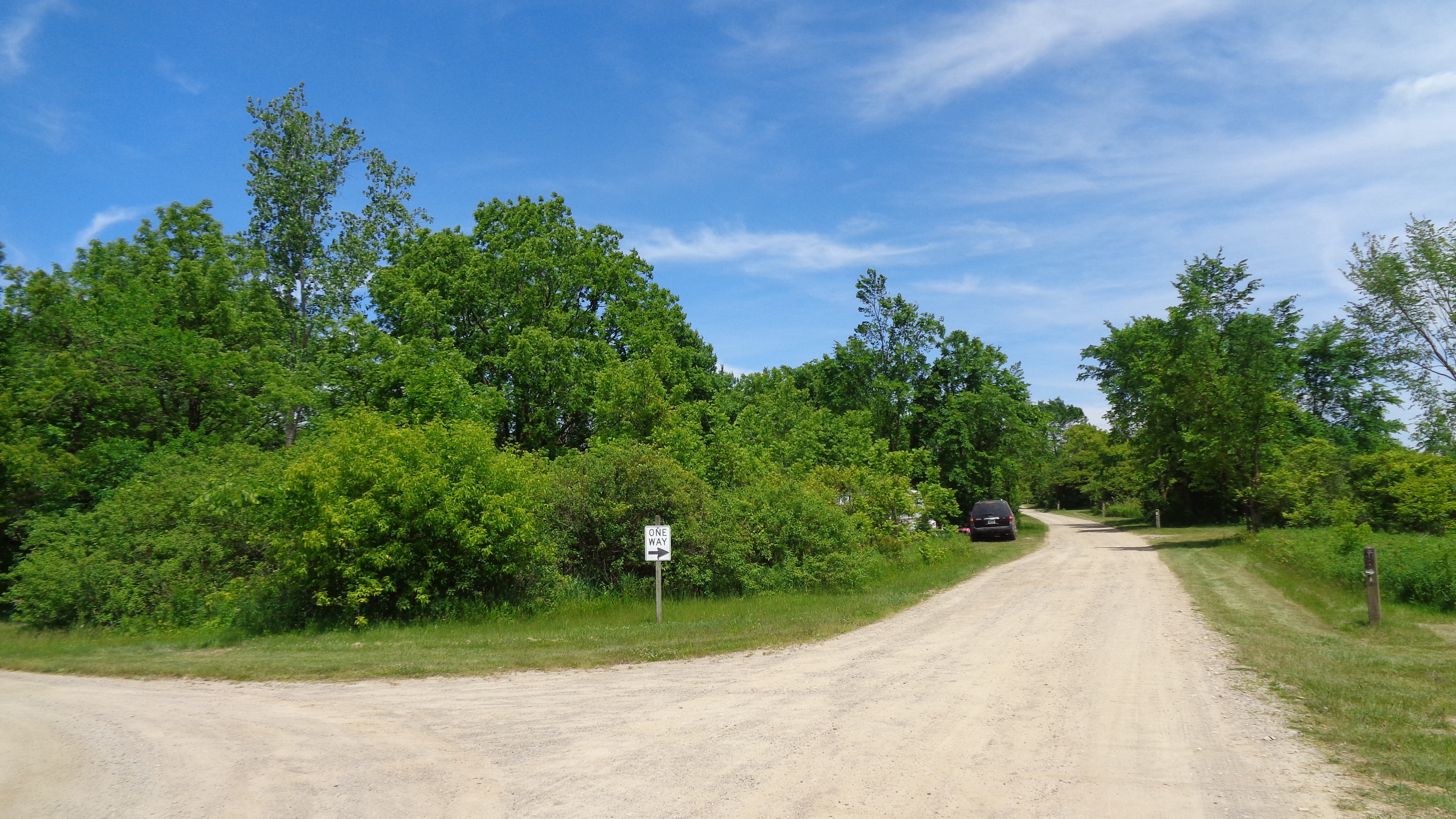
Lake Hudson Recreation Area campground

The Lake Hudson State Recreation Area includes a semi-modern campground consisting of 50 campsites. The campground features electrical hookups but no sewer connections or shower facilities, and a hand pump is the only source of potable water. There are vault toilets in the campground, boating access site, and the day-use beach area.

The forest area surrounding Lake Hudson is commonly used for seasonal game hunting, including waterfowl, turkey, and deer hunting. The forest contains numerous trails, but motorized vehicles are not permitted off the main roads. In addition to camping, fishing, and hunting, other activities within the recreation area include picnicking, metal detecting, swimming, bird watching, hiking, photography, and geocaching.

In 1993, Lake Hudson was designated as the first dark-sky preserve in the United States. It is currently one of seven such preserves in the state of Michigan, along with Negwegon State Park, Port Crescent State Park, Rockport State Recreation Area, Thompson's Harbor State Park, Wilderness State Park, and the internationally recognized Headlands Dark Sky Park. As required by the designation, the park must utilize measures to reduce light pollution, such as dimming headlights and outdoor lighting.

Sizable communities near Lake Hudson include the village of Clayton about 2.5 miles (4.0 km) north, the city of Hudson eight miles (13 km) northwest, and the city of Morenci nine miles (14 km) south. Nearby state parks within 30 miles (48 km) include Hayes State Park, Cambridge Junction Historic State Park, and Watkins Lake State Park and County Preserve, as well as Harrison Lake State Park south in Ohio.
