= Hudson Area Schools =

School district in Michigan, United States

Address
- 781 N. Maple Grove Avenue Hudson, Lenawee County, Michigan, 49247; United States

District information
- Grades: Pre-Kindergarten-12
- Superintendent: Dr. Michael Osborne
- Schools: 5
- Budget: $16,666,000 2022-2023 expenditures
- NCES District ID: 2618810

Students and staff
- Students: 1,369 (2024-2025)
- Teachers: 67.79 (on an FTE basis) (2024-2025)
- Staff: 165.41 FTE (2024-2025)
- Student–teacher ratio: 20.19 (2024-2025)

Other information
- Website: www.hudson.k12.mi.us

Hudson Area Schools is a public school district in Michigan. In Lenawee County, it serves Hudson, Clayton, and parts of the townships of Dover, Hudson, Medina, and Rollin. In Hillsdale County, it serves parts of the townships of Pittsford, Wheatland, and Wright.

== History ==
The first school in Hudson was established in 1836 in a log building. Central School, containing all grades, was built in 1860 and renovated and expanded in 1891. Central School was built on the west side of Hudson, in a separate district from Hudson's east side, which had its own school. The districts consolidated in 1866, only to separate again in 1869. Central School contained a high school and by 1875, the first class graduated. Hudson's districts consolidated again in 1891.

A new school, which housed the high school, opened in 1914. Governor Woodbridge N. Ferris spoke at the dedication on May 23, 1914. The class of 1914 gifted the school with a plaster copy of the sculpture Athena Giustiniani, which was placed near the stage of the auditorium.

The current high school opened in fall 1958.

In 1966, Hudson High School students began a project to build several single-family homes. Called Hudson Heritage, the project was a collaboration of several vocational classes, local businesses and the Future Homemakers Association. Members of the home construction class attended three academic classes in the morning, then built the home in the afternoon, learning construction skills on the job. By 1972, six houses had been completed on Lincoln and Wilcox Streets on a plot of land purchased by the school district in 1953 for a school site that never materialized. Other school districts in the area, as well as the Lenawee County Vo-Tech Center, also participated. The goal was to build ten houses and sell them at a reasonable cost.

The 1974 high school yearbook offers a snapshot of the district at that time: "There are two elementary schools, one middle school and one high school for the 1570 young people in the Hudson area. University of Michigan accreditation was acquired in 1893 and North Central Association accreditation in 1914."

In 1975, the high school football team won its 72nd consecutive game, setting a national record at the time.

== Southern Michigan Center for Science and Industry ==
The Southern Michigan CSI provides technical and vocational training to Hudson students in grades seven through twelve, and also offers adult training courses in skills such as operating robotics, computer numerical control machines, and forklifts. An on-site medical clinic is open to the public. The community also has access to the facility's fitness center with a paid membership. The center was established in 2014 through a partnership with the school district and city of Hudson. Grants, a county-wide education millage, and corporate donations also contribute to the funding.

== Schools ==
Schools in Hudson Area Schools district
School	Address	Notes
Hudson Middle School and Junior/Senior High School	771 N. Maple Grove Avenue, Hudson	Grades 5–12; built 1958
Lincoln Elementary	746 N. Maple Grove Avenue, Hudson	Grades PreK-4
Hudson Tech Alternative High School	550 E. Main Street, Hudson	Alternative high school housed at Southern Michigan Center for Science and Industry
Hudson Virtual Elementary	550 E. Main Street, Hudson	Online school with an in-person academic assistance at the Southern Michigan Center for Science and Industry
Southern Michigan Center for Science and Industry	550 E. Main Street, Hudson	Vocational/technical education
