= M156 (disambiguation) =

M156 usually refers to the Mercedes-Benz M156 engine.

M156 may also refer to:

- M-156 (Michigan highway)
- Maserati M156 platform
- M156 universal mount, used with U.S. helicopter armament subsystems
- M156 (Cape Town), a Metropolitan Route in Cape Town, South Africa
- German minesweeper M156, sunk in 1944 after an action by HMS Talybont
