= Medina Township, Michigan =

- Civil township
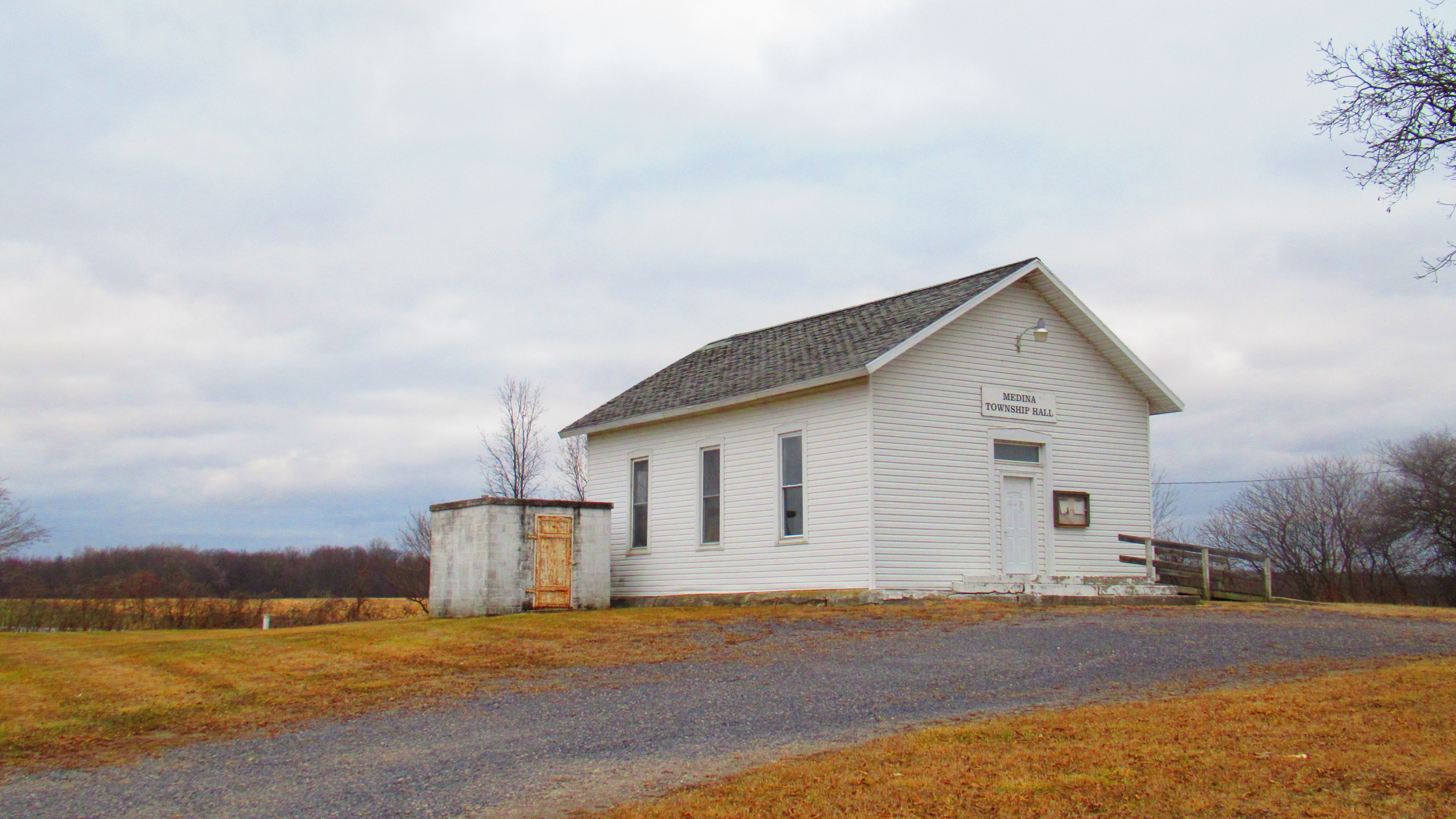
- Medina Township Hall

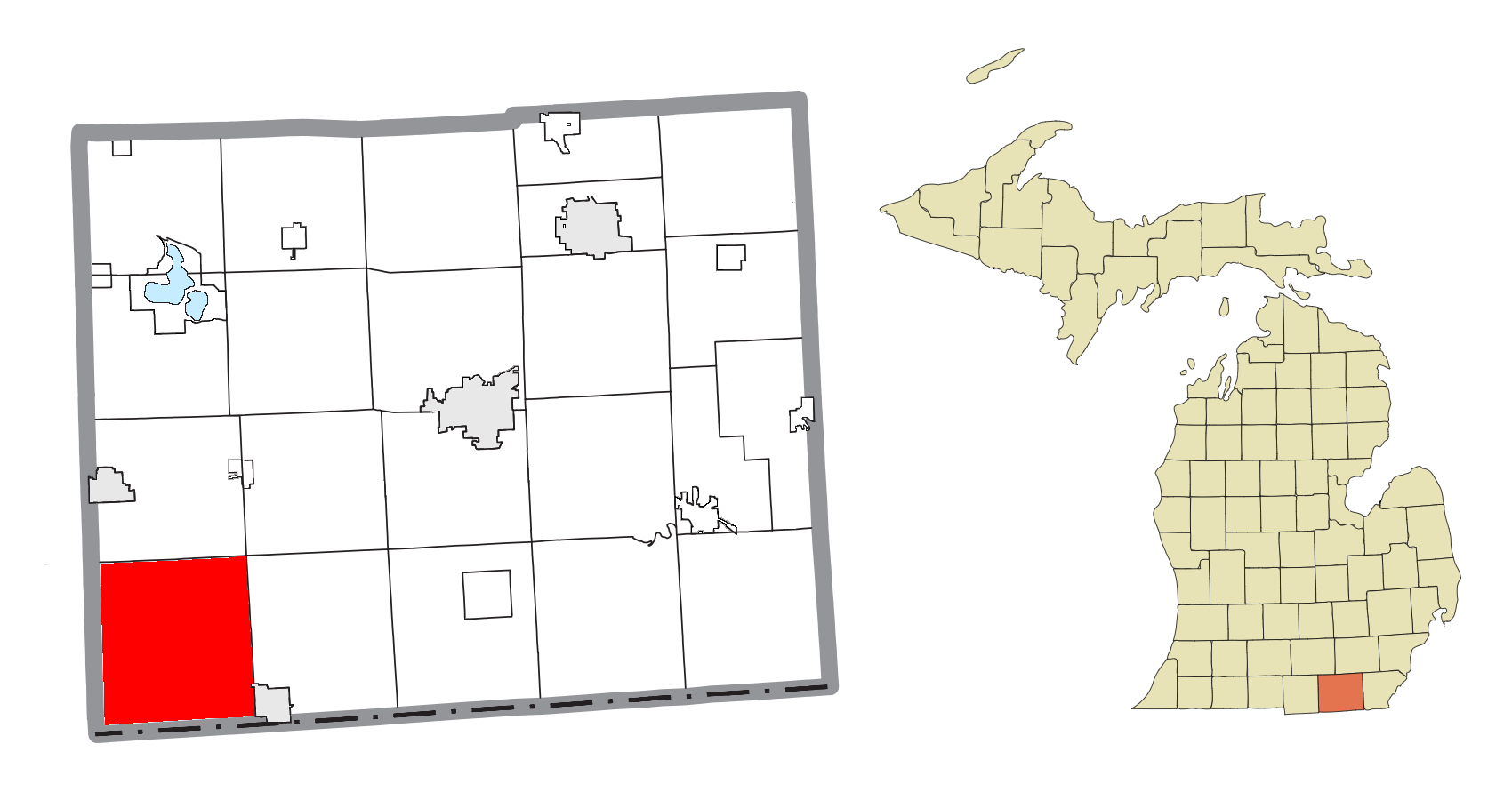
- Location within Lenawee County

- Location within the state of Michigan Location within the United States
- Coordinates: 41°45′26″N 84°17′25″W
- Country: United States
- State: Michigan
- County: Lenawee
- Established: 1836

Government
  - Supervisor: Jason Root
  - Clerk: Sylvia Monserrate-Damon

Area
  - Total: 47.63 sq mi (123.36 km^{2})
  - Land: 47.54 sq mi (123.13 km^{2})
  - Water: 0.089 sq mi (0.23 km^{2})
- Elevation: 797 ft (243 m)

Population (2020)
  - Total: 1,115
  - Density: 23.45/sq mi (9.055/km^{2})
- Time zone: UTC-5 (Eastern (EST))
  - Summer (DST): UTC-4 (EDT)
- ZIP code(s): 49247 (Hudson); 49256 (Morenci); 49288 (Waldron)
- Area code: 517
- FIPS code: 26-52820
- GNIS feature ID: 1626717
- Website: medinatownshipmi.gov

Medina Township is a civil township of Lenawee County in the U.S. state of Michigan. The population was 1,115 at the 2020 census.

== Communities ==
- Canandaigua is an unincorporated community in the eastern portion of the township along M-152 at 41°47′55″N 84°14′04″W. Originally an Indian village, it was first settled in 1824 by New York native Samuel Gregg, and the community was named after Canandaigua, New York. It was platted in 1835 and given a post office from 1837 until 1911.
- Medina is an unincorporated community in the northeastern corner of the township at 41°48′29″N 84°15′50″W. The first settler was Daniel Upton, who moved from Peterborough, New Hampshire in 1812. The village was platted in 1837. A post office was first established September 20, 1837 and later moved to Canandaigua in 1850. Another post office was reestablished in Medina soon after in 1851 but later disestablished. The community was named after the township itself, which may have been named by early settlers from Medina, New York.
- Ontario is a former community along a railway station. Ontario contained its own post office from June 28, 1881 until January 31, 1902.

== Geography ==
According to the U.S. Census Bureau, the township has a total area of 47.63 square miles (123.36 km^{2}), of which 47.54 square miles (123.13 km^{2}) is land and 0.09 square miles (0.23 km^{2}) (0.19%) is water.

Lake Hudson State Recreation Area occupies a very small northeastern portion of the township. Bordering the state of Ohio to the south, Medina Township is the southwesternmost municipality included in the Detroit–Warren–Ann Arbor Combined Statistical Area (Metro Detroit), as it is located about 85 miles (137 km) southwest of the city of Detroit.

=== Major highways ===
- US 127 forms the entire western boundary of the township.
- M-156 (Morey Highway) forms a small portion of the eastern boundary of the township.

== Demographics ==
As of the census of 2000, there were 1,227 people, 451 households, and 357 families residing in the township. The population density was 25.8 inhabitants per square mile (10.0/km^{2}). There were 484 housing units at an average density of 10.2 per square mile (3.9/km^{2}). The racial makeup of the township was 98.04% White, 0.49% African American, 0.08% Native American, 0.16% Asian, 0.33% from other races, and 0.90% from two or more races. Hispanic or Latino of any race were 1.71% of the population.

There were 451 households, out of which 31.9% had children under the age of 18 living with them, 66.7% were married couples living together, 6.7% had a female householder with no husband present, and 20.8% were non-families. 18.2% of all households were made up of individuals, and 9.1% had someone living alone who was 65 years of age or older. The average household size was 2.69 and the average family size was 3.04.

In the township the population was spread out, with 25.3% under the age of 18, 8.4% from 18 to 24, 25.1% from 25 to 44, 26.8% from 45 to 64, and 14.3% who were 65 years of age or older. The median age was 40 years. For every 100 females, there were 116.0 males. For every 100 females age 18 and over, there were 108.7 males.

The median income for a household in the township was $40,347, and the median income for a family was $44,519. Males had a median income of $31,493 versus $23,889 for females. The per capita income for the township was $18,008. About 4.8% of families and 6.2% of the population were below the poverty line, including 4.2% of those under age 18 and 9.7% of those age 65 or over.

== Education ==
Medina Township is served by three separate public school districts. The majority of the township is served by Morenci Area Schools. A small northwestern portion is served by Hudson Area Schools, and a smaller southwestern portion is served by Waldron Area Schools in Hillsdale County.
