= Hudson High School (Michigan) =

Location
- 771 N. Maple Grove Ave. Hudson, Lenawee, Michigan 49247; United States
- Coordinates: 41.8648°N 84.3464°W

Information
- Type: Public, Coeducational high school
- School district: Hudson Area Schools
- Staff: 22.94 (FTE)
- Grades: 9-12
- Student to teacher ratio: 20.62
- Colors: orange and black
- Athletics conference: Lenawee County Athletic Association
- Mascot: Tiger
- Team name: Tigers
- Website: www.hudson.k12.mi.us

Hudson High School is a public high school in Hudson, Michigan. It is the only high school in the Hudson Area Schools district. Their nickname is the Tigers.
