= Seneca Township, Michigan =

- Civil township
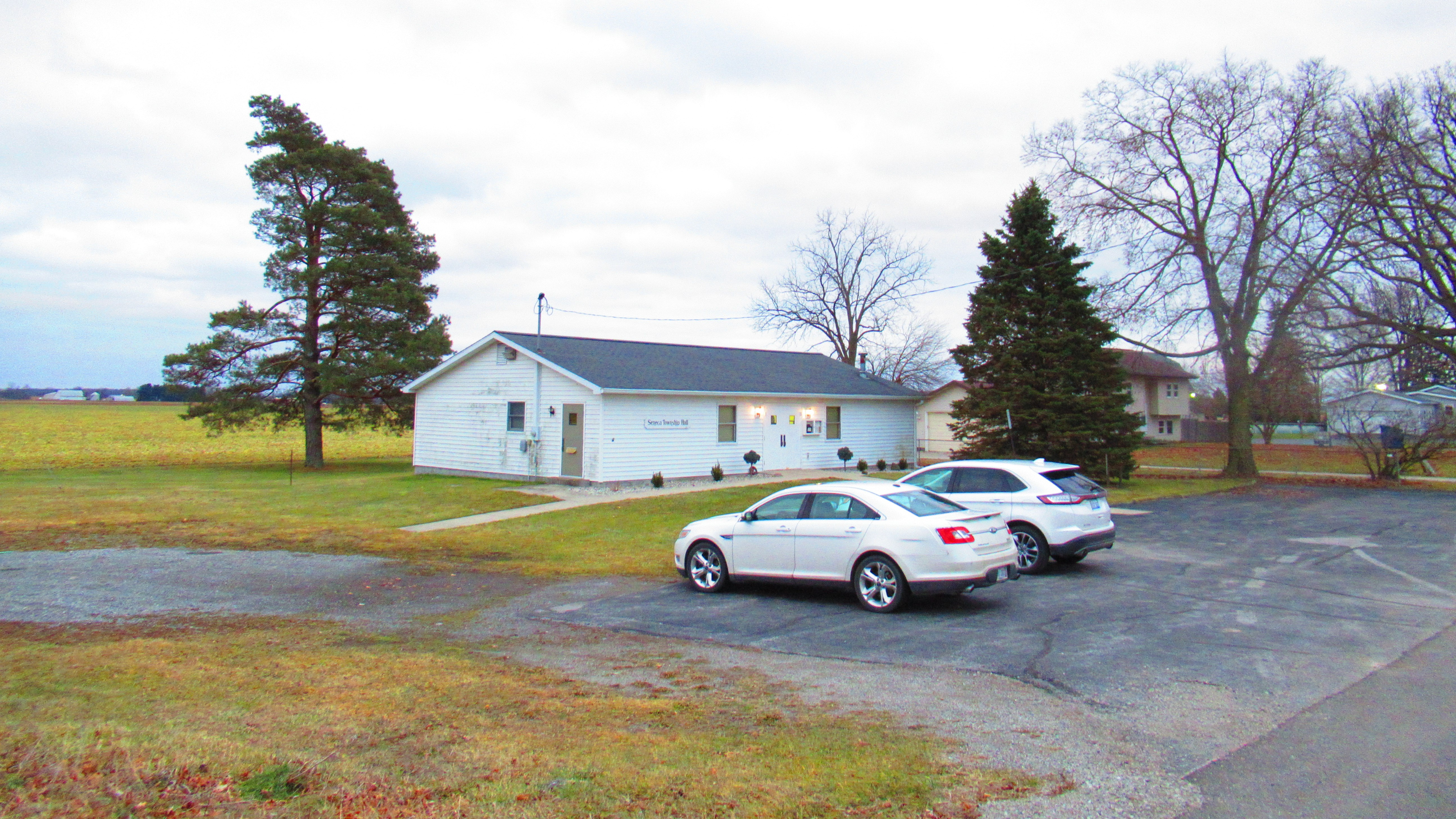
- Seneca Township Hall

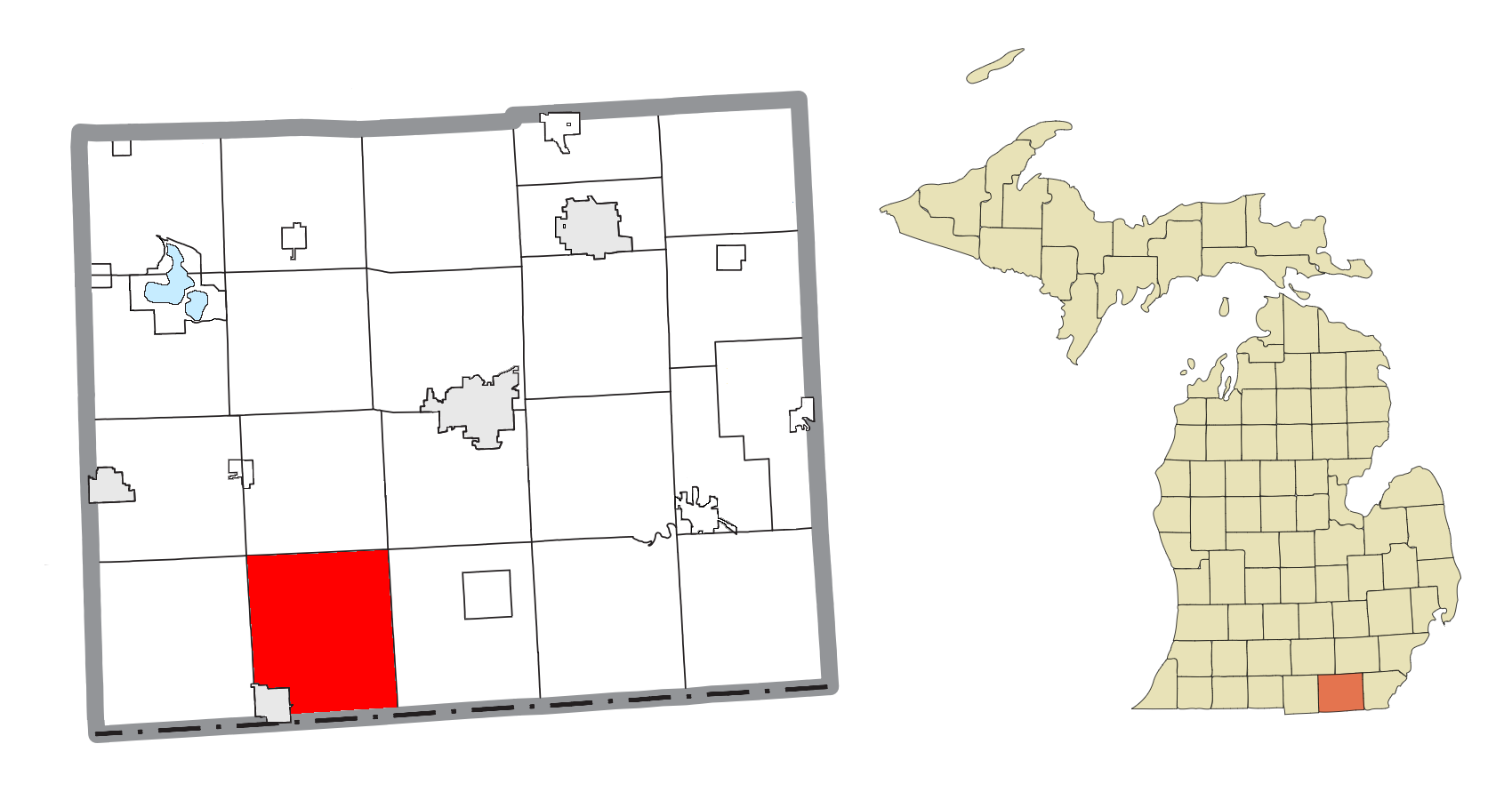
- Location within Lenawee County

- Location within the state of Michigan Seneca Township (the United States)
- Coordinates: 41°45′42″N 84°10′05″W
- Country: United States
- State: Michigan
- County: Lenawee

Government
  - Supervisor: John Gould
  - Clerk: Allison Ott

Area
  - Total: 40.1 sq mi (103.8 km^{2})
  - Land: 40.0 sq mi (103.6 km^{2})
  - Water: 0.077 sq mi (0.2 km^{2})
- Elevation: 791 ft (241 m)

Population (2020)
  - Total: 1,155
  - Density: 28.87/sq mi (11.15/km^{2})
- Time zone: UTC-5 (Eastern (EST))
  - Summer (DST): UTC-4 (EDT)
- ZIP code(s): 49235 (Clayton); 49256 (Morenci); 49279 (Sand Creek)
- Area code: 517
- FIPS code: 26-72440
- GNIS feature ID: 1627058
- Website: townshipofseneca.com

Seneca Township is a civil township of Lenawee County in the U.S. state of Michigan. The population was 1,155 at the 2020 census.

== Geography ==
According to the United States Census Bureau, the township has a total area of 40.1 square miles (104 km^{2}), of which 40.0 square miles (104 km^{2}) is land and 0.1 square miles (0.26 km^{2}) (0.15%) is water.

== Demographics ==
As of the census of 2000, there were 1,303 people, 469 households, and 363 families residing in the township. The population density was 32.6 inhabitants per square mile (12.6/km^{2}). There were 489 housing units at an average density of 12.2 per square mile (4.7/km^{2}). The racial makeup of the township was 95.78% White, 0.23% African American, 1.00% Native American, 0.08% Asian, 2.38% from other races, and 0.54% from two or more races. Hispanic or Latino of any race were 4.60% of the population.

There were 469 households, out of which 36.5% had children under the age of 18 living with them, 65.0% were married couples living together, 6.6% had a female householder with no husband present, and 22.4% were non-families. 18.3% of all households were made up of individuals, and 9.2% had someone living alone who was 65 years of age or older. The average household size was 2.78 and the average family size was 3.15.

In the township the population was spread out, with 27.1% under the age of 18, 8.2% from 18 to 24, 28.3% from 25 to 44, 25.5% from 45 to 64, and 10.9% who were 65 years of age or older. The median age was 37 years. For every 100 females, there were 105.2 males. For every 100 females age 18 and over, there were 100.8 males.

The median income for a household in the township was $44,107, and the median income for a family was $47,596. Males had a median income of $36,719 versus $21,848 for females. The per capita income for the township was $17,758. About 2.9% of families and 5.7% of the population were below the poverty line, including 3.8% of those under age 18 and 3.2% of those age 65 or over.
