= Lenawee County, Michigan =

County in Michigan, United States

- County
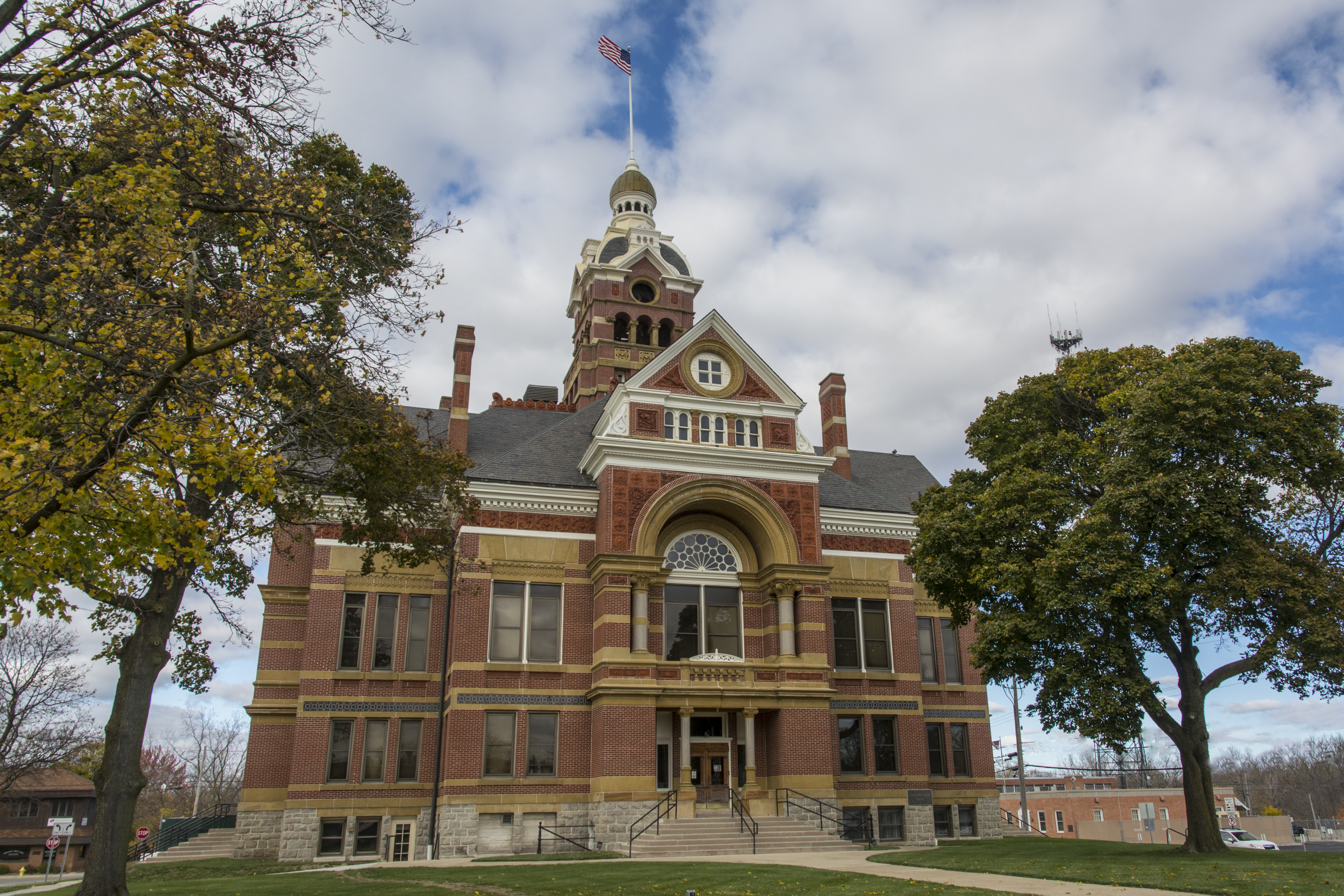
- Lenawee County Courthouse in Adrian

- Location within the U.S. state of Michigan
- Coordinates: 41°53′N 84°04′W
- Country: United States
- State: Michigan
- Created: 1822
- Organized: September 10, 1826
- Seat: Adrian
- Largest city: Adrian

Area
  - Total: 761 sq mi (1,970 km^{2})
  - Land: 750 sq mi (1,900 km^{2})
  - Water: 12 sq mi (31 km^{2}) 1.6%

Population (2020)
  - Total: 99,423
  - Estimate (2025): 97,779 ▼
  - Density: 130/sq mi (50/km^{2})
- Time zone: UTC−5 (Eastern)
  - Summer (DST): UTC−4 (EDT)
- Congressional district: 5th
- Website: www.lenawee.mi.us

Lenawee County (/ˈlɛnəweɪ/ LEN-ə-way) is a county located in the U.S. state of Michigan. As of the 2020 United States census, the population was 99,423. The county seat is Adrian. The county was created in 1822, from territory partitioned from Monroe County. Its governing structure was organized in 1826.

Lenawee County comprises the Adrian, Michigan, micropolitan statistical area. It is served by the Toledo Media market. Lenawee County is home to the Potawatomi, Ottawa, Chippewa, Iroquois, Miami, Sauk, Fox, Mascoutens, and Huron tribes.

== History ==
The county owes its formation to the 1807 Treaty of Detroit, by which the Ottawa, Ojibwe (called Chippewa by the Americans); Wyandot and Potawatomi nations ceded their claims to the United States of their traditional territories in today's southeast Michigan. However, many leaders of these tribes believed that the treaty was coercive and opposed it. They began to collaborate and organize a confederacy of resistance, led by Chief Tecumseh (Shawnee). They wanted through warfare and alliance with Great Britain to force the US from their territory. This was the period of the US War of 1812 with Great Britain. During this time, the US fought the Battle of Tippecanoe, the Battle of Lake Erie, and the Battle of Thames in this area, against both British and indigenous forces.

The United States won the Battle of the Thames in 1813, defeating the British and their allies. Tecumseh died in the battle and his confederacy dissolved. (He became the namesake for the city of the same name in Lenawee County.) As a result of this defeat, the confederacy leaders agreed to a peace treaty, the Treaty of Ghent, which ended the war with the indigenous peoples. It affirmed US control of the land demarcated in the Treaty of Detroit, comprising much of the future state of Michigan, including what became organized as Lenawee County in the United States.

The US continued efforts to force the tribes from these western territories. In 1830, President Andrew Jackson signed the Indian Removal Act to authorize the government to relocate Indigenous peoples from territories east of the Mississippi River and move them west, to what became known as Indian Territory (and later Oklahoma). While Indian Removal was directed specifically at Southeast Indian tribes, it was also applied to those further north in the Midwest.

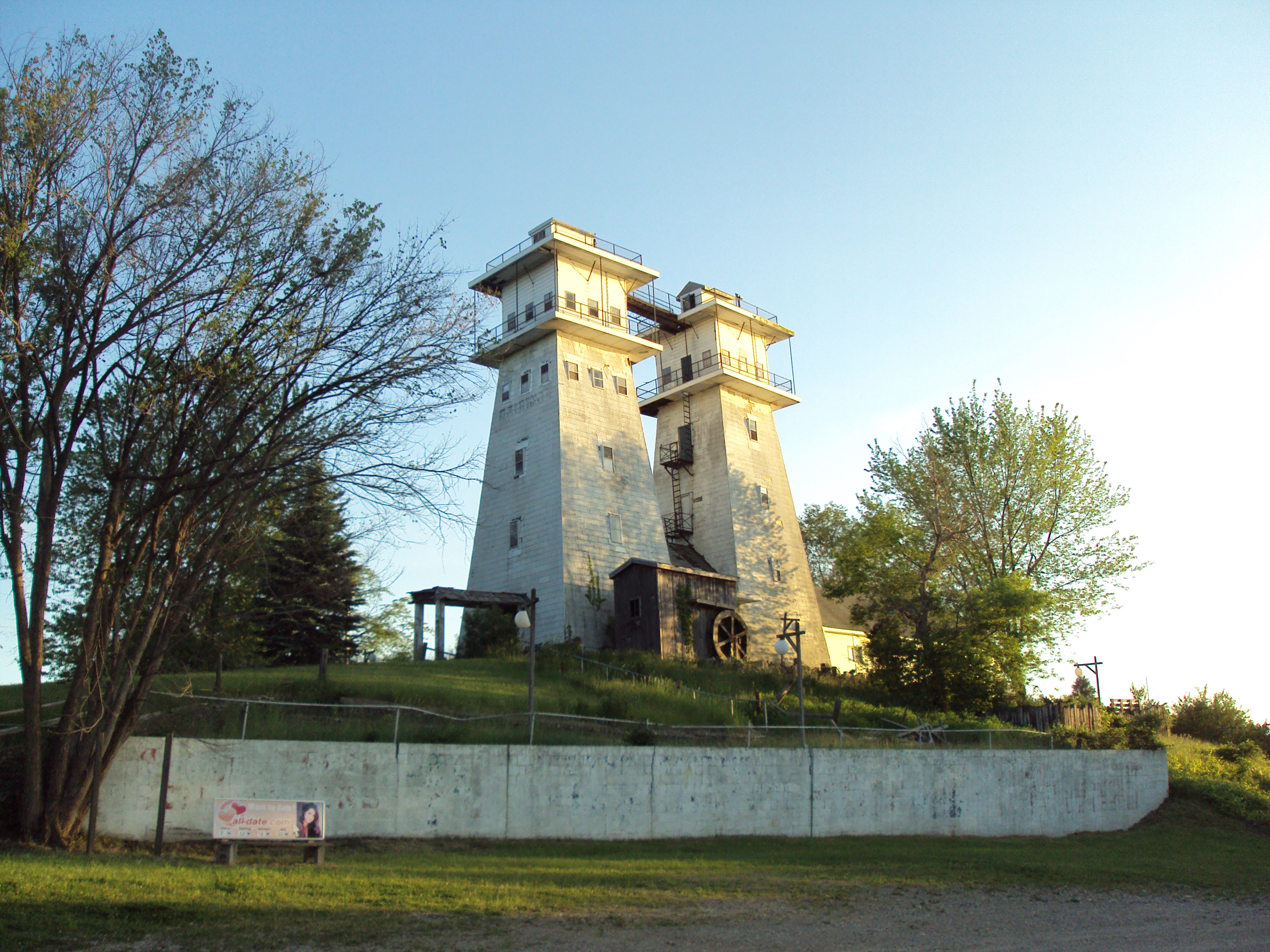
Towers of the Irish Hills near Hayes State Park

Lenawee County was organized in 1826, after being authorized and described by the Michigan legislature in 1822. It was taken from Monroe County, Michigan.

== Etymology ==
The county's name was a neologism created by Henry Rowe Schoolcraft, a US Indian agent in the region who later became a prominent ethnologist. Married to Jane Johnston, a mixed-race woman of high-rank Ojibwe and Scots ancestry, Schoolcraft gained entry to Ojibwe language and culture through her. He later became a proponent of forced Indigenous assimilation. While working in Michigan, he named several of the newly organized counties in the area, all neologisms. 'Lenawee' is thought to be derived from a misappropriation of an Indigenous word. Scholars debate whether its origins lie in the Lenape language leno or lenno, meaning "male," or the Shawnee lenawai.

== Geography ==
According to the US Census Bureau, the county has a total area of 761 square miles (1,970 km^{2}), of which 750 square miles (1,900 km^{2}) is land and 12 square miles (31 km^{2}) (1.6%) is water. Lenawee County is considered to be part of Southeastern Michigan.

=== Adjacent counties ===
- Jackson County, northwest
- Washtenaw County, northeast
- Monroe County, east
- Lucas County, Ohio, southeast
- Fulton County, Ohio, southwest
- Hillsdale County, west

=== Major highways ===
- US 12
- US 127
- US 223
- M-34
- M-50
- M-52
- M-124
- M-156

Within Lenawee County's townships, north–south roads are referred to as "highways", while east–west roads are referred to as "roads".

== Demographics ==
Historical population
Census	Pop.	Note	%±
1830	1,491		—
1840	17,889		1,099.8%
1850	26,372		47.4%
1860	38,112		44.5%
1870	45,595		19.6%
1880	48,343		6.0%
1890	48,448		0.2%
1900	48,406		−0.1%
1910	47,907		−1.0%
1920	47,767		−0.3%
1930	49,849		4.4%
1940	53,110		6.5%
1950	64,629		21.7%
1960	77,789		20.4%
1970	81,609		4.9%
1980	89,948		10.2%
1990	91,476		1.7%
2000	98,890		8.1%
2010	99,892		1.0%
2020	99,423		−0.5%
2025 (est.)	97,779	▼	−1.7%
US Decennial Census; 1790-1960 1900-1990; 1990-2000 2010-2018

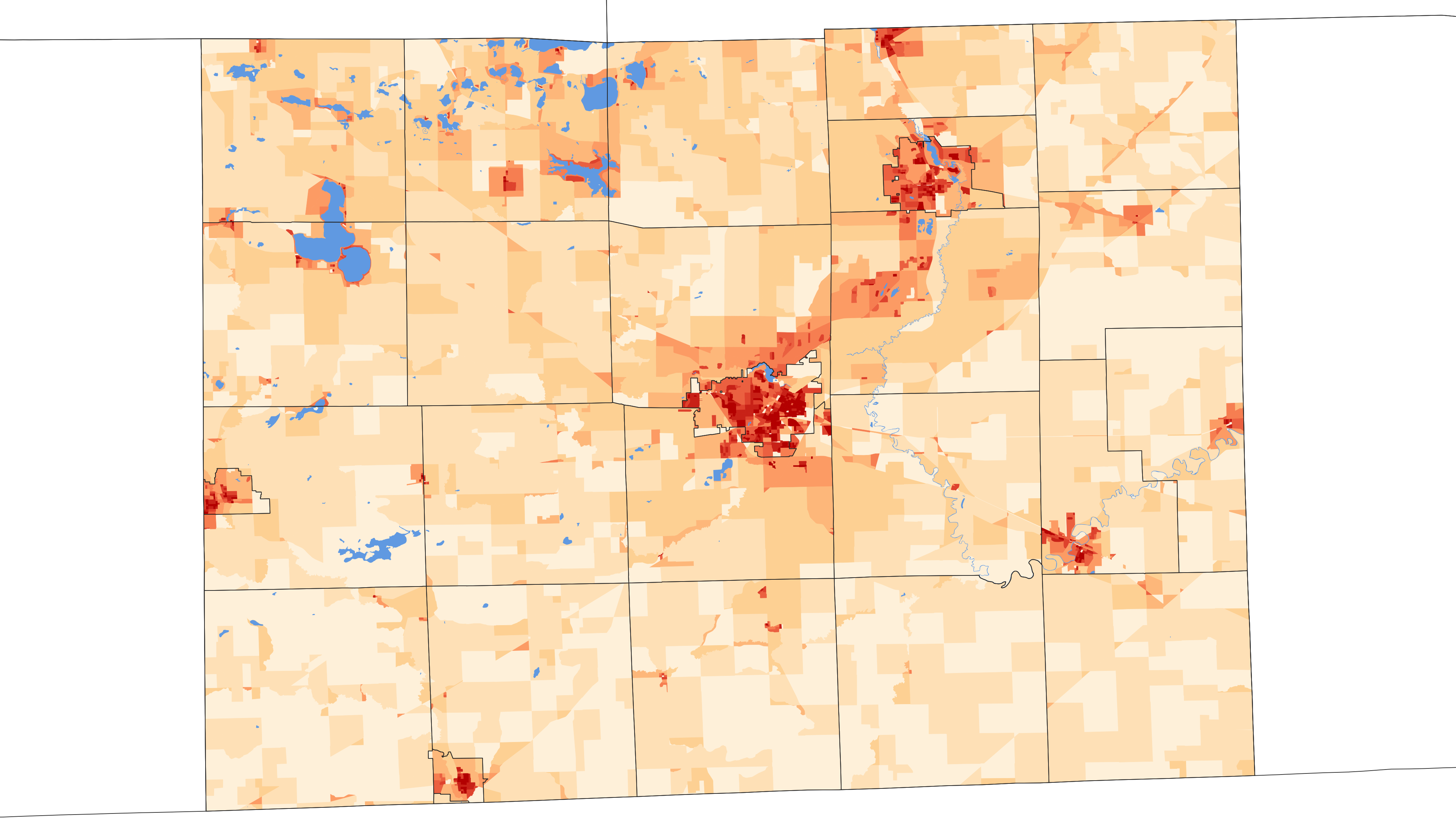
2020 population density of Lenawee County MI by census block

=== Racial and ethnic composition ===
Lenawee County, Michigan – Racial and ethnic composition Note: the US Census treats Hispanic/Latino as an ethnic category. This table excludes Latinos from the racial categories and assigns them to a separate category. Hispanics/Latinos may be of any race.
Race / Ethnicity (NH = Non-Hispanic)	Pop 1980	Pop 1990	Pop 2000	Pop 2010	Pop 2020	% 1980	% 1990	% 2000	% 2010	% 2020
White alone (NH)	84,092	83,805	88,188	87,483	83,126	93.49%	91.61%	89.18%	87.58%	83.61%
Black or African American alone (NH)	722	1,367	2,033	2,397	2,437	0.80%	1.49%	2.06%	2.40%	2.45%
Native American or Alaska Native alone (NH)	171	246	322	379	342	0.19%	0.27%	0.33%	0.38%	0.34%
Asian alone (NH)	293	464	439	492	476	0.33%	0.51%	0.44%	0.49%	0.48%
Native Hawaiian or Pacific Islander alone (NH)	x	x	6	21	8	x	x	0.01%	0.02%	0.01%
Other race alone (NH)	97	79	80	47	299	0.11%	0.09%	0.08%	0.05%	0.30%
Mixed race or Multiracial (NH)	x	x	938	1,459	4,241	x	x	0.95%	1.46%	4.27%
Hispanic or Latino (any race)	4,573	5,515	6,884	7,614	8,494	5.08%	6.03%	6.96%	7.62%	8.54%
Total	89,948	91,476	98,890	99,892	99,423	100.00%	100.00%	100.00%	100.00%	100.00%

=== 2020 census ===
As of the 2020 census, the county had a population of 99,423. The median age was 42.3 years. 21.0% of residents were under the age of 18 and 20.0% of residents were 65 years of age or older. For every 100 females there were 101.7 males, and for every 100 females age 18 and over there were 100.7 males age 18 and over.

The racial makeup of the county was 87.1% White, 2.6% Black or African American, 0.5% American Indian and Alaska Native, 0.5% Asian, <0.1% Native Hawaiian and Pacific Islander, 2.2% from some other race, and 7.1% from two or more races. Hispanic or Latino residents of any race comprised 8.5% of the population.

43.1% of residents lived in urban areas, while 56.9% lived in rural areas.

There were 38,581 households in the county, of which 28.0% had children under the age of 18 living in them. Of all households, 50.3% were married-couple households, 17.9% were households with a male householder and no spouse or partner present, and 24.2% were households with a female householder and no spouse or partner present. About 27.5% of all households were made up of individuals and 12.8% had someone living alone who was 65 years of age or older.

There were 43,577 housing units, of which 11.5% were vacant. Among occupied housing units, 77.3% were owner-occupied and 22.7% were renter-occupied. The homeowner vacancy rate was 1.4% and the rental vacancy rate was 7.1%.

=== 2000 census ===
As of the 2000 United States census, there were 98,890 people, 35,930 households, and 26,049 families in the county. The population density was 132 people per square mile (51 people/km^{2}). There were 39,769 housing units at an average density of 53 per square mile (20/km^{2}). The racial makeup of the county was 92.51% White, 2.12% Black or African American, 0.41% Native American, 0.46% Asian, 0.01% Pacific Islander, 3.01% from other races, and 1.49% from two or more races. 6.96% of the population were Hispanic or Latino. Residents identified as being 30.4% of German, 11.6% English, 10.2% American and 9.9% Irish ancestry. Some 94.7% spoke English and 4.2% Spanish as their first language.

There were 35,930 households, out of which 34.20% had children under the age of 18 living with them, 58.70% were married couples living together, 10.00% had a female householder with no husband present, and 27.50% were non-families. 22.90% of all households were made up of individuals, and 9.70% had someone living alone who was 65 years of age or older. The average household size was 2.61 and the average family size was 3.07.

The county population contained 25.90% under the age of 18, 9.10% from 18 to 24, 28.60% from 25 to 44, 23.70% from 45 to 64, and 12.70% who were 65 years of age or older. The median age was 36 years. For every 100 females there were 100.10 males. For every 100 females age 18 and over, there were 98.00 males.

The median income for a household in the county was $45,739, and the median income for a family was $53,661. Males had a median income of $38,458 versus $25,510 for females. The per capita income for the county was $20,186. About 4.40% of families and 6.70% of the population were below the poverty line, including 7.10% of those under age 18 and 9.20% of those age 65 or over.

== Government and politics ==
Lenawee County has been reliably Republican in national elections. Since 1884, its voters have selected the Republican Party nominee in 31 of 36 presidential elections.

United States presidential election results for Lenawee County, Michigan
Year	Republican		Democratic		Third party(ies)	
Year	No.	%	No.	%	No.	%
1884	5,827	46.63%	5,572	44.59%	1,098	8.79%
1888	6,475	49.49%	5,671	43.35%	937	7.16%
1892	5,833	46.86%	5,592	44.92%	1,024	8.23%
1896	6,863	50.89%	6,300	46.72%	323	2.40%
1900	6,847	51.75%	5,966	45.09%	419	3.17%
1904	7,891	67.40%	3,334	28.48%	482	4.12%
1908	6,607	56.22%	4,704	40.03%	441	3.75%
1912	2,996	27.02%	4,239	38.23%	3,854	34.76%
1916	6,247	52.01%	5,519	45.95%	246	2.05%
1920	11,973	68.89%	5,095	29.32%	311	1.79%
1924	13,358	72.65%	3,950	21.48%	1,080	5.87%
1928	14,794	76.94%	4,321	22.47%	112	0.58%
1932	10,912	50.50%	10,420	48.23%	275	1.27%
1936	12,154	56.70%	8,299	38.72%	982	4.58%
1940	16,963	70.19%	7,132	29.51%	71	0.29%
1944	16,382	70.48%	6,750	29.04%	111	0.48%
1948	14,369	67.49%	6,529	30.67%	393	1.85%
1952	20,035	72.72%	7,397	26.85%	117	0.42%
1956	21,100	72.68%	7,857	27.06%	74	0.25%
1960	19,859	64.65%	10,785	35.11%	75	0.24%
1964	11,385	40.29%	16,815	59.50%	60	0.21%
1968	16,280	55.85%	10,552	36.20%	2,315	7.94%
1972	19,125	62.39%	11,018	35.94%	511	1.67%
1976	18,397	55.02%	14,610	43.70%	428	1.28%
1980	20,366	56.44%	12,935	35.85%	2,784	7.72%
1984	22,409	66.70%	11,012	32.78%	176	0.52%
1988	19,115	57.84%	13,690	41.42%	243	0.74%
1992	14,297	36.32%	15,399	39.12%	9,669	24.56%
1996	14,168	39.78%	16,924	47.51%	4,527	12.71%
2000	20,681	51.58%	18,365	45.81%	1,047	2.61%
2004	25,675	54.61%	20,787	44.22%	550	1.17%
2008	22,225	46.43%	24,640	51.48%	1,000	2.09%
2012	22,351	49.75%	21,776	48.47%	801	1.78%
2016	26,430	57.09%	16,750	36.18%	3,118	6.73%
2020	31,541	59.01%	20,918	39.13%	993	1.86%
2024	33,463	60.82%	20,787	37.78%	766	1.39%

United States Senate election results for Lenawee County, Michigan1
Year	Republican		Democratic		Third party(ies)	
Year	No.	%	No.	%	No.	%
2024	32,385	60.21%	19,772	36.76%	1,627	3.03%

Michigan Gubernatorial election results for Lenawee County
Year	Republican		Democratic		Third party(ies)	
Year	No.	%	No.	%	No.	%
2022	23,796	55.52%	18,248	42.58%	813	1.90%

The county government operates the jail, maintains rural roads, operates the major local courts, records deeds, mortgages, and vital records, administers public health regulations, and participates with the state in the provision of social services. The county board of commissioners controls the budget and has limited authority to make laws or ordinances. In Michigan, most local government functions—police and fire, building and zoning, tax assessment, street maintenance, etc.—are the responsibility of individual cities and townships.

Adrian College and Siena Heights University are located within the county.

Voters in Lenawee County have supported candidates from both political parties in statewide elections, making it a swing county. Tecumseh and Adrian have tended to lean Democrat, while Dover, Madison, and Riga townships have tended to lean Republican.

Lenawee County is located in Michigan's 5th congressional district, which is represented by Tim Walberg, a resident of the county. Walberg previously served as Lenawee's state representative. The district includes all of Lenawee, Jackson, Hillsdale, Branch, and Eaton counties, as well as parts of Calhoun and Washtenaw counties. He defeated incumbent Democrat Mark Schauer. Schauer had defeated Walberg in the 2008 congressional election, after Walberg's first stint in Congress.

Most of Lenawee County is represented in the Michigan House of Representatives by Republican Nancy Jenkins-Arno who represents the 34th District, she also served as the representative of the 57th District. In between her leaving office in 2016 and returning in 2024 Lenawee was represented by Bronna Kahle and Dale Zorn who are also both Republicans and prior to her first term the district was successively represented by brothers Doug and Dudley Spade, both Democrats.

Lenawee is also part of the 30th, 31st, and 35th districts of the Michigan House of Representatives and is represented by William Bruck, Reggie Miller, and Jennifer Wortz respectively. Most of Lenawee is part of the 16th Senate District, represented by Joe Bellino of Monroe, Michigan. It is also part of the 15th Senate district, represented by Jeff Irwin.

Until the 2014 state senate election, Lenawee County was part of the 16th State Senate District, represented by Republican Bruce Caswell. The district contained all of Lenawee, Hillsdale, and Branch counties.

=== Elected county officials ===
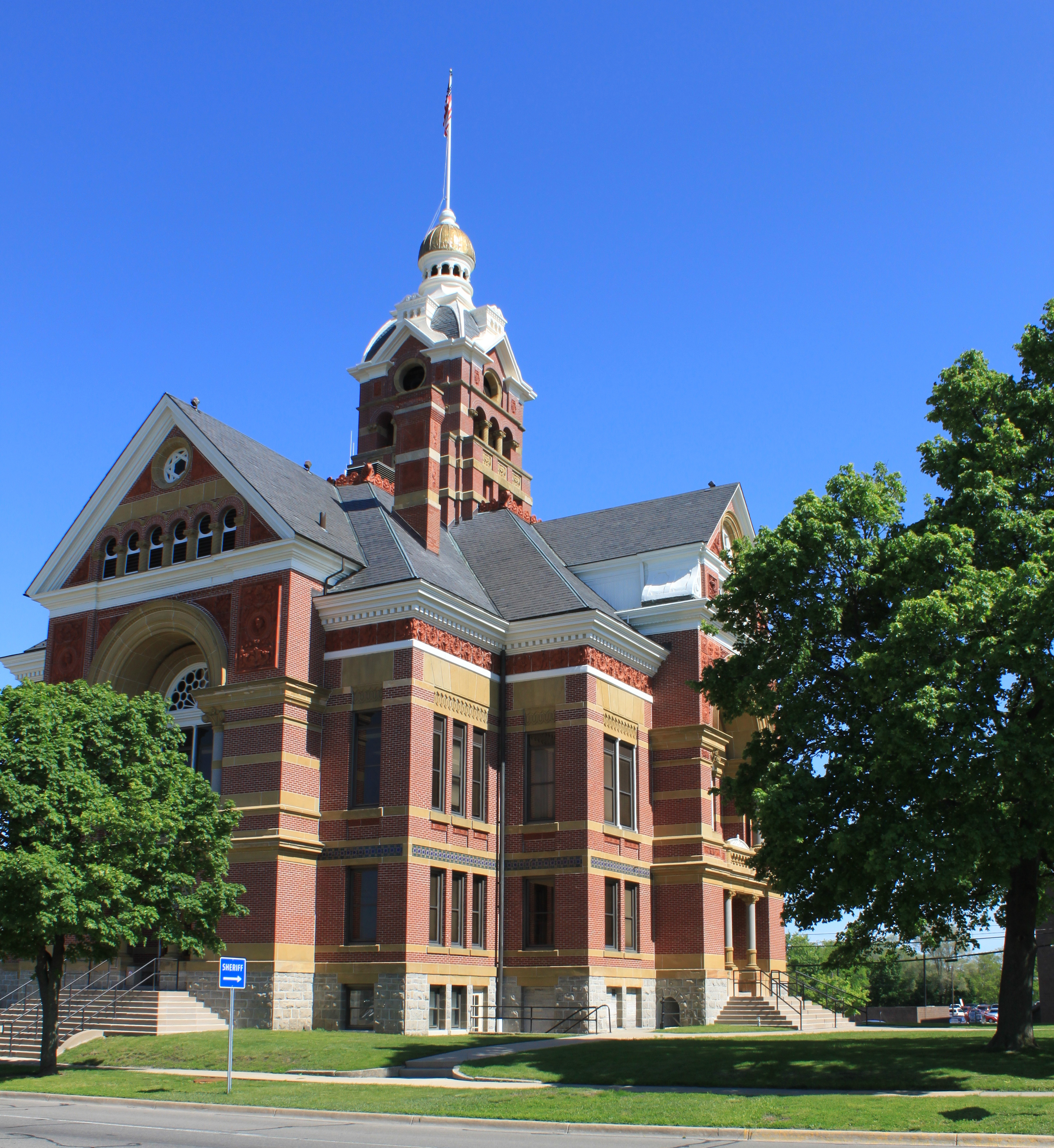
Lenawee County Courthouse, Adrian

- Prosecuting Attorney: Jacqueline V. Wyse (R)
- Sheriff: Troy Bevier (R)
- County Clerk: Roxann Holloway (R)
- County Treasurer: Erin Van Dyke (R)
- Register of Deeds: Carolyn S. Bater (R)
- Drain Commissioner: Edwin Scheffler (R)
- County Surveyor: Kevin Pickford (R)

Current as of September 21, 2023

==== County Commission ====
- District 1: David Stimpson (R)
- District 2: Dustin Krasny (R), commission vice-chair
- District 3: David Aungst (R)
- District 4: Beth Blanco (R)
- District 5: Gordon Gauss (I)
- District 6: Terry Collins (R)
- District 7: Kevon Martis (R)
- District 8: Ralph Tillotson (R)
- District 9: Jim Van Doren (R), commission chair

Current as of January 7, 2023

=== Law enforcement agencies ===
==== County ====
- Lenawee County Sheriff's Office

==== City/Village ====
- Adrian City Police
- Blissfield Police
- Clinton Police
- Hudson Police
- Morenci Police
- Tecumseh Police

==== Township ====
- Adrian Township Police
- Cambridge Township Police
- Columbia Township Police
- Madison Township Police
- Raisin Township Police

==== Special ====
- Adrian & Blissfield Railroad Police

== Communities ==
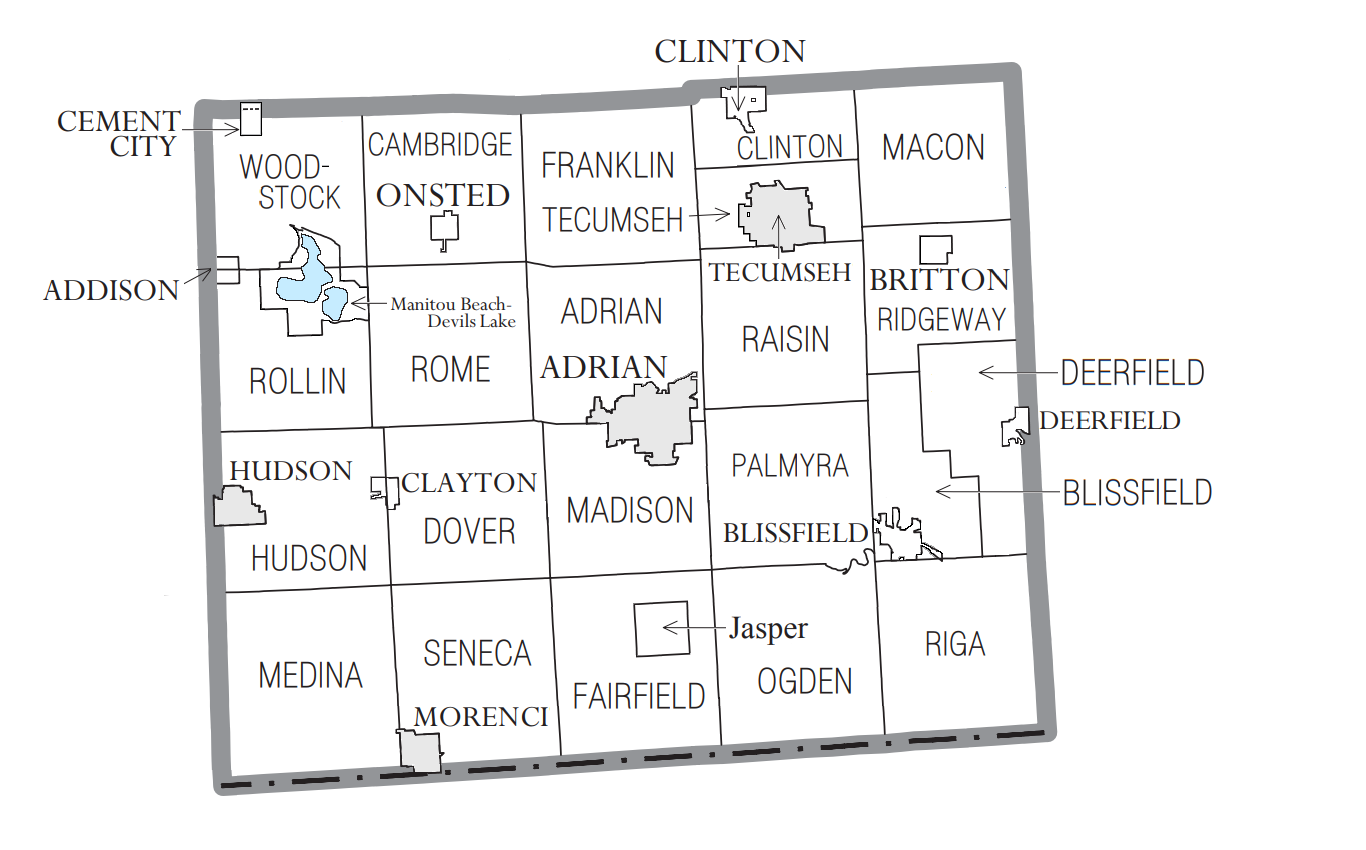
U.S. Census data map showing local municipal boundaries within Lenawee County, as well as two CDP boundaries. Shaded areas represent incorporated cities.

=== Cities ===
- Adrian (county seat)
- Hudson
- Morenci
- Tecumseh

=== Villages ===
- Addison
- Blissfield
- Britton
- Cement City (partial)
- Clayton
- Clinton
- Deerfield
- Onsted

=== Charter townships ===
- Adrian Charter Township
- Madison Charter Township
- Raisin Charter Township

=== Civil townships ===
- Blissfield Township
- Cambridge Township
- Clinton Township
- Deerfield Township
- Dover Township
- Fairfield Township
- Franklin Township
- Hudson Township
- Macon Township
- Medina Township
- Ogden Township
- Palmyra Township
- Ridgeway Township
- Riga Township
- Rollin Township
- Rome Township
- Seneca Township
- Tecumseh Township
- Woodstock Township

=== Census-designated places ===
- Jasper (called Fairfield before 1874)
- Manitou Beach–Devils Lake

=== Other unincorporated communities ===
- Addison Junction
- Birdsall
- Cadmus
- Cambridge Junction
- Canandaigua
- Devil's Lake Estates
- Devils Lake
- Fairfield
- Geneva
- Holloway
- Lenawee Junction
- Lime Creek
- Macon
- Madison Center
- Manitou Beach
- Medina
- Mulberry
- Munson
- Newburg
- North Morenci
- Oak Shade Park
- Ogden Center
- Ogden
- Palmyra
- Raisin Center
- Ridgeville
- Ridgeway
- Riga
- Rollin
- Rome Center
- Round Lake Estates
- Sand Creek
- Seneca
- South Fairfield
- Southland
- Springville
- Tipton
- Wellsville
- Weston

== Education ==
School districts include:

- Addison Community Schools
- Adrian City School District
- Blissfield Community Schools
- Britton Deerfield School District
- Columbia School District
- Clinton Community Schools
- Hudson Area Schools
- Madison School District
- Morenci Area Schools
- Onsted Community Schools
- Sand Creek Community Schools
- Tecumseh Public Schools
- Waldron Area Schools
- Whiteford Agricultural School District

== See also ==
- List of Michigan State Historic Sites in Lenawee County
- National Register of Historic Places listings in Lenawee County, Michigan
- Disappearance of Dee Ann Warner
