= M-156 (Michigan highway) =

State highway in Lenawee County, Michigan, United States

M-156

Route information
- Maintained by MDOT
- Length: 10.665 mi (17.164 km)
- Existed: c. 1931–present

Major junctions
- South end: SR 108 in Morenci
- North end: M-34 in Clayton

Location
- Country: United States
- State: Michigan
- Counties: Lenawee

Highway system
- Michigan State Trunkline Highway System; Interstate; US; State; Byways
← M-155	→ M-157

M-156 is a state trunkline highway in the US state of Michigan. The highway is entirely within Lenawee County and begins in Morenci at the Ohio state line with State Route 108 (SR 108) and runs north to M-34 at Clayton. The highway runs through farm land along Lime Creek outside of the two communities, providing access to the Lake Hudson State Recreation Area. The trunkline dates back to the early 1930s, and has been unchanged since a realignment in 1980.

== Route description ==
SR 108 crosses into Michigan on the southern edge of Morenci where it becomes M-156. From there the road continues northward on East Street through residential neighborhoods for about two-thirds mile (1.1 km) to Main Street near downtown where it turns west. The trunkline follows Main Street for three few blocks before turning north on North Street. The highway exits town near the Oak Grove Cemetery. M-156 follows Lime Creek Highway, which runs parallel to the stream of the same name, through farm land. Near the intersection with Morenci Highway, M-156 crosses a line of the Norfolk Southern Railway in the community of Seneca. North of the rail crossing, M-156 follows Morenci Highway northward and passes to the east of Lake Hudson and the Lake Hudson State Recreation Area before terminating at a junction with M-34 in Clayton.

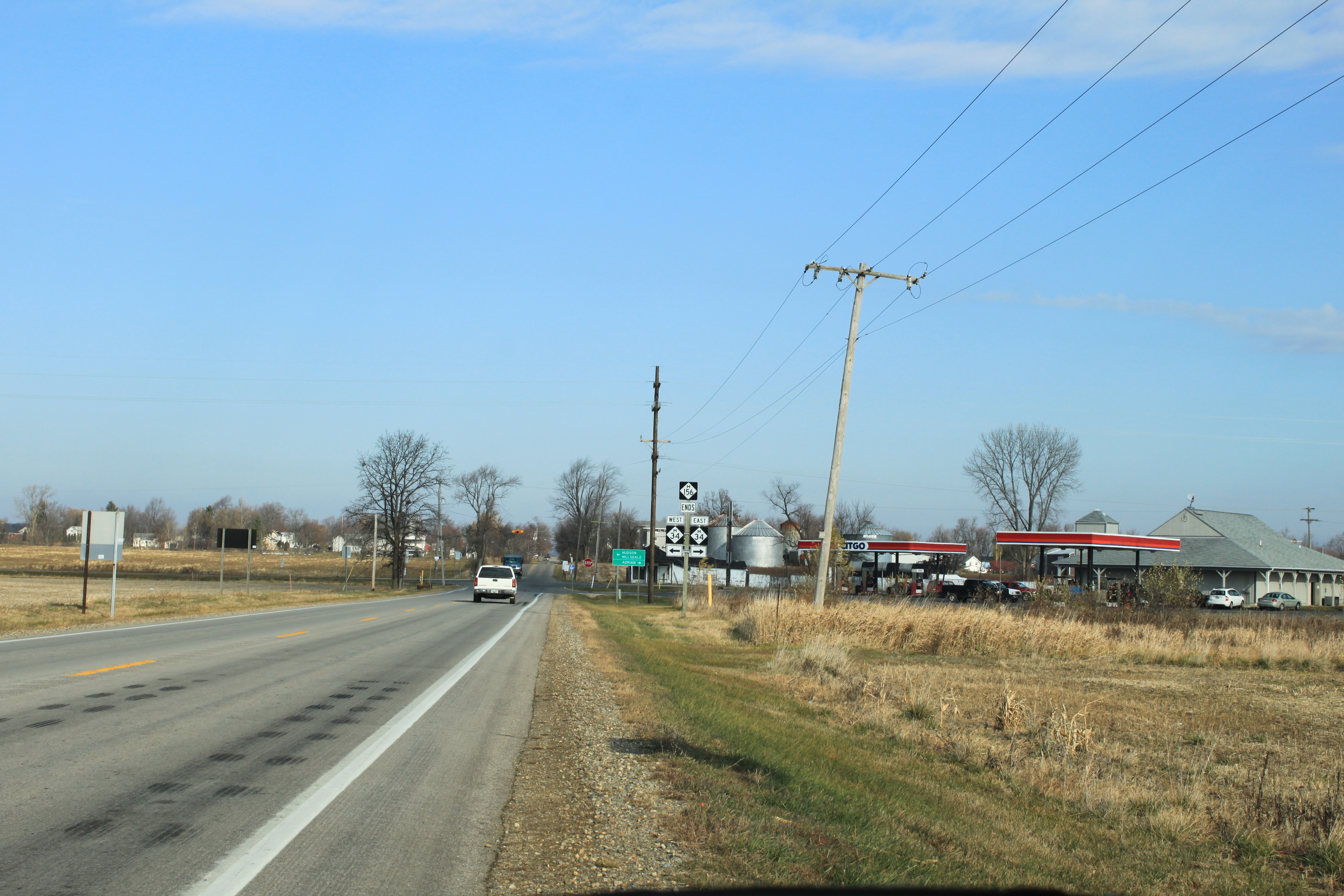
M-156 northern terminus, Clayton

Like other state highways in Michigan, M-156 is maintained by the Michigan Department of Transportation (MDOT). In 2011, the department's traffic surveys showed that on average, 4,235 vehicles used the highway daily along Main Street in Morenci and 1,412 vehicles did so each day near the state line, the highest and lowest counts along the highway, respectively. No section of M-156 is listed on the National Highway System, a network of roads important to the country's economy, defense, and mobility.

== History ==
M-156 was designated along its current routing in late 1931 or early 1932. It was fully paved by the middle of 1936. The highway was unchanged until a series of curves were changed north of Morenci. After the construction was finished, the former segments of highway were abandoned as a public roadway on April 3, 1980.

== Major intersections ==
The entire highway is in Lenawee County.

Location	mi	km	Destinations	Notes
Morenci	0.000	0.000	SR 108 south – Wauseon	Ohio state line
Clayton	10.665	17.164	M-34 – Hudson, Hillsdale, Adrian	
1.000 mi = 1.609 km; 1.000 km = 0.621 mi
