= Dover Township, Lenawee County, Michigan =

Dover Township, Michigan
- Civil township
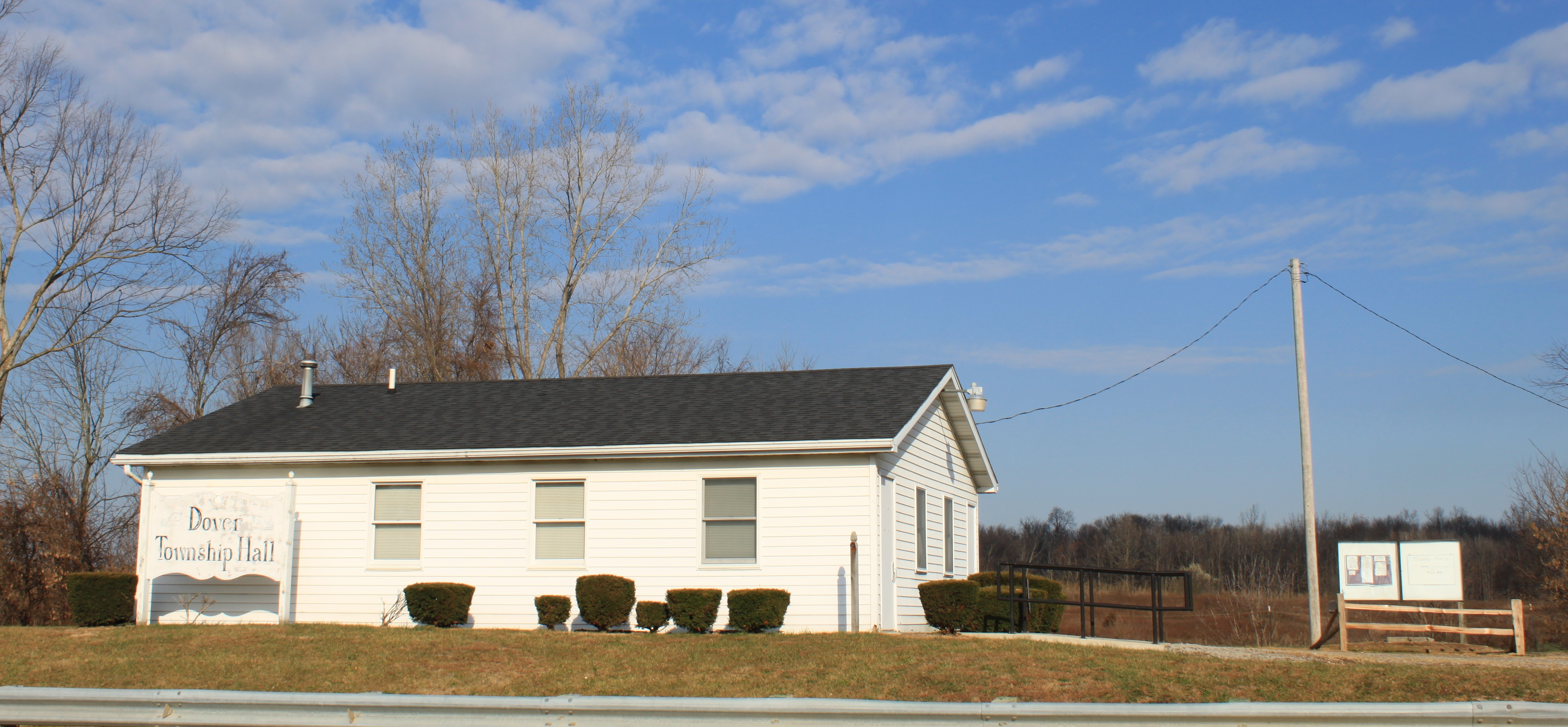
- Dover Township Hall along M-34

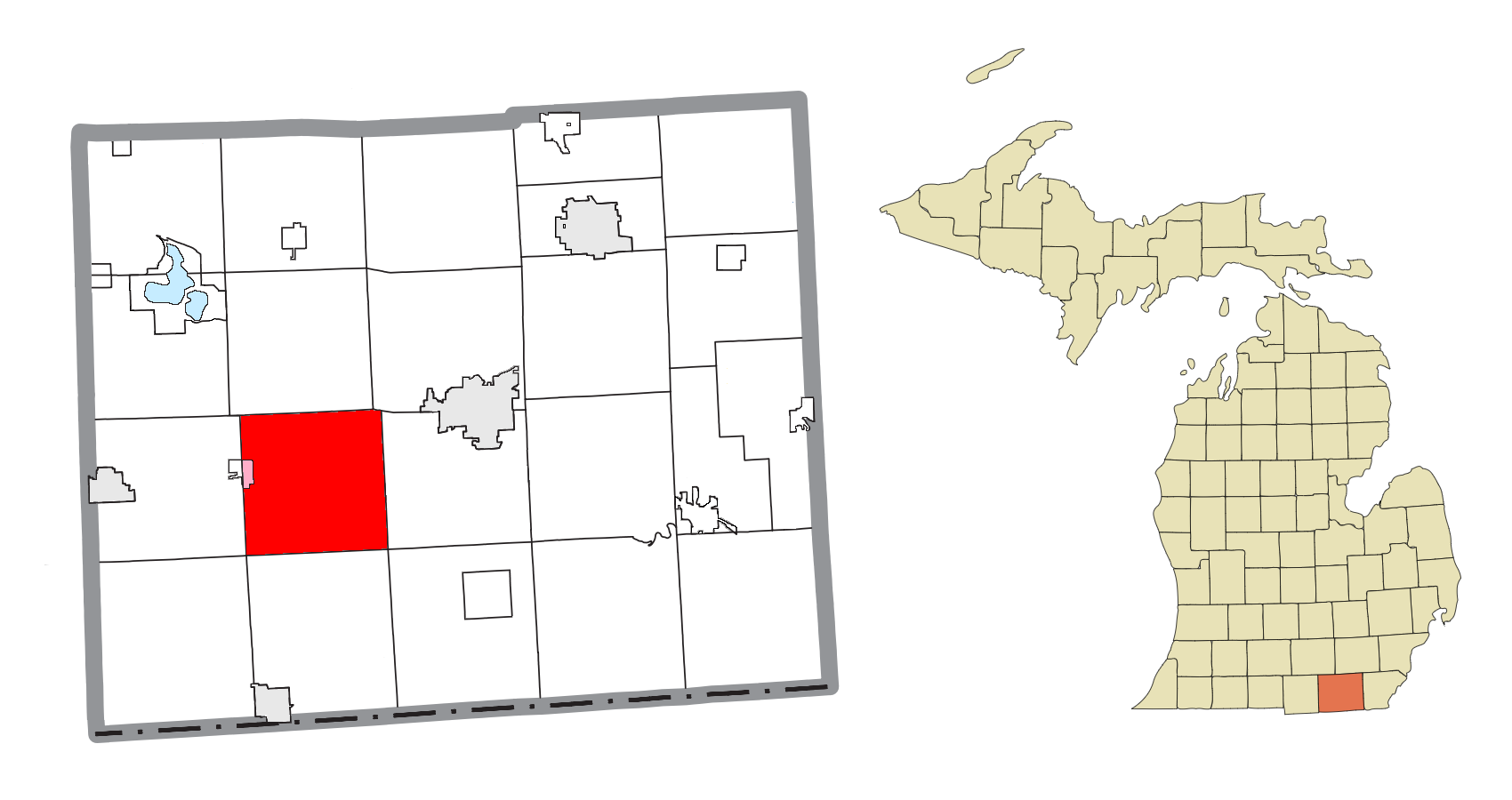
- Location within Lenawee County (red) and an administered portion of the village of Clayton (pink)

- Location within the state of Michigan Dover Township (the United States)
- Coordinates: 41°51′02″N 84°10′09″W
- Country: United States
- State: Michigan
- County: Lenawee

Government
  - Supervisor: Dan Borck
  - Clerk: Amber Swander

Area
  - Total: 35.2 sq mi (91.1 km^{2})
  - Land: 35.1 sq mi (90.9 km^{2})
  - Water: 0.12 sq mi (0.3 km^{2})
- Elevation: 820 ft (250 m)

Population (2020)
  - Total: 1,662
  - Density: 47.4/sq mi (18.3/km^{2})
- Time zone: UTC-5 (Eastern (EST))
  - Summer (DST): UTC-4 (EDT)
- ZIP code(s): 49221 (Adrian); 49235 (Clayton); 49279 (Sand Creek)
- Area code: 517
- FIPS code: 26-22820
- GNIS feature ID: 1626189
- Website: https://www.dovertownshipmi.com/

Dover Township is a civil township in Lenawee County in the U.S. state of Michigan. As of the 2020 census, the township population was 1,662.

== Communities ==
- Cadmus was established in 1887.
- Dover was the name of a former post office in the township. The office opened with the name Unionville on January 15, 1836, with James Phillips as the first postmaster. The office was closed April 22, 1842, and reopened with the name Dover on November 22, 1842. The office operated until November 29, 1867.

== Geography ==
According to the United States Census Bureau, the township has a total area of 35.2 square miles (91 km^{2}), of which 35.1 square miles (91 km^{2}) is land and 0.1 square miles (0.26 km^{2}) (0.28%) is water.

== Demographics ==
As of the census of 2000, there were 1,787 people, 650 households, and 501 families residing in the township. The population density was 50.9 inhabitants per square mile (19.7/km^{2}). There were 686 housing units at an average density of 19.6 per square mile (7.6/km^{2}). The racial makeup of the township was 97.54% White, 0.28% African American, 0.28% Native American, 0.17% Asian, 0.90% from other races, and 0.84% from two or more races. Hispanic or Latino of any race were 3.58% of the population.

There were 650 households, out of which 33.8% had children under the age of 18 living with them, 66.2% were married couples living together, 7.1% had a female householder with no husband present, and 22.8% were non-families. 17.8% of all households were made up of individuals, and 5.7% had someone living alone who was 65 years of age or older. The average household size was 2.74 and the average family size was 3.12.

In the township the population was spread out, with 28.3% under the age of 18, 6.5% from 18 to 24, 29.3% from 25 to 44, 25.7% from 45 to 64, and 10.2% who were 65 years of age or older. The median age was 37 years. For every 100 females, there were 106.1 males. For every 100 females age 18 and over, there were 104.8 males.

The median income for a household in the township was $45,329, and the median income for a family was $51,587. Males had a median income of $37,750 versus $24,148 for females. The per capita income for the township was $18,299. About 8.8% of families and 10.7% of the population were below the poverty line, including 14.1% of those under age 18 and 10.4% of those age 65 or over.
