= Hudson Township, Lenawee County, Michigan =

Hudson Township, Michigan
- Civil township
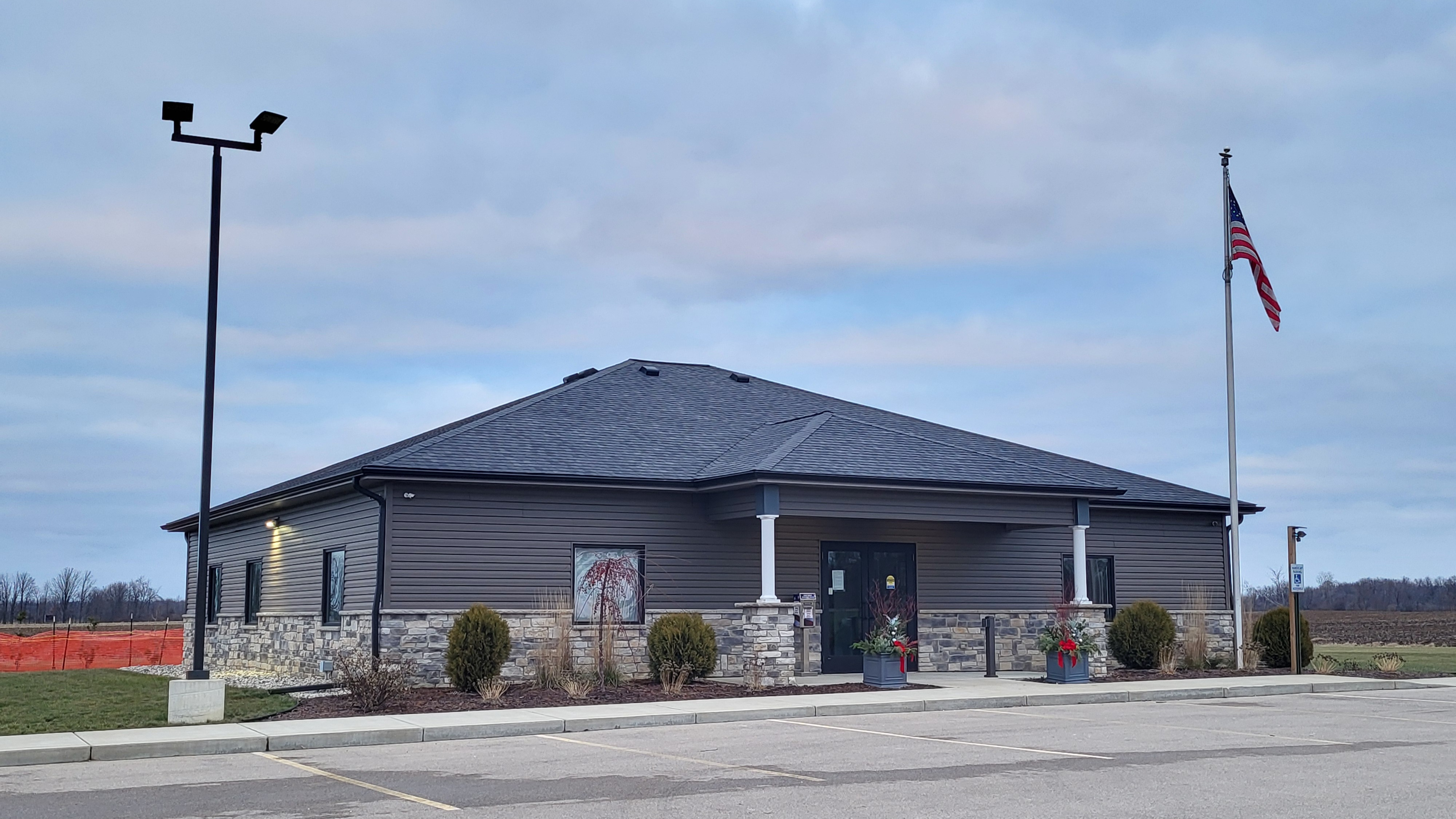
- Hudson Township Hall

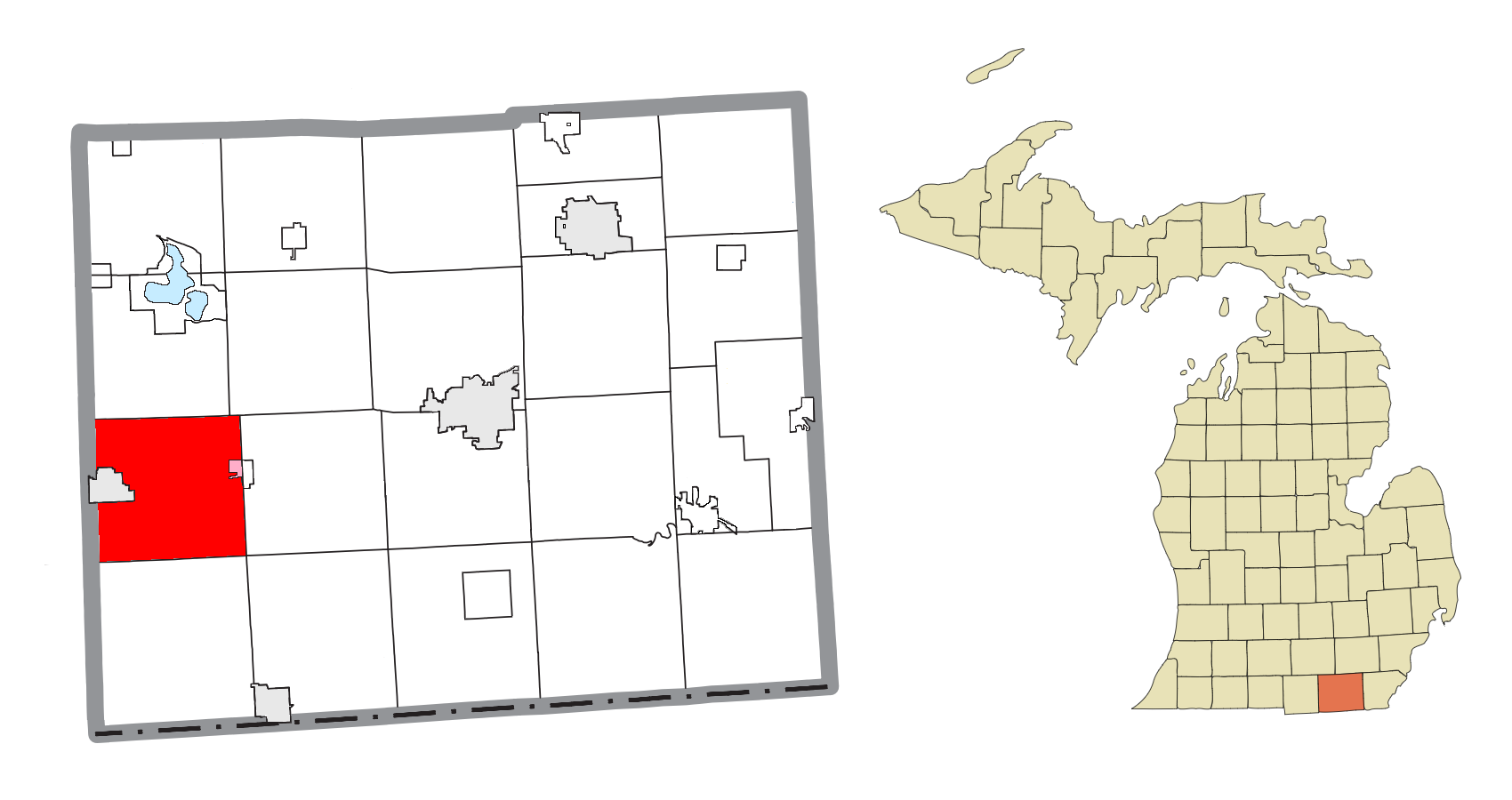
- Location within Lenawee County (red) and an administered portion of the Clayton village (pink)

- Location within the state of Michigan Location within the United States
- Coordinates: 41°51′04″N 84°18′06″W
- Country: United States
- State: Michigan
- County: Lenawee
- Established: 1896

Government
  - Supervisor: Matt Smith
  - Clerk: Marcy Griffin

Area
  - Total: 36.46 sq mi (94.43 km^{2})
  - Land: 35.39 sq mi (91.66 km^{2})
  - Water: 1.07 sq mi (2.77 km^{2})
- Elevation: 896 ft (273 m)

Population (2020)
  - Total: 1,499
  - Density: 42.4/sq mi (16.4/km^{2})
- Time zone: UTC-5 (Eastern (EST))
  - Summer (DST): UTC-4 (EDT)
- ZIP code(s): 49235 (Clayton); 49247 (Hudson)
- Area code: 517
- FIPS code: 26-39740
- GNIS feature ID: 1626499
- Website: Official website

Hudson Township is a civil township of Lenawee County in the U.S. state of Michigan. The population was 1,499 at the 2020 census. The city of Hudson borders the township on the west, but the two are administered autonomously.

== Geography ==
According to the United States Census Bureau, the township has a total area of 36.46 square miles (94.43 km^{2}), of which 35.39 square miles (91.66 km^{2}) is land and 1.07 square miles (2.8 km^{2}) (2.93%) is water. Lake Hudson State Recreation Area is located within Hudson Township.

== Demographics ==
As of the census of 2000, there were 1,576 people, 597 households, and 437 families residing in the township. The population density was 44.5 inhabitants per square mile (17.2/km^{2}). There were 719 housing units at an average density of 20.3 per square mile (7.8/km^{2}). The racial makeup of the township was 98.03% White, 0.06% African American, 0.06% Native American, 0.06% Asian, 1.21% from other races, and 0.57% from two or more races. Hispanic or Latino of any race were 2.60% of the population.

There were 597 households, out of which 27.1% had children under the age of 18 living with them, 63.8% were married couples living together, 5.7% had a female householder with no husband present, and 26.8% were non-families. 23.6% of all households were made up of individuals, and 12.6% had someone living alone who was 65 years of age or older. The average household size was 2.59 and the average family size was 3.00.

In the township the population was spread out, with 22.8% under the age of 18, 7.3% from 18 to 24, 24.7% from 25 to 44, 28.0% from 45 to 64, and 17.1% who were 65 years of age or older. The median age was 43 years. For every 100 females, there were 102.6 males. For every 100 females age 18 and over, there were 98.7 males.

The median income for a household in the township was $41,354, and the median income for a family was $49,896. Males had a median income of $35,909 versus $24,911 for females. The per capita income for the township was $19,771. About 2.8% of families and 4.3% of the population were below the poverty line, including 5.0% of those under age 18 and 6.6% of those age 65 or over.
