= Clayton, Michigan =

- Village
- Village of Clayton
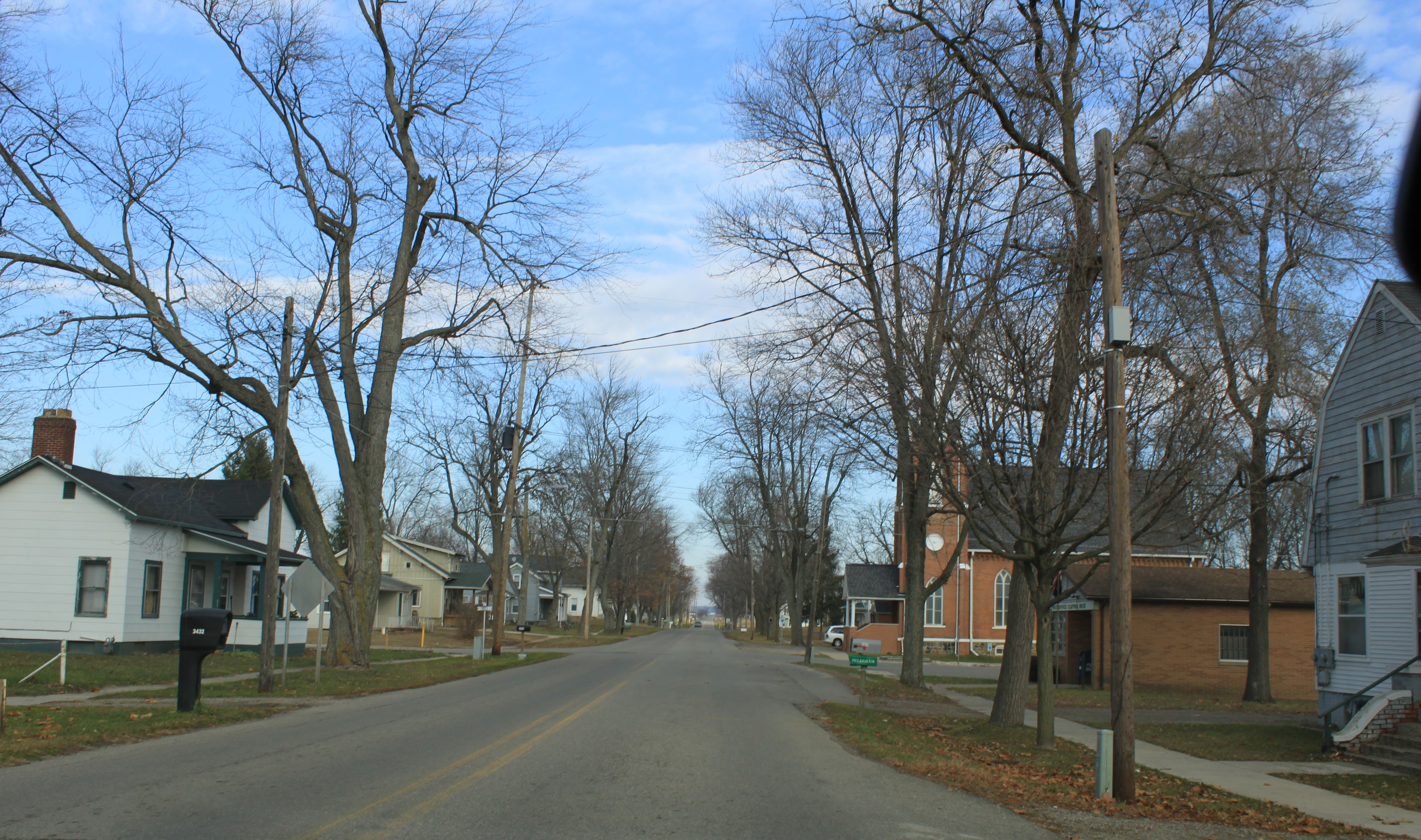
- Facing north along State Street

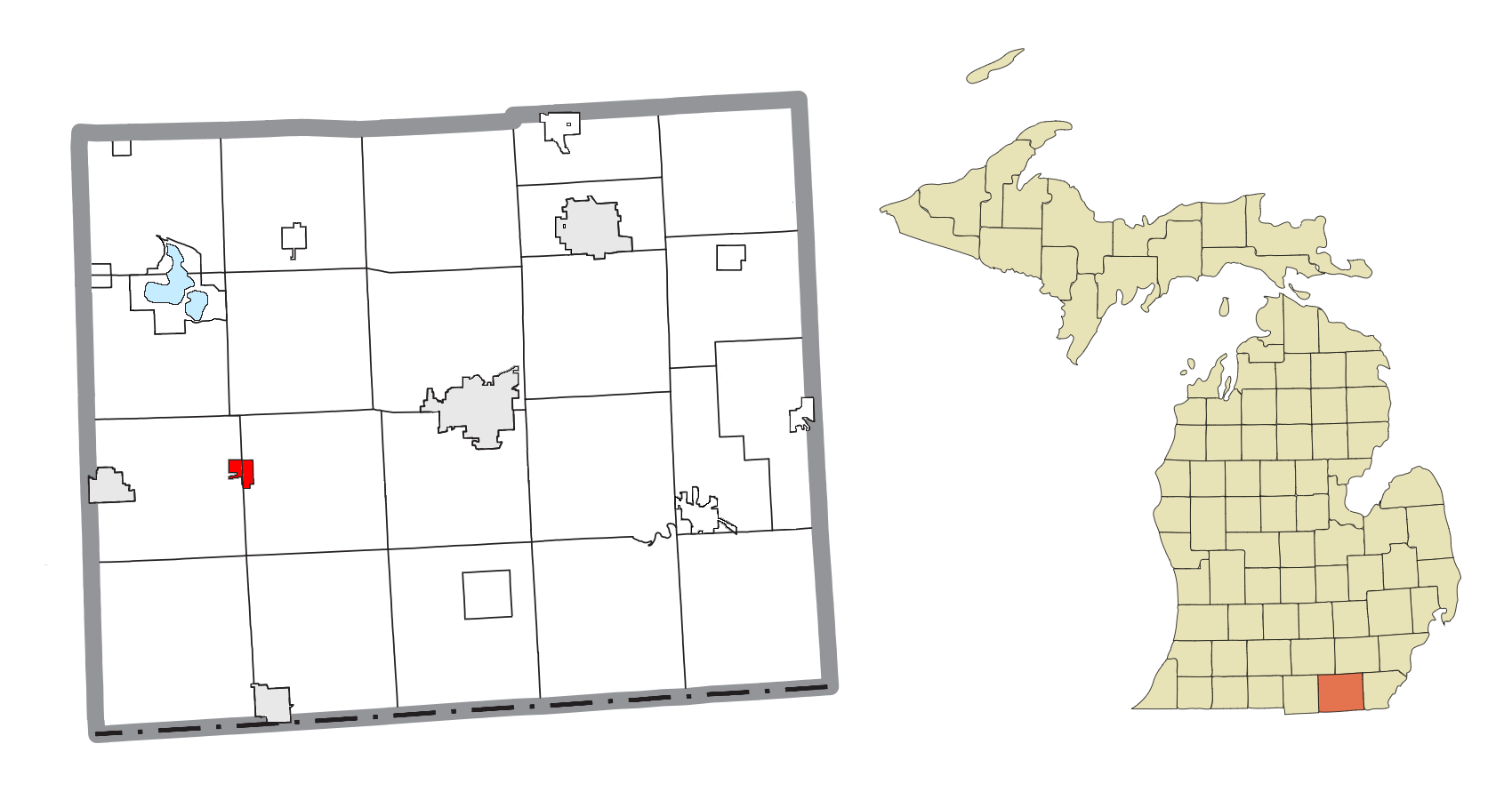
- Location within Lenawee County

- Location within the state of Michigan Location within the United States
- Coordinates: 41°51′49″N 84°14′07″W
- Country: United States
- State: Michigan
- County: Lenawee
- Townships: Dover and Hudson
- Established: 1836
- Platted: 1843
- Incorporated: 1870

Government
  - Type: Village council
  - President: Henry Burrece
  - Clerk: Wendy Mullane

Area
  - Total: 0.71 sq mi (1.84 km^{2})
  - Land: 0.71 sq mi (1.84 km^{2})
  - Water: 0 sq mi (0.00 km^{2})
- Elevation: 896 ft (273 m)

Population (2020)
  - Total: 311
  - Density: 437.1/sq mi (168.77/km^{2})
- Time zone: UTC-5 (Eastern (EST))
  - Summer (DST): UTC-4 (EDT)
- ZIP code(s): 49235
- Area code: 517
- FIPS code: 26-16280
- GNIS feature ID: 0623395
- Website: Official website

Clayton is a village in Lenawee County of the U.S. state of Michigan. The population was 311 at the 2020 census. The village is located within Hudson Township to the west and Dover Township to the east.

== History ==
The community was first settled in 1836 and named East Dover due to its location in eastern Dover Township. A post office began operating in East Dover on March 8, 1837, with Levi Soper serving as the first postmaster. Rueben Bird platted the community in 1843, and he had the post office name changed to Clayton on July 17, 1849, after his friend Reverend Clayton from New York. Clayton was incorporated as a village in 1870.

== Geography ==
According to the U.S. Census Bureau, the village has a total area of 0.71 square miles (1.84 km^{2}), all land.

=== Major highways ===
- M-34 (West Carleton Road) runs east–west near the southern boundary of the village.
- M-156 (Morey Highway) has its northern terminus at M-34.

== Demographics ==
Historical population
| Census | Pop. | Note | %± |
|---|---|---|---|
| 1880 | 368 | | — |
| 1900 | 370 | | — |
| 1910 | 372 | | 0.5% |
| 1920 | 306 | | −17.7% |
| 1930 | 372 | | 21.6% |
| 1940 | 375 | | 0.8% |
| 1950 | 467 | | 24.5% |
| 1960 | 470 | | 0.6% |
| 1970 | 505 | | 7.4% |
| 1980 | 396 | | −21.6% |
| 1990 | 384 | | −3.0% |
| 2000 | 326 | | −15.1% |
| 2010 | 344 | | 5.5% |
| 2020 | 311 | | −9.6% |
U.S. Decennial Census

=== 2010 census ===
As of the census of 2010, there were 344 people, 118 households, and 90 families living in the village. The population density was 484.5 inhabitants per square mile (187.1/km^{2}). There were 131 housing units at an average density of 184.5 per square mile (71.2/km^{2}). The racial makeup of the village was 93.6% White, 1.7% African American, 0.3% Native American, 0.3% Asian, 1.7% from other races, and 2.3% from two or more races. Hispanic or Latino of any race were 5.5% of the population.

There were 118 households, of which 40.7% had children under the age of 18 living with them, 55.1% were married couples living together, 13.6% had a female householder with no husband present, 7.6% had a male householder with no wife present, and 23.7% were non-families. 17.8% of all households were made up of individuals, and 5.1% had someone living alone who was 65 years of age or older. The average household size was 2.92 and the average family size was 3.34.

The median age in the village was 31.5 years. 30.5% of residents were under the age of 18; 8.5% were between the ages of 18 and 24; 31.4% were from 25 to 44; 17.7% were from 45 to 64; and 11.9% were 65 years of age or older. The gender makeup of the village was 52.0% male and 48.0% female.

=== 2000 census ===
As of the census of 2000, there were 326 people, 113 households, and 83 families living in the village. The population density was 428.2 inhabitants per square mile (165.3/km^{2}). There were 120 housing units at an average density of 157.6 per square mile (60.8/km^{2}). The racial makeup of the village was 96.63% White, 0.31% African American, 0.31% Native American, 1.23% from other races, and 1.53% from two or more races. Hispanic or Latino of any race were 2.45% of the population.

There were 113 households, out of which 34.5% had children under the age of 18 living with them, 59.3% were married couples living together, 8.0% had a female householder with no husband present, and 25.7% were non-families. 19.5% of all households were made up of individuals, and 8.0% had someone living alone who was 65 years of age or older. The average household size was 2.88 and the average family size was 3.31.

In the village, the population was spread out, with 29.1% under the age of 18, 11.0% from 18 to 24, 26.4% from 25 to 44, 23.6% from 45 to 64, and 9.8% who were 65 years of age or older. The median age was 31 years. For every 100 females, there were 102.5 males. For every 100 females age 18 and over, there were 108.1 males.

The median income for a household in the village was $41,875, and the median income for a family was $46,172. Males had a median income of $30,000 versus $20,000 for females. The per capita income for the village was $17,941. About 5.5% of families and 6.5% of the population were below the poverty line, including 4.8% of those under age 18 and 10.0% of those age 65 or over.

== Education ==
The village of Clayton is served by Hudson Area Schools to the west in the city of Hudson.

== Images ==
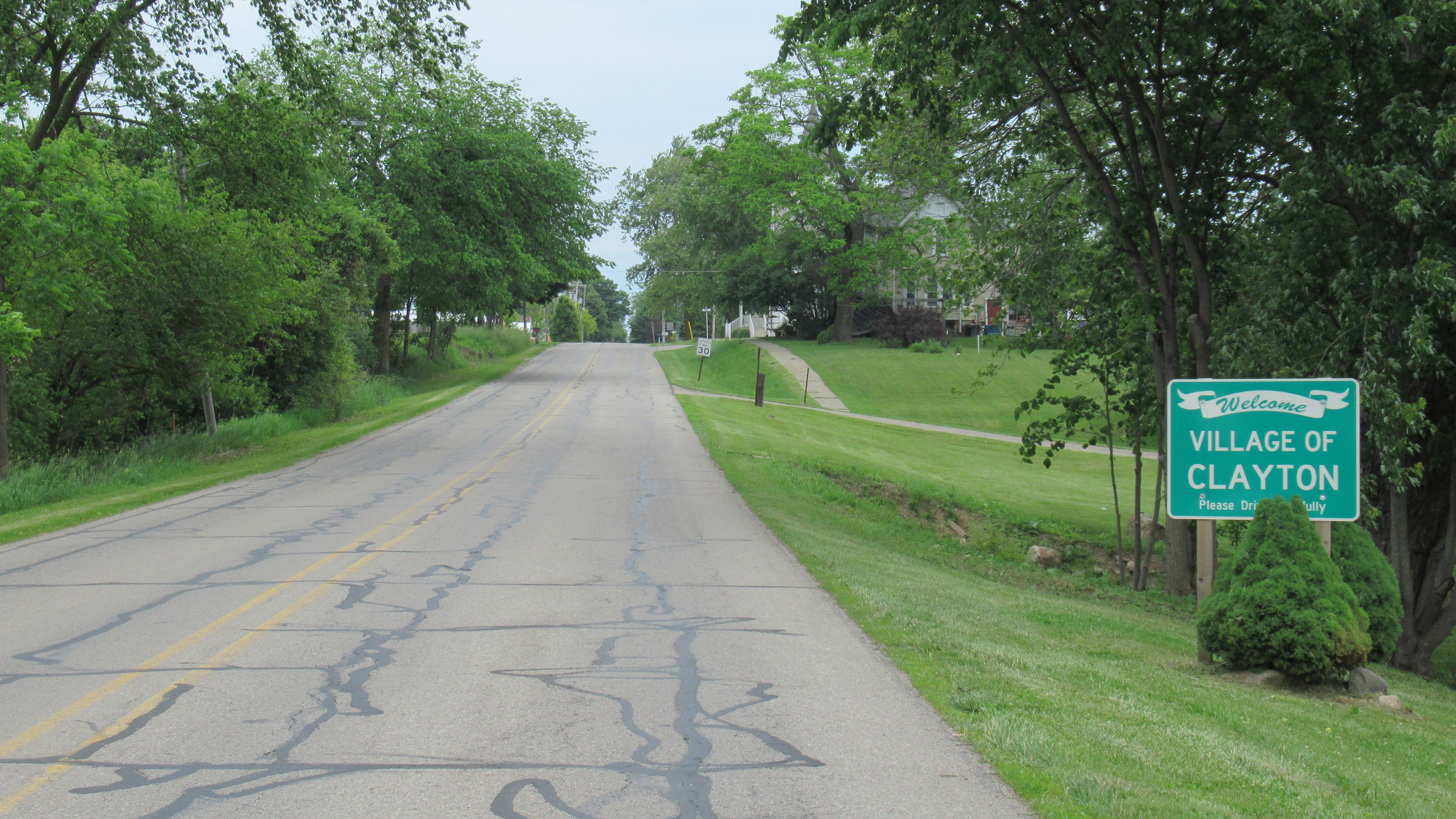
Signage along Morey Highway

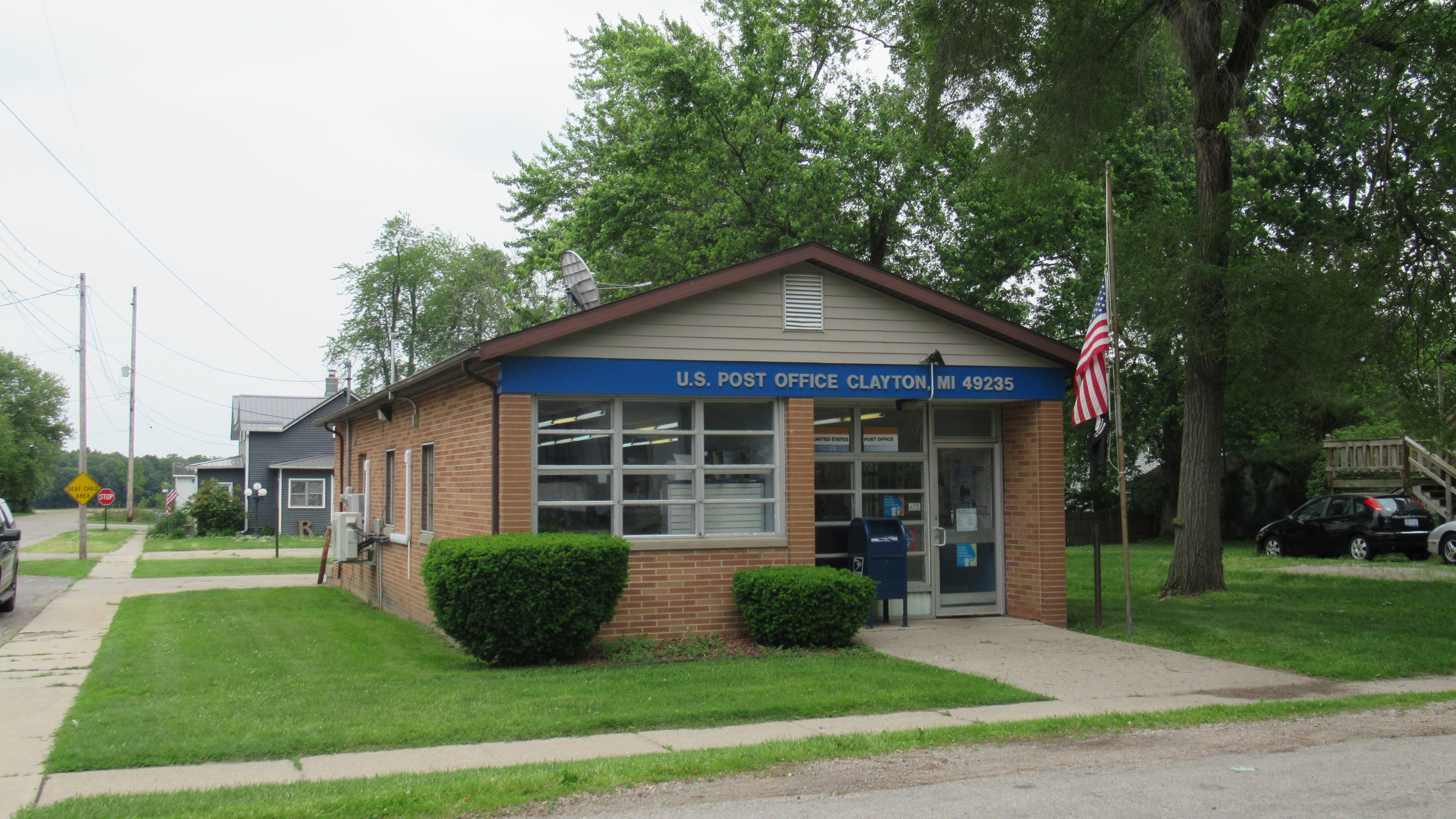
U.S. Post Office in Clayton

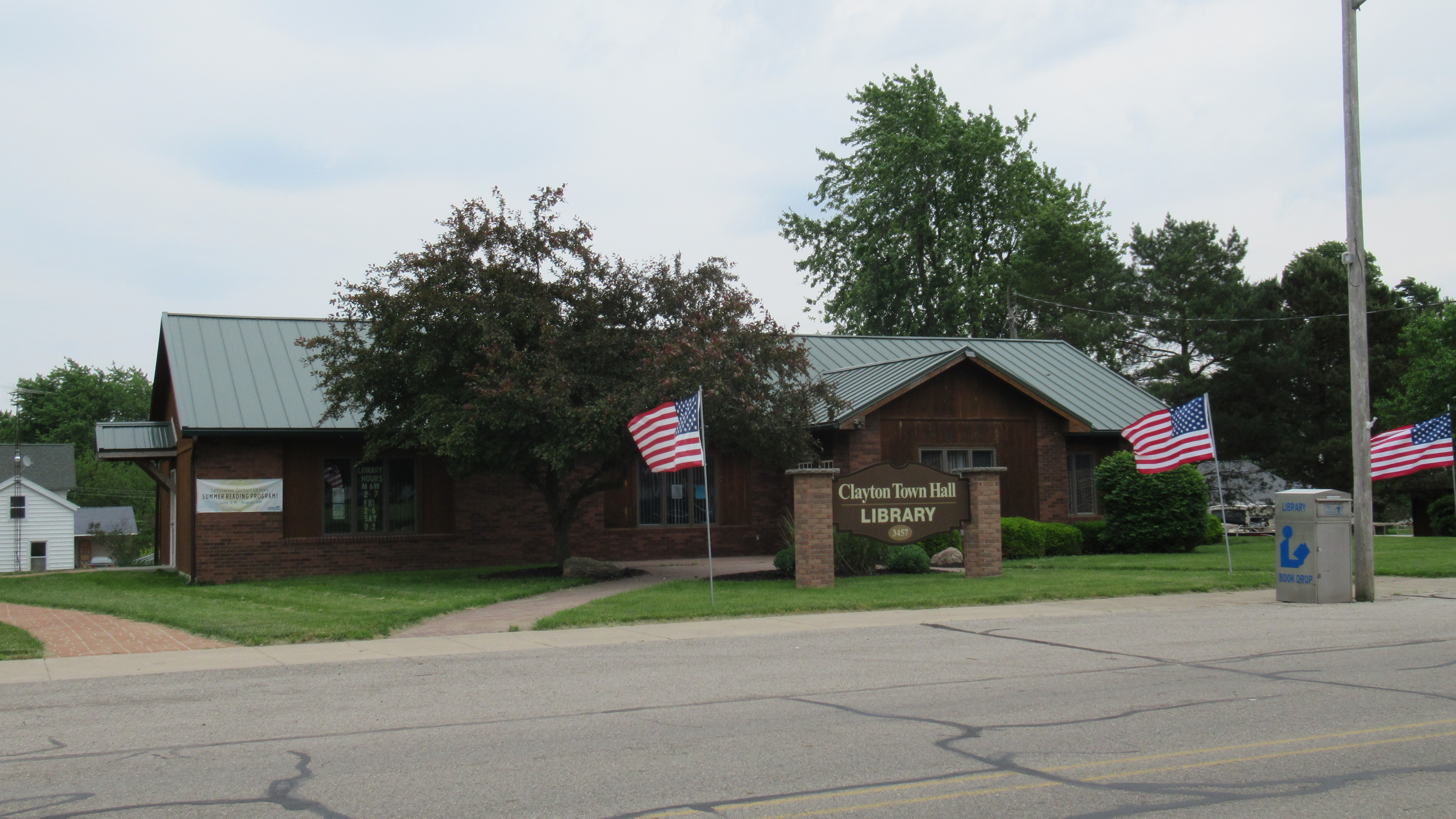
Clayton Town Hall and Library
