= Morenci, Michigan =

- City
- City of Morenci
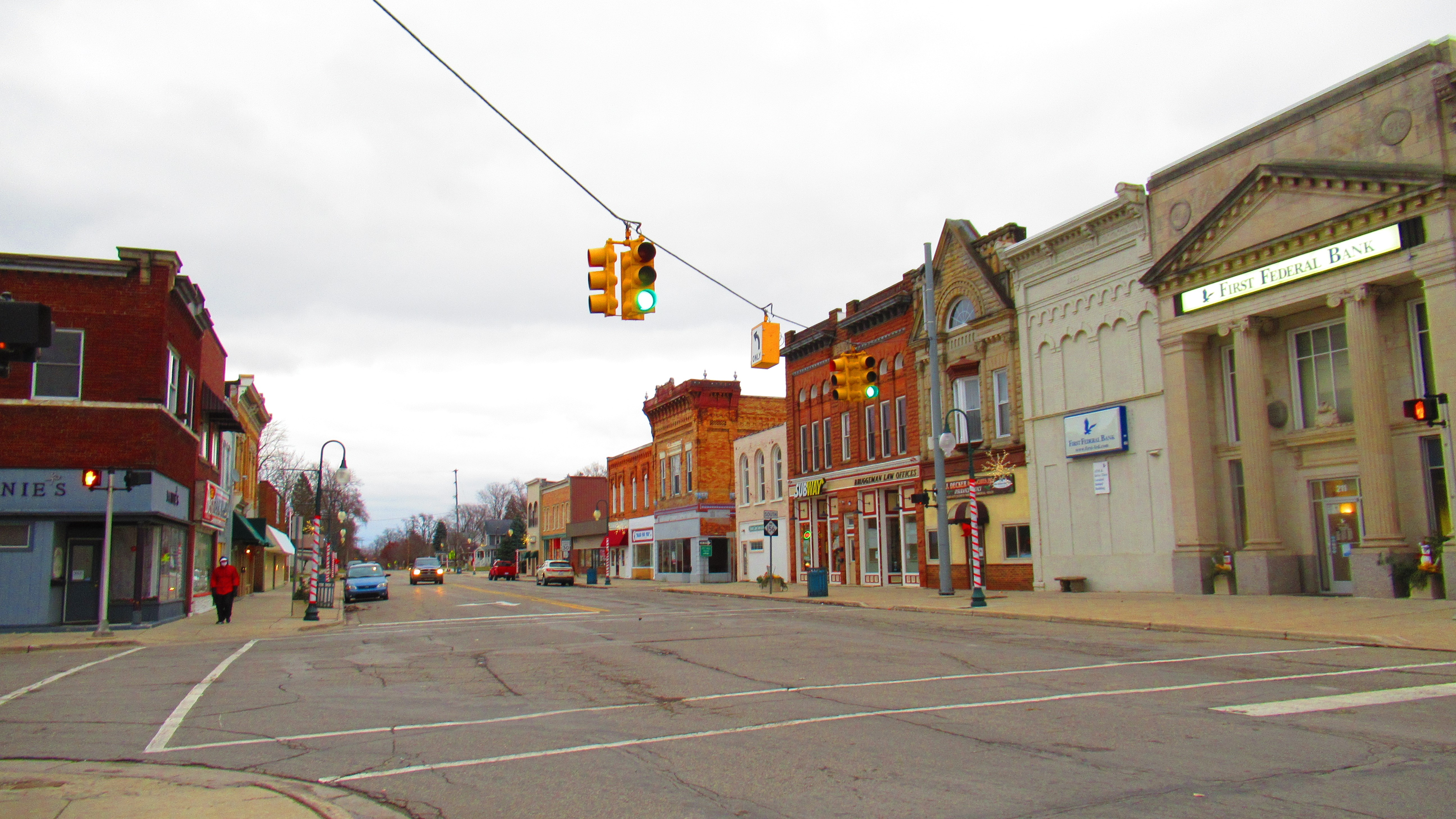
- Downtown along Main Street (M-156)

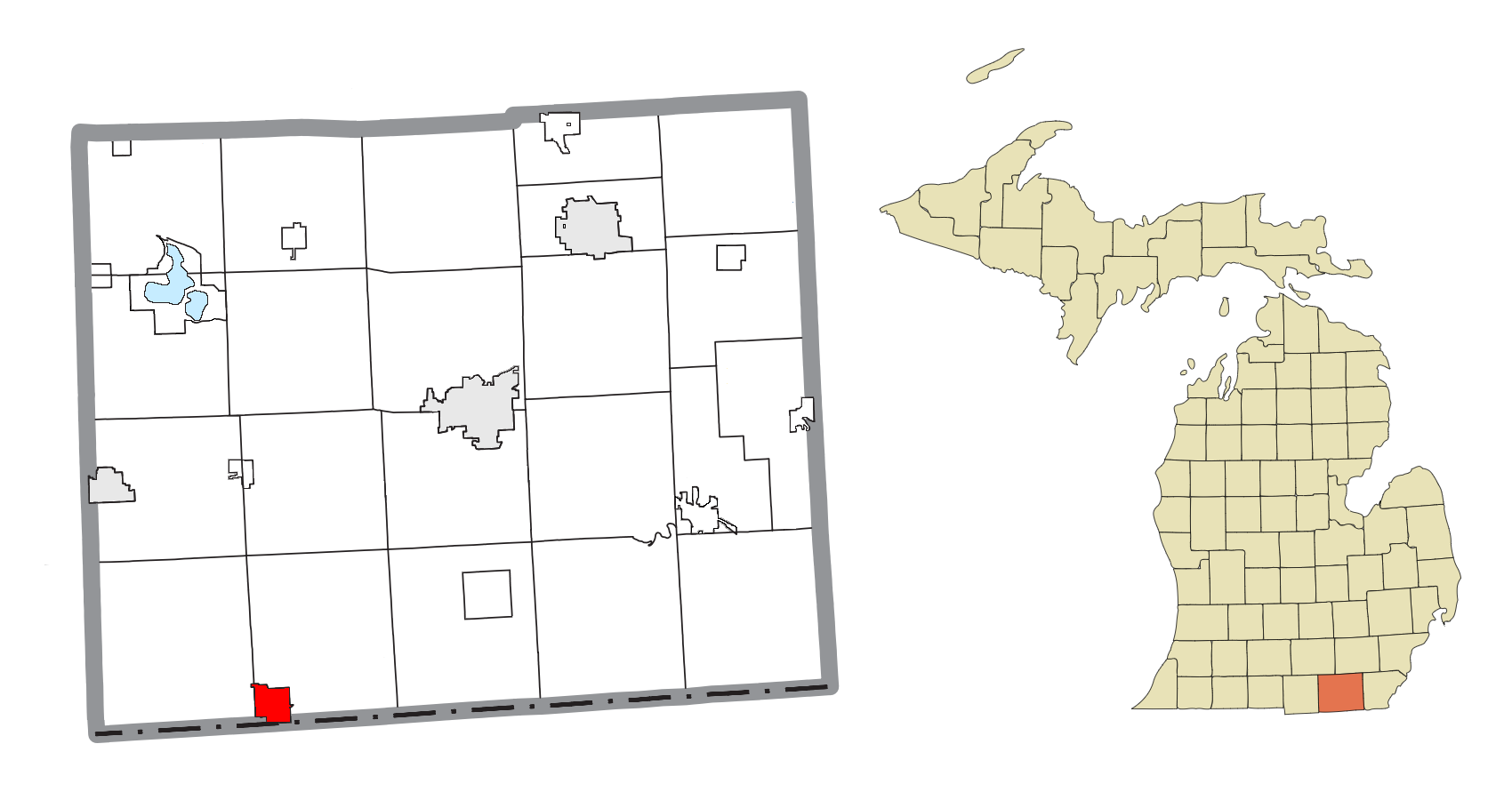
- Location within Lenawee County

- Location in Michigan Location in the United States
- Coordinates: 41°43′15″N 84°12′59″W
- Country: United States
- State: Michigan
- County: Lenawee
- Settled: 1833

Government
  - Type: Mayor–council
  - Mayor: Tracy Schell

Area
  - Total: 2.12 sq mi (5.49 km^{2})
  - Land: 2.12 sq mi (5.49 km^{2})
  - Water: 0 sq mi (0.00 km^{2})
- Elevation: 764 ft (233 m)

Population (2020)
  - Total: 2,270
  - Density: 1,071.0/sq mi (413.51/km^{2})
- Time zone: UTC-5 (Eastern (EST))
  - Summer (DST): UTC-4 (EDT)
- ZIP code(s): 49256
- Area code: 517
- FIPS code: 26-55500
- GNIS feature ID: 0632677
- Website: www.cityofmorenci.org

Morenci is a city in Lenawee County in the U.S. state of Michigan. Sharing a southern boundary with the state of Ohio, it is the southernmost city in the state of Michigan. The population was 2,270 at the 2020 census.

== History ==
The settlement of Morenci began in 1833. The Chicago and Canada Southern Railway opened a railway line through Morenci to Fayette, Ohio, in 1872. This line was abandoned in 1991.

== Geography ==
According to the United States Census Bureau, the city has a total area of 2.12 square miles (5.49 km^{2}), all land.

=== Climate ===
Climate data for Morenci, Michigan (1991–2020)
Month	Jan	Feb	Mar	Apr	May	Jun	Jul	Aug	Sep	Oct	Nov	Dec	Year
Mean daily maximum °F (°C)	32.9 (0.5)	36.2 (2.3)	46.6 (8.1)	60.1 (15.6)	72.0 (22.2)	81.5 (27.5)	85.5 (29.7)	83.1 (28.4)	76.2 (24.6)	62.8 (17.1)	49.0 (9.4)	37.3 (2.9)	60.3 (15.7)
Daily mean °F (°C)	23.8 (−4.6)	25.8 (−3.4)	35.3 (1.8)	46.8 (8.2)	58.8 (14.9)	68.5 (20.3)	71.8 (22.1)	69.7 (20.9)	62.4 (16.9)	50.3 (10.2)	38.8 (3.8)	28.8 (−1.8)	48.4 (9.1)
Mean daily minimum °F (°C)	14.7 (−9.6)	15.5 (−9.2)	24.0 (−4.4)	33.6 (0.9)	45.6 (7.6)	55.5 (13.1)	58.0 (14.4)	56.4 (13.6)	48.6 (9.2)	37.8 (3.2)	28.5 (−1.9)	20.4 (−6.4)	36.6 (2.5)
Average precipitation inches (mm)	2.33 (59)	2.33 (59)	2.77 (70)	3.58 (91)	4.05 (103)	3.84 (98)	3.82 (97)	3.76 (96)	3.14 (80)	2.95 (75)	3.04 (77)	2.48 (63)	38.09 (968)
Average snowfall inches (cm)	9.8 (25)	8.1 (21)	5.2 (13)	0.8 (2.0)	0.0 (0.0)	0.0 (0.0)	0.0 (0.0)	0.0 (0.0)	0.0 (0.0)	0.0 (0.0)	1.5 (3.8)	6.6 (17)	32 (81.8)
Source: NOAA

== Demographics ==
Historical population
Census	Pop.	Note	%±
1860	459		—
1880	1,209		—
1890	1,248		3.2%
1900	1,334		6.9%
1910	1,515		13.6%
1920	1,697		12.0%
1930	1,773		4.5%
1940	1,845		4.1%
1950	1,983		7.5%
1960	2,053		3.5%
1970	2,132		3.8%
1980	2,110		−1.0%
1990	2,342		11.0%
2000	2,398		2.4%
2010	2,220		−7.4%
2020	2,270		2.3%
U.S. Decennial Census

=== 2020 census ===
As of the 2020 census, Morenci had a population of 2,270. The median age was 37.3 years. 26.0% of residents were under the age of 18 and 16.2% of residents were 65 years of age or older. For every 100 females, there were 95.7 males, and for every 100 females age 18 and over, there were 94.8 males age 18 and over.

0.0% of residents lived in urban areas, while 100.0% lived in rural areas.

There were 863 households in Morenci, of which 33.4% had children under the age of 18 living in them. Of all households, 45.9% were married-couple households, 18.2% were households with a male householder and no spouse or partner present, and 25.7% were households with a female householder and no spouse or partner present. About 26.5% of all households were made up of individuals and 13.1% had someone living alone who was 65 years of age or older.

There were 954 housing units, of which 9.5% were vacant. The homeowner vacancy rate was 2.4% and the rental vacancy rate was 11.7%.

Racial composition as of the 2020 census
Race	Number	Percent
White	2,086	91.9%
Black or African American	22	1.0%
American Indian and Alaska Native	4	0.2%
Asian	3	0.1%
Native Hawaiian and Other Pacific Islander	0	0.0%
Some other race	29	1.3%
Two or more races	126	5.6%
Hispanic or Latino (of any race)	122	5.4%

=== 2010 census ===
At the 2010 census, there were 2,220 people, 821 households and 582 families living in the city. The population density was 1,047.2 per square mile (404.3/km^{2}). There were 951 housing units at an average density of 448.6 per square mile (173.2/km^{2}). The racial makeup of the city was 96.2% White, 1.0% African American, 0.3% Native American, 0.3% Asian, 0.1% Pacific Islander, 0.7% from other races, and 1.4% from two or more races. Hispanic or Latino of any race were 4.5% of the population.

There were 821 households, of which 39.0% had children under the age of 18 living with them, 51.0% were married couples living together, 13.9% had a female householder with no husband present, 6.0% had a male householder with no wife present, and 29.1% were non-families. 25.7% of all households were made up of individuals, and 13% had someone living alone who was 65 years of age or older. The average household size was 2.68 and the average family size was 3.13.

The median age was 34.1 years. 28.7% of residents were under the age of 18; 8.8% were between the ages of 18 and 24; 26.9% were from 25 to 44; 22.2% were from 45 to 64; and 13.4% were 65 years of age or older. The gender makeup was 48.1% male and 51.9% female.

=== 2000 census ===
At the 2000 census, there were 2,398 people, 877 households and 644 families living in the city. The population density was 1,134.1 inhabitants per square mile (437.9/km^{2}). There were 942 housing units at an average density of 445.5 per square mile (172.0/km^{2}). The racial makeup was 97.00% White, 0.13% African American, 0.33% Native American, 0.33% Asian, 0.63% from other races, and 1.58% from two or more races. Hispanic or Latino of any race were 3.50% of the population.

There were 877 households, of which 39.3% had children under the age of 18 living with them, 56.7% were married couples living together, 11.3% had a female householder with no husband present, and 26.5% were non-families. 22.5% of all households were made up of individuals, and 12.8% had someone living alone who was 65 years of age or older. The average household size was 2.68 and the average family size was 3.11.

28.9% of the population were under the age of 18, 9.2% from 18 to 24, 27.8% from 25 to 44, 19.7% from 45 to 64, and 14.4% who were 65 years of age or older. The median age was 34 years. For every 100 females, there were 93.9 males. For every 100 females age 18 and over, there were 83.7 males.

The median household income was $40,050 and the median family income was $46,324. Males had a median income of $33,459 and females $22,288. The per capita income was $16,557. About 7.4% of families and 9.7% of the population were below the poverty line, including 14.4% of those under age 18 and 6.8% of those age 65 or over.

== Education ==
The community is served by Morenci Area Schools. The Morenci Area High School Bulldogs are members of the Tri-County Conference.

== Transportation ==
- M-156

== Notable people ==
- Tony Scheffler, former tight end for the Detroit Lions
- Edward D. Stair, former editor of the Detroit Free Press. Edward D. Stair was born in Morenci March 29, 1859, the son of the first white settler born in Morenci. When he was 14 years old, Stair and his 16-year-old brother started a newspaper, The Morenci Weekly Review, that competed with the existing town paper, the Morenci Observer. He later published newspapers in several Michigan communities and he acquired his first Detroit newspaper, The Journal, in 1901. Five years later he bought the Detroit Free Press which grew considerably during his reign as publisher. He took over ownership of the Howell Opera House and in 1892 he became the manager of the Whitney Theatre in Detroit. Stair later had success with several stage productions in New York City including “The Wizard of Oz.” He continued ownership of the Cass and Lafayette theatres in Detroit even after moving back into the newspaper business at the turn of the century. Stair kept in contact with his home town where he built Stair Auditorium and gave money for Stair Public Library, Stair Gymnasium and various other causes.

== Climate ==
This climatic region is typified by large seasonal temperature differences, with warm to hot (and often humid) summers and cold (sometimes severely cold) winters. According to the Köppen Climate Classification system, Morenci has a humid continental climate, abbreviated "Dfb" on climate maps.

== Gallery ==
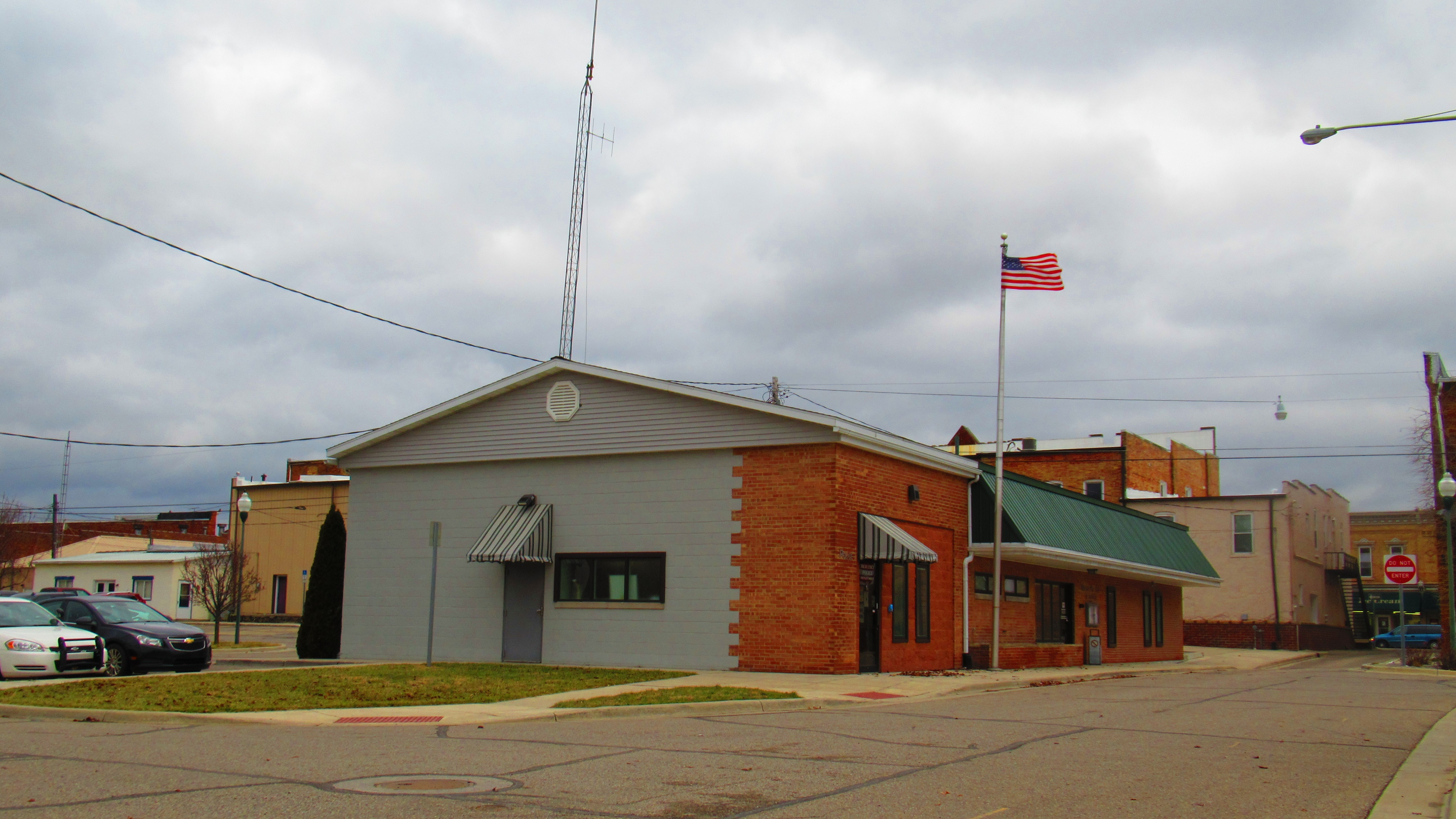
Morenci City Hall

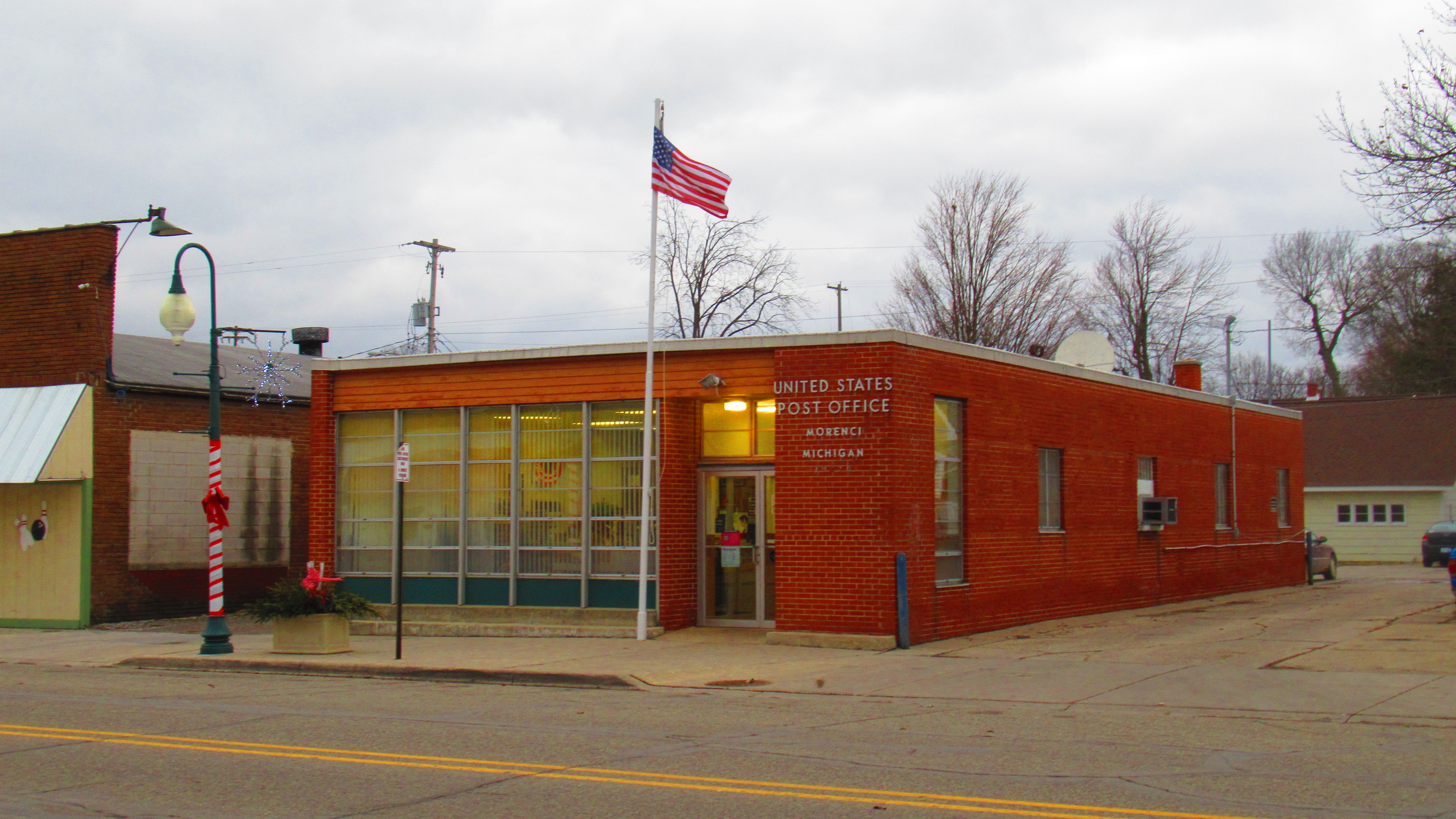
Morenci Post Office
