= Tri-County Conference (Michigan) =

MHSAA athletic league

The Tri-County Conference (TCC) is an MHSAA athletic league currently located in Lenawee and Monroe Counties.

== Member schools ==
=== Current members ===
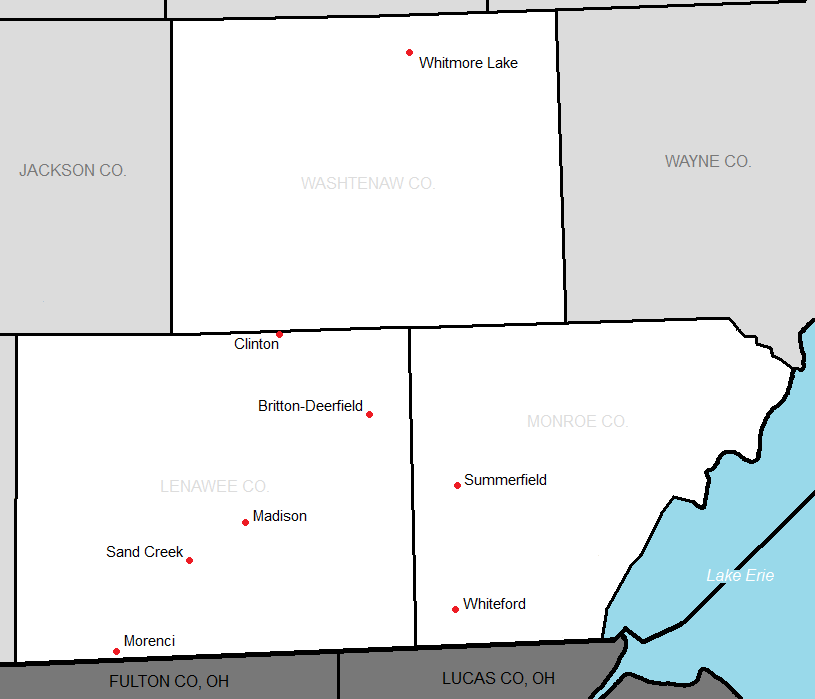
Locations of the members of the Tri-County Conference from 2011-2019.

The following schools are currently members:

School	Nickname	Location	Class	Enrollment	Colors	Joined	Previous Conference
Adrian Lenawee Christian (Note: Britton Deerfield, Lenawee Christian, and Morenci participate in 8-man football as members of the Southern Central Athletic Association.)	Cougars	Adrian	D	113		2023	Independent
Britton Deerfield	Patriots	Britton	D	125		2011	None (school opened)
Erie Mason (Note: Erie Mason, Sand Creek, Summerfield, and Whiteford are members of the football-only Great Lakes Conference.)	Eagles	Erie Township	C	363		2020	Lenawee County Athletic Association
Morenci	Bulldogs	Morenci	D	138		1981	Lenawee County Athletic Association
Ottawa Lake Whiteford	Bobcats	Whiteford Township	C	262		1975	Michigan-Ohio Border Conference
Petersburg Summerfield	Bulldogs	Summerfield Township	D	162		1973	River Raisin Conference
Sand Creek	Aggies	Madison Township	C	237		1975	Lenawee County Athletic Association

=== Former members ===
School	Nickname	Location	Joined	Previous Conference	Departed	Successive Conference
Ann Arbor Father Gabriel Richard	Fighting Irish	Ann Arbor Township	1973	Catholic High School League	1976	Independent
Britton-Macon	Tories	Britton	1973	River Raisin Conference	2011	None (school consolidated)
Deerfield	Minutemen	Deerfield	1973	River Raisin Conference	2011	None (school consolidated)
Whitmore Lake	Trojans	Northfield Township	1973	Independent	2019	Michigan Independent Athletic Conference
Clinton	Redskins	Clinton	2007	Lenawee County Athletic Association	2020	Lenawee County Athletic Association
Adrian Madison	Trojans	Madison Township	1973	River Raisin Conference	2023	Lenawee County Athletic Association
Pittsford (Note: Pittsford was an associate-member participating in football, bowling, and wrestling, which were not sponsored by the SCAA.)	Wildcats	Pittsford Township	2020	Southern Central Athletic Association	2023	Southern Central Athletic Association

== History ==
The league began with the 1973-74 sports season. The charter members were Britton-Macon, Deerfield, and Madison in Lenawee Country, St. Thomas (Now Father Gabriel Richard) and Whitmore Lake in Washtenaw County, and Summerfield in Monroe County. Whiteford would leave the Michigan-Ohio Border Conference and Sand Creek would leave the Lenawee County Athletic Association (LCAA) to join the TCC beginning in the 1975-76 sports season, while St. Thomas would depart to be an independent at the conclusion of the season. Morenci would leave the LCAA and join the conference in 1981. In 2007, Clinton would also leave the LCAA to join the conference. This would give the TCC 9 member schools at one time.

Britton-Macon and Deerfield combined all sports starting with the 2009-10 sports season, although they already were combining some sports for several years. Their districts combined on July 1, 2011 into the Britton Deerfield School District.

In 2018, Whitmore Lake elected to leave the conference in favor of joining the Michigan Independent Athletic Conference for the 2019-2020 season. However, Erie Mason was invited to join the TCC in its place beginning in the 2020-21 athletic year.

In 2019, Clinton announced it would depart the conference and return to LCAA beginning in the 2020-21 athletic year. To take their place, Pittsford announced they would join the league as an associate member in football, wrestling, and bowling. This move came as a result of every other member of the Southern Central Athletic Association (SCAA) moving to 8-man football. Pittsford would remain in the SCAA for all other sports.

In 2020, Britton Deerfield announced that they would be dropping down to 8-man football, due a lack of numbers in the program. In 2021, they would form the Tri-River 8 Conference, an 8-man football only conference, along with 4 other schools.

After the conclusion of the 2021 football season, both Morenci and Pittsford announced they would be transitioning to 8-man football for the 2022 season, both due to a lack of numbers within their respective programs. Morenci will join the Tri-River 8 Conference and Pittsford will return to the SCAA's 8-man conference in 2022, remaining a TCC member in bowling only.

On June 27, 2022 the Madison board of education voted to leave the conference after the 2022-23 school year to join the Lenawee County Athletic Association. Concurrently, the league began discussions with Ohio's Toledo Area Athletic Conference (TAAC) about a possible merger. Following the announcement of Madison's departure, Lenawee Christian would apply for membership and would be accepted into the conference, beginning with the 2023-24 school year.

At the conclusion of the 2023 football regular season, Sand Creek announced their intention to join the Big "8" Conference as a football-only member beginning in 2024, remaining in the TCC for all other sports. Following this announcement, Erie Mason and Whiteford agreed to a football scheduling alliance with the Lenawee County Athletic Association beginning with the 2025 season, making 2024 the last season of TCC football.

In October 2024 it was announced that Erie Mason, Summerfield, and Whiteford would join the TAAC as football-only members starting in 2025, and that the scheduling alliance between Erie Mason, Whiteford, and the LCAA would be abandoned. This would only last for one season, as in October 2025 the three schools, along with the four Ohio schools from the TAAC, and Sand Creek announced they would create the football-only Great Lakes Conference starting in 2026.

== Championships ==
These lists go through Fall of the 2025-26 school year.

=== Boys Champions ===
School Year	Football	Cross Country	Basketball	Wrestling	Bowling	Baseball	Track & Field	Golf
1973-74	St. Thomas, Deerfield		St. Thomas			Deerfield	St. Thomas	
1974-75	Britton		St. Thomas			Britton	St. Thomas	
1975-76	St. Thomas		St. Thomas			Summerfield	St. Thomas	
1976-77	Britton		Deerfield			Summerfield, Whiteford	Summerfield	
1977-78	Sand Creek		Adrian Madison			Adrian Madison, Summerfield	Sand Creek, Summerfield	
1978-79	Summerfield		Adrian Madison			Summerfield	Summerfield	
1979-80	Britton, Deerfield		Britton, Whiteford			Summerfield	Summerfield	
1980-81	Summerfield		Adrian Madison			Summerfield	Summerfield	
1981-82	Britton, Summerfield		Whiteford			Britton, Whitmore Lake	Summerfield, Whitmore Lake	
1982-83	Morenci, Summerfield		Whiteford			Britton, Deerfield	Summerfield	
1983-84	Morenci		Morenci			Morenci	Summerfield	
1984-85	Sand Creek		Morenci, Sand Creek			Morenci	Sand Creek	
1985-86	Sand Creek		Adrian Madison, Morenci			Summerfield	Sand Creek	
1986-87	Morenci, Summerfield, Whitmore Lake		Morenci, Whiteford			Summerfield	Summerfield	
1987-88	Sand Creek		Whiteford			Morenci	Summerfield	
1988-89	Sand Creek		Whiteford			Morenci	Whitmore Lake	
1989-90	Summerfield		Sand Creek			Summerfield	Whitmore Lake	
1990-91	Morenci		Sand Creek			Summerfield, Whiteford	Sand Creek, Whitmore Lake	
1991-92	Sand Creek		Sand Creek			Summerfield	Sand Creek	
1992-93	Sand Creek		Sand Creek			Sand Creek	Sand Creek	
1993-94	Sand Creek		Sand Creek			Whiteford	Sand Creek	
1994-95	Sand Creek, Whiteford		Summerfield			Sand Creek, Summerfield	Sand Creek	
1995-96	Morenci		Sand Creek			Summerfield	Sand Creek	
1996-97	Morenci		Deerfield, Sand Creek			Summerfield	Sand Creek, Whitmore Lake	
1997-98	Morenci		Britton			Britton-Deerfield, Whiteford	Sand Creek, Summerfield	
1998-99	Britton-Deerfield		Britton			Whiteford	Sand Creek	
1999-00	Britton-Deerfield		Britton			Whitmore Lake	Sand Creek	Sand Creek
2000-01	Britton-Deerfield		Adrian Madison			Whiteford	Adrian Madison	Summerfield
2001-02	Morenci		Morenci			Summerfield	Sand Creek, Whiteford	Britton-Deerfield, Whiteford
2002-03	Whitmore Lake	Morenci	Whiteford			Sand Creek	Adrian Madison	Whiteford
2003-04	Morenci	Morenci	Whitmore Lake			Britton-Deerfield	Whiteford	Summerfield
2004-05	Sand Creek	Sand Creek, Whitmore Lake	Whitmore Lake			Whiteford	Adrian Madison	Summerfield
2005-06	Sand Creek	Morenci	Morenci			Whiteford	Whiteford	Summerfield
2006-07	Sand Creek	Whitmore Lake	Morenci			Adrian Madison, Summerfield	Whiteford	Summerfield
2007-08	Clinton, Sand Creek	Whitmore Lake	Adrian Madison			Clinton, Sand Creek, Summerfield, Whiteford	Adrian Madison	Summerfield
2008-09	Sand Creek	Whitmore Lake	Summerfield			Clinton	Sand Creek	Adrian Madison
2009-10	Clinton	Whitmore Lake	Clinton			Clinton	Sand Creek, Whitmore Lake	Adrian Madison
2010-11	Summerfield	Whitmore Lake	Clinton			Summerfield	Sand Creek	Adrian Madison, Whitmore Lake
2011-12	Sand Creek	Clinton	Summerfield, Whiteford			Clinton	Adrian Madison, Sand Creek	Whitmore Lake
2012-13	Clinton	Clinton	Adrian Madison, Clinton			Britton Deerfield	Clinton, Summerfield	Clinton
2013-14	Clinton	Adrian Madison	Adrian Madison			Clinton	Adrian Madison	Adrian Madison
2014-15	Clinton	Adrian Madison	Morenci			Whiteford	Adrian Madison	Clinton
2015-16	Clinton	Sand Creek	Adrian Madison			Whiteford	Adrian Madison	Adrian Madison
2016-17	Whiteford	Whitmore Lake	Sand Creek			Whiteford	Adrian Madison	Clinton
2017-18	Whiteford	Sand Creek	Whiteford			Whiteford	Adrian Madison	Clinton
2018-19	Whiteford	Whitmore Lake	Summerfield			Summerfield	Adrian Madison	Clinton
2019-20	Clinton	Clinton	Summerfield			(None)	(None)	(None)
2020-21	Erie Mason	Erie Mason	Erie Mason	Adrian Madison	Adrian Madison	Erie Mason	Erie Mason	Adrian Madison
2021-22	Whiteford	Erie Mason	Erie Mason	Adrian Madison	Adrian Madison	Whiteford	Erie Mason	Adrian Madison
2022-23	Whiteford	Erie Mason	Erie Mason	Adrian Madison	Britton Deerfield	Adrian Madison, Whiteford	Erie Mason, Whiteford	Adrian Madison
2023-24	Whiteford	Erie Mason	Lenawee Christian	(Discontinued)	Britton Deerfield	Whiteford	Erie Mason, Whiteford	Lenawee Christian
2024-25	Summerfield	Erie Mason	Lenawee Christian, Summerfield		Britton Deerfield	Whiteford	Erie Mason	Summerfield
2025-26	(Discontinued)	Erie Mason						

=== Girls Champions ===
School Year	Volleyball	Cross Country	Basketball	Bowling	Softball	Track & Field
1973-74	St. Thomas		St. Thomas		St. Thomas	
1974-75	Summerfield		St. Thomas		Whitmore Lake	
1975-76	St.Thomas, Whiteford, Whitmore Lake		Sand Creek		Whitmore Lake	
1976-77	Whiteford		Whitmore Lake		Whitmore Lake	
1977-78	Whiteford		Whitmore Lake		Britton	
1978-79	Whiteford		Whiteford		Whiteford	
1979-80	Summerfield		Whiteford, Whitmore Lake		Whiteford	
1980-81	Summerfield, Whiteford		Britton		Whiteford	
1981-82	Whiteford		Adrian Madison, Whiteford		Morenci, Summerfield	
1982-83	Morenci		Adrian Madison		Morenci	
1983-84	Whiteford		Whiteford		Summerfield	
1984-85	Whiteford		Whiteford		Morenci	Whitmore Lake
1985-86	Whiteford		Morenci		Morenci	Sand Creek
1986-87	Morenci		Morenci		Morenci, Whiteford	Sand Creek
1987-88	Morenci		Morenci		Morenci, Summerfield	Sand Creek
1988-89	Morenci		Morenci		Whiteford	Morenci, Sand Creek
1989-90	Adrian Madison, Morenci		Whiteford		Whitmore Lake	Summerfield
1990-91	Morenci, Whiteford		Whiteford		Whiteford	Morenci
1991-92	Summerfield		Deerfield		Whitmore Lake	Sand Creek
1992-93	Sand Creek		Deerfield, Whiteford		Whiteford	Morenci, Sand Creek
1993-94	Whiteford		Deerfield, Sand Creek		Whiteford	Sand Creek
1994-95	Sand Creek		Deerfield, Sand Creek		Whiteford	Sand Creek
1995-96	Sand Creek, Whiteford		Britton		Whiteford	Whitmore Lake
1996-97	Whiteford		Britton		Summerfield	Whitmore Lake
1997-98	Sand Creek		Britton		Sand Creek	Sand Creek
1998-99	Sand Creek		Sand Creek		Summerfield	Sand Creek
1999-00	Whiteford		Sand Creek		Summerfield	Morenci, Sand Creek
2000-01	Whiteford		Britton, Whiteford		Summerfield	Morenci
2001-02	Whiteford		Britton, Morenci		Summerfield	Morenci
2002-03	Whiteford	Morenci	Morenci		Morenci	Sand Creek
2003-04	Whiteford	Morenci	Morenci		Summerfield	Sand Creek
2004-05	Adrian Madison	Whiteford	Morenci		Morenci	Sand Creek
2005-06	Whiteford	Whiteford	Sand Creek		Summerfield	Sand Creek
2006-07	Whiteford	Whiteford	Summerfield		Sand Creek	Adrian Madison
2007-08	Clinton	Whitmore Lake	Clinton		Clinton	Adrian Madison
2008-09	Whitmore Lake	Whitmore Lake	Sand Creek		Clinton	Adrian Madison
2009-10	Clinton	Adrian Madison	Clinton		Clinton	Adrian Madison
2010-11	Adrian Madison	Whiteford	Sand Creek		Clinton	Adrian Madison
2011-12	Adrian Madison	Clinton	Adrian Madison		Clinton	Adrian Madison
2012-13	Whiteford	Britton Deerfield	Adrian Madison		Clinton	Adrian Madison, Sand Creek
2013-14	Whiteford	Adrian Madison	Adrian Madison		Clinton	Adrian Madison
2014-15	Whiteford	Adrian Madison	Adrian Madison		Clinton	Adrian Madison
2015-16	Clinton	Sand Creek	Adrian Madison		Clinton	Adrian Madison
2016-17	Adrian Madison	Adrian Madison	Adrian Madison		Whiteford	Adrian Madison
2017-18	Adrian Madison	Sand Creek	Morenci		Clinton	Adrian Madison
2018-19	Adrian Madison	Sand Creek	Adrian Madison		Whiteford	Adrian Madison
2019-20	Adrian Madison	Clinton	Adrian Madison, Sand Creek		(None)	(None)
2020-21	Adrian Madison	Morenci	Erie Mason	Sand Creek	Whiteford	Adrian Madison
2021-22	Adrian Madison	Sand Creek	Erie Mason	Pittsford	Whiteford	Adrian Madison
2022-23	Adrian Madison	Sand Creek	Morenci, Summerfield	Adrian Madison	Whiteford	Adrian Madison, Erie Mason, Whiteford
2023-24	Lenawee Christian	Erie Mason	Morenci	(Discontinued)	Whiteford	Erie Mason
2024-25	Erie Mason	Erie Mason	Morenci		Whiteford	Erie Mason
2025-26	Lenawee Christian, Whiteford	Summerfield				
