= Britton-Macon Area School District =

School district in Michigan, United States

Address
- 201 College Avenue Britton, Michigan, 49229; United States
- Coordinates: 41°59′09.0″N 83°50′04.3″W

District information
- Type: Public
- Established: ~1910
- Dissolved: July 1, 2011
- Enrollment: ~500

Other information
- Mascot Colors: Tory; Red and White

The Britton-Macon Area School District, often shortened to Britton Schools, was in Lenawee County, Michigan and covered the area of Ridgeway and Macon Townships, though not exclusively.

It had one building in Britton, Michigan which handled a majority of the classes of the 500 or so Kindergarten through 12th Grade students.

Some 11th and 12th grade students also attended classes at Lenawee VO-TECH in Adrian, Michigan.

It cooperated with Deerfield Public Schools in some of its competitive sports programs, usually called 'BD' (Britton-Deerfield). In Sports that it did not cooperate, their team was called the 'Tories', with a Mascot of 'The Tory' (created by a student group in the 1950s, previous to that the teams were most often called 'Big Red'). Britton-Macon was a member of the Tri-County Conference.

For the 2010-2011 school year, both the Britton-Macon and Deerfield school boards voted to adopt a "shared services" plan for their middle school and high school students. All middle school students (6-8) from both districts will attend classes in Deerfield while high schoolers (9-12) will attend classes in Britton. Both school buildings will maintain their current elementary classes.

Along with the resolution, the school boards also moved to consolidate the districts. Official ballot language was finalized and placed on the ballot in both districts on August 3, 2010. The support was overwhelming and consolidation passed 697-178. The school districts officially became the Britton Deerfield School District on July 1, 2011.
