= Britton Deerfield School District =

School district in Michigan

Britton Deerfield Schools

Address
- 252 Deerfield Road Deerfield, Michigan, 49238; United States

District information
- Type: Public
- Established: July 1, 2011; 15 years ago
- NCES District ID: 2606930

Students and staff
- Enrollment: 453 (2020-2021)
- Student–teacher ratio: 15.41
- District mascot: Patriots
- Colors: Red, White, & Blue

Other information
- Website: www.bdschools.us

Britton Deerfield High School

Location
- 201 College Avenue; Britton, Michigan 49229; United States

Information
- Type: Public
- Established: 2011
- Colors: Red, White, & Blue
- Athletics conference: Tri-County Conference
- Mascot: Patriots
- Website: http://www.bdschools.us/

The Britton Deerfield School District is located within Lenawee County, Michigan and part of Monroe County. It covers most of Deerfield, Macon, and Ridgeway townships in Lenawee County, and parts of Dundee, Milan, and Summerfield townships in Monroe County.

== History ==
The district was created on July 1, 2011, when the Britton-Macon Area School District merged with the Deerfield Public School district.

For the 2010–11 school year, both school boards voted to adopt a "shared service" plan for their middle and high school students. All high school students (grades 9–12) would attend classes in the Britton building, while all middle school students (grades 6–8) would attend classes in the Deerfield building. Both towns would continue to use their elementary schools for grades Pre-K-5). The school boards would ultimately decide to merge in time for the 2011–12 school year.

== Athletics ==
The two districts had operated separately as the Britton Tories and the Deerfield Minutemen, but would occasionally combine their athletic teams in order to compete. Britton and Deerfield would ultimately combine all of their sports teams beginning with the 2009–10 school year as the Britton Deerfield Patriots, which was a salute to both schools' American Revolutionary War nicknames. They compete in the Tri-County Conference and wear the colors of red, white, and blue.

Both Britton and Deerfield competed in the River Raisin Conference from 1960 to 1973 and have been in the Tri-County Conference ever since.

=== River Raisin Conference championships ===
- Football
  - Deerfield: 1962

=== Tri-County Conference championships ===
- Basketball
  - Britton: 1979-80*, 1997–98, 1998–99, 1999-00
  - Deerfield: 1976–77, 1996-97*

Note: An asterisk (*) denotes shared titles
