= Deerfield Public Schools =

School district in Michigan, United States

Address
- 252 Deerfield Road Deerfield, Michigan, 49238; United States
- Coordinates: 41°53′23.0″N 83°46′59.2″W

District information
- Type: Public
- Dissolved: July 1, 2011

Students and staff
- Enrollment: 330
- District mascot: Minutemen
- Colors: Blue, White, Red

Other information
- Website: deerfieldpublicschools.org

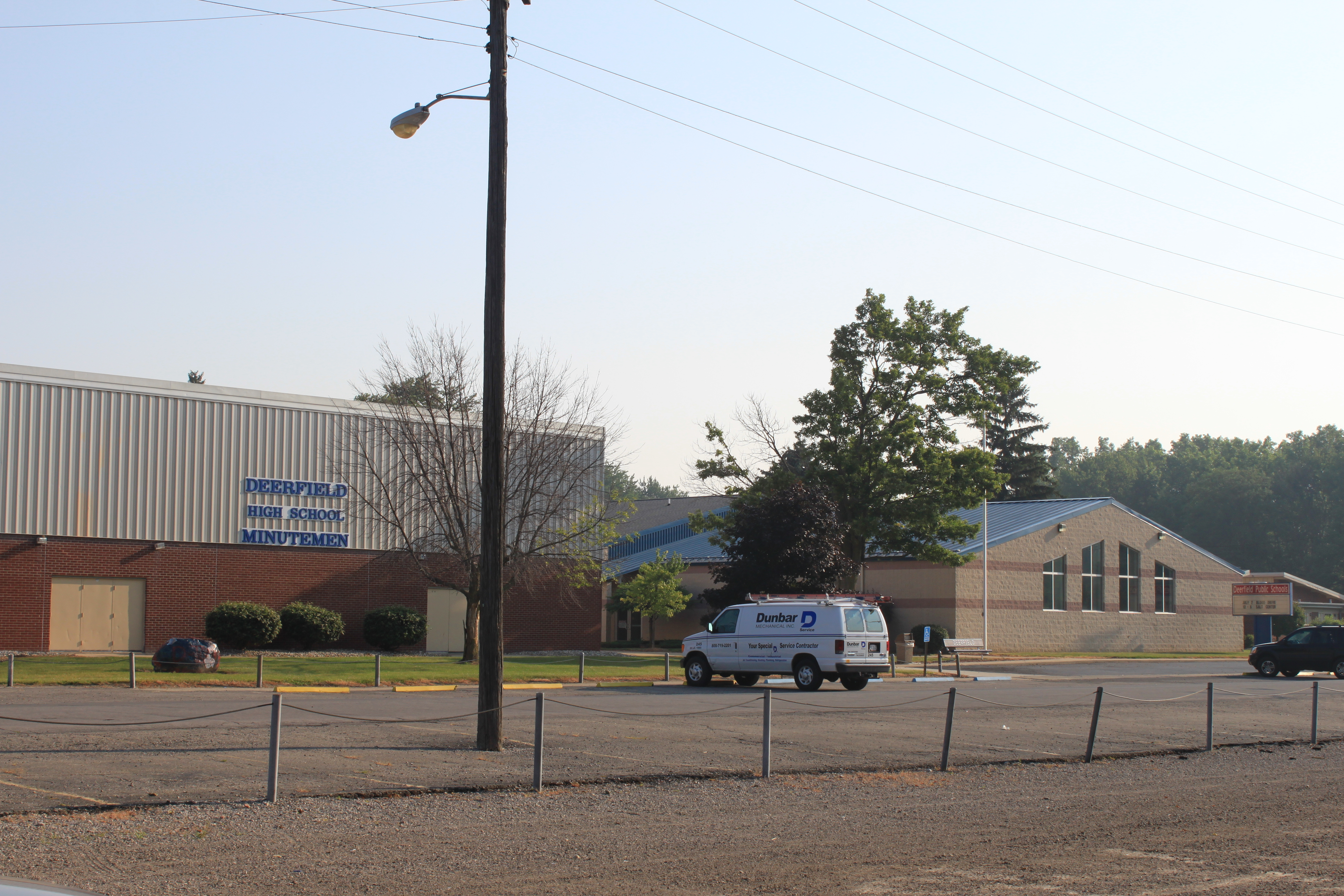
Deerfield schools, Deerfield Hwy.

The Deerfield Public School District, was a public school district in Lenawee County, Michigan and covered the area of Deerfield Township, as well as some surrounding areas. It merged with Britton Macon Area schools to form the Britton Deerfield School District in 2011. The two schools had already merged sports teams.

It had one building in Deerfield, Michigan which handled a majority of the classes from Kindergarten through 12th Grade. The school now serves as the middle school for the merged Britton-Deerfield district.

Some 11th and 12th grade students also attended classes at the LISD TECH Center in Adrian, Michigan.

== Sports ==
Deerfield athletes participated in the Tri-County Conference which includes teams from Lenawee, Monroe, and Washtenaw counties. Teams in this conference are from Clinton, Adrian Madison, Morenci, Sand Creek, Summerfield, Whiteford, and Whitmore Lake, as well as from Britton and Deerfield. As of the 2009–2010 school year all athletics were combined with Britton. When these two schools combine teams, they are known as the Britton Deerfield Patriots or BD Patriots.

DPS officially merged with Britton on July 1, 2011, to become the Britton Deerfield School District.

Sports Programs
Fall:
Football
Volleyball
Cross Country
Winter
Boys & Girls Basketball
Spring
Baseball
Softball
Track & Field
Golf
