= Sand Creek High School (Michigan) =

Public school in Michigan, US

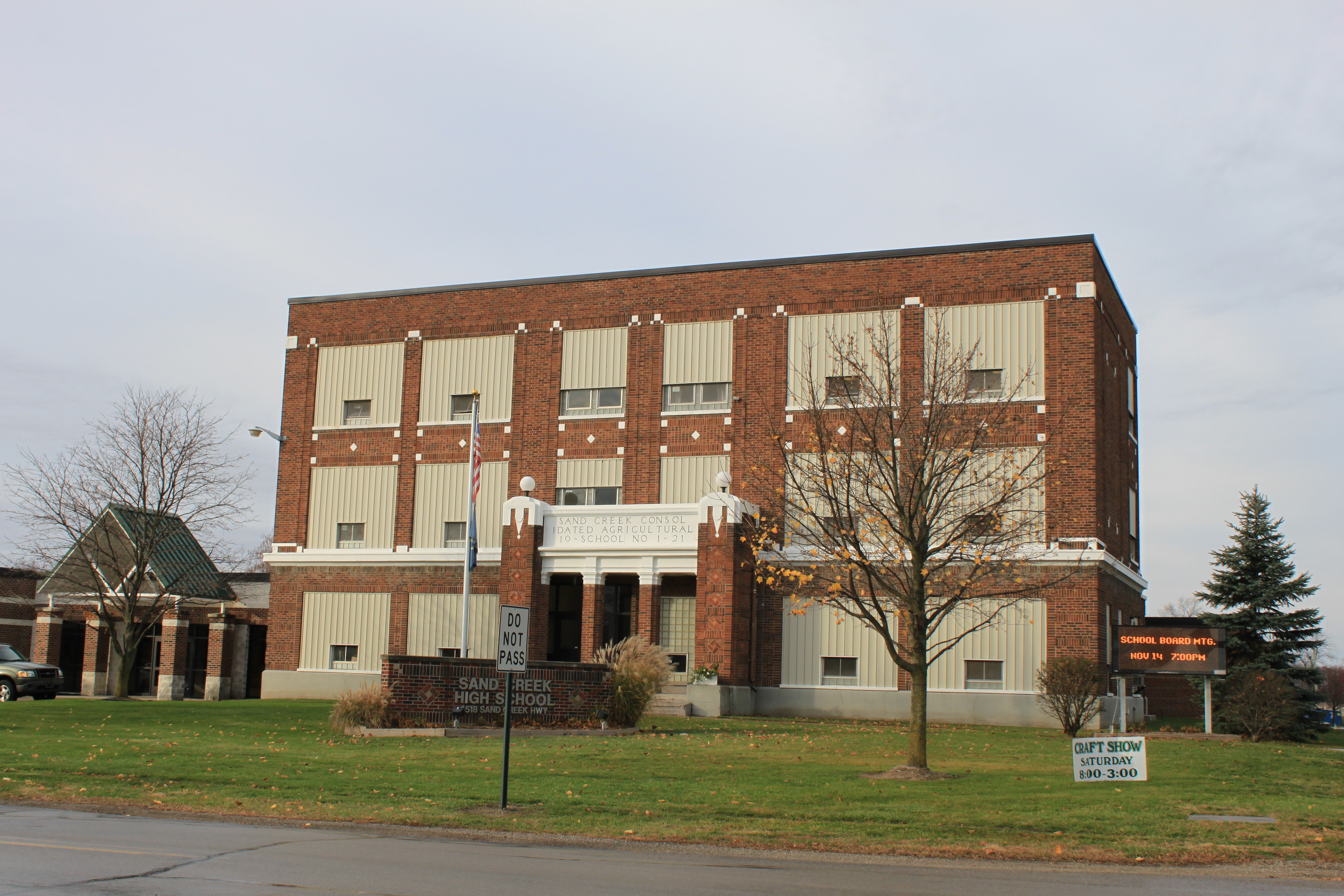
- Sand Creek Community Schools

Location
- 6518 Sand Creek Highway; Sand Creek, Michigan 49279; United States; 41°49′19″N 84°06′07″W

Information
- School type: Public
- Established: 1921
- School district: Sand Creek Community Schools
- NCES School ID: 263078006711
- Principal: John Peacock
- Faculty: 25.30 (on an FTE basis)
- Grades: 6–12
- Enrollment: 404 (2024–25)
- Student to teacher ratio: 15.97
- Colors: Green and white
- Athletics conference: Tri-County Conference (Primary); Great Lakes Conference (football only)
- Team name: Aggies
- Website: www.sc-aggies.us

Sand Creek High School is a public junior/senior high school located in Madison Charter Township, Lenawee County, Michigan. It is the only high school of the Sand Creek Community Schools. Athletic teams are known as the Aggies, and they compete in Michigan High School Athletic Association as a member of the Tri-County Conference. The football team competes in the Great Lakes Conference along with three other schools from the Tri-County Conference, and four schools from Ohio.

== History ==
Sand Creek High School was formed in 1921, with the consolidation of several smaller one-room schools. It was later combined into a junior senior high school.

Sand Creek Community Schools proposed a $15.1 million bond in 2023 to improve the campus and repair safety issues within the school districts buildings. The bond was denied, with 71% voting to deny the bond.

== Athletics ==
Sand Creek High School currently offers:

- Baseball
- Basketball
- Bowling
- Cheerleading
- Cross Country
- Football
- Golf
- Softball
- Track and field
- Volleyball

== Notable alumni ==
- Jeff Hephner, actor
