= Sand Creek Community Schools =

School district in Michigan

Address
- 6518 Sand Creek Highway Sand Creek, Lenawee County, Michigan, 49279; United States

District information
- Grades: PreKindergarten–12
- Superintendent: Sharon Smith
- Schools: 2
- Budget: $11,835,000 2022-2023 expenditures
- NCES District ID: 2630780

Students and staff
- Students: 757 (2024-2025)
- Teachers: 47.64 (on an FTE basis) (2024-2025)
- Staff: 119.0 FTE (2024-2025)
- Student–teacher ratio: 15.89 (2024-2025)
- District mascot: Aggies

Other information
- Website: www.sc-aggies.us

Sand Creek Community Schools is a public school district in Lenawee County, Michigan. It serves parts of the townships of Dover, Fairfield, Madison, Ogden, Palmyra, and Seneca.

== History ==
Groundbreaking for Sand Creek Junior/Senior High School was on August 17, 1921. The building has been in continuous use since it opened. The school was the result of the consolidation of the small rural school districts in the area, reportedly the first district consolidation in Michigan. The building was modeled after Chesterfield High School in Oakshade, Ohio.

The district's elementary school was built around 1959. It was ultimately named for Ruth McGregor, principal of the district during the 1950s, when all grades were housed in the high school building.

== Schools ==
Schools in Sand Creek Community Schools
School	Address	Notes
Sand Creek Junior/Senior High School	6518 Sand Creek Highway, Sand Creek	Grades 6–12.
Ruth McGregor Elementary	6850 Sand Creek Highway, Sand Creek	Grades PreK-5.
