= Deerfield Township, Lenawee County, Michigan =

Deerfield Township, Michigan
- Civil township
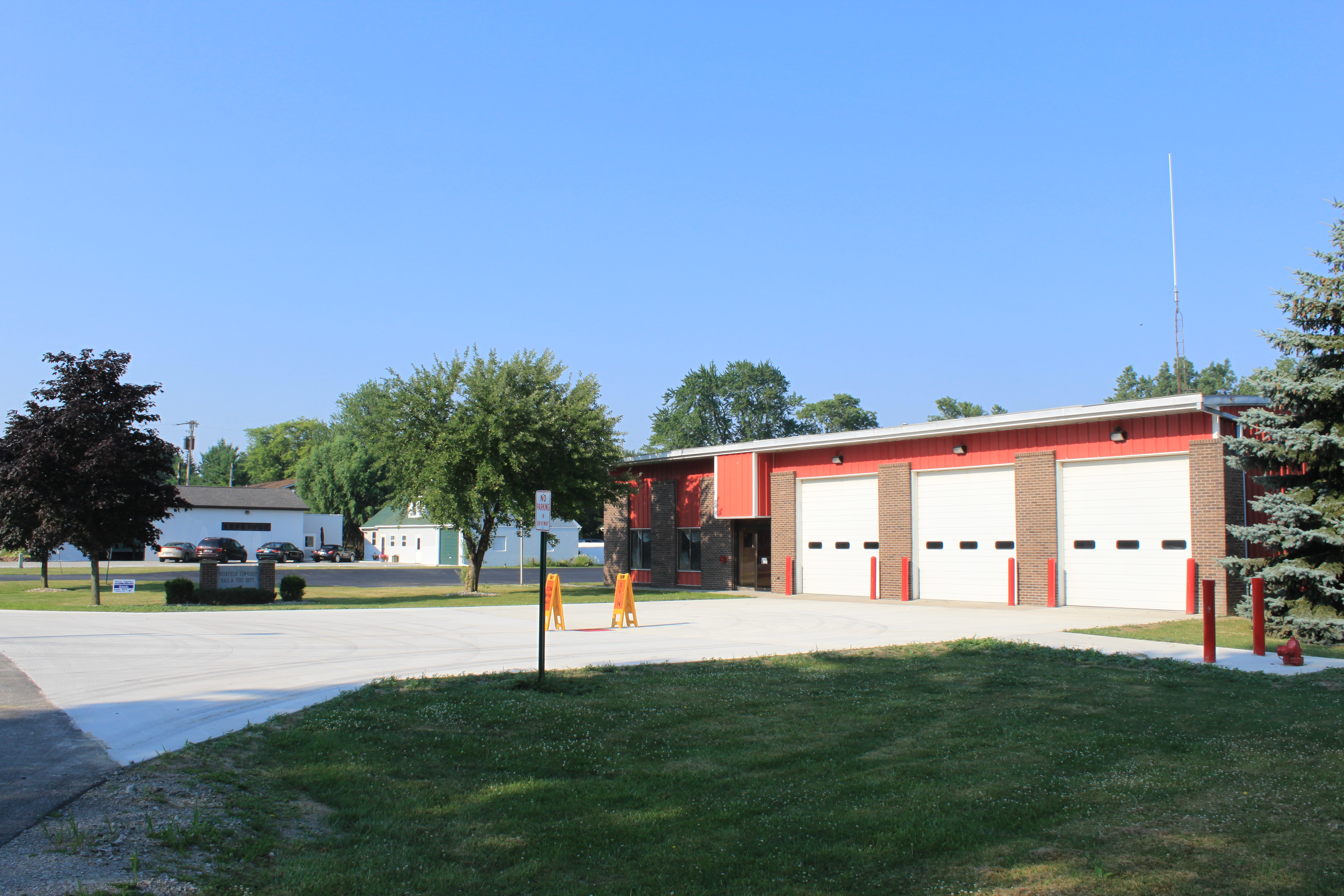
- Township Hall and Fire Department

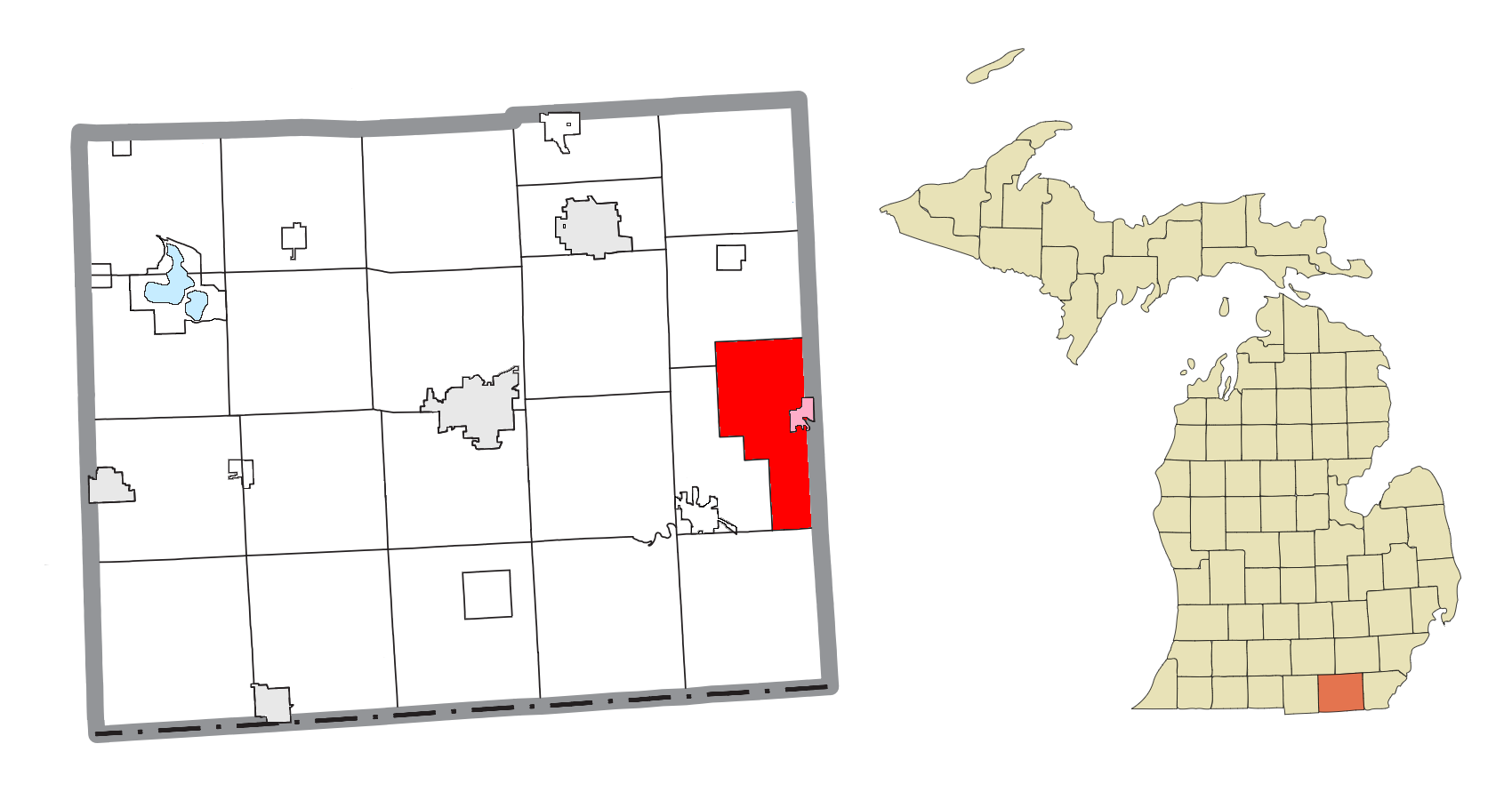
- Location within Lenawee County (red) and the administered village of Deerfield (pink)

- Location within the state of Michigan Deerfield Township (the United States)
- Coordinates: 41°52′54″N 83°48′11″W
- Country: United States
- State: Michigan
- County: Lenawee

Government
  - Supervisor: Ronald Cousino
  - Clerk: Melissa Burnor

Area
  - Total: 25.1 sq mi (65.1 km^{2})
  - Land: 25.1 sq mi (65.1 km^{2})
  - Water: 0 sq mi (0.0 km^{2})
- Elevation: 679 ft (207 m)

Population (2020)
  - Total: 1,503
  - Density: 59.8/sq mi (23.1/km^{2})
- Time zone: UTC-5 (Eastern (EST))
  - Summer (DST): UTC-4 (EDT)
- ZIP code(s): 49228 (Blissfield); 49229 (Britton); 49238 (Deerfield)
- Area code: 517
- FIPS code: 26-21200
- GNIS feature ID: 1626170
- Website: https://deerfieldtownshiplenawee.com/

Deerfield Township is a civil township of Lenawee County in the U.S. state of Michigan. The population was 1,503 at the 2020 census. The village of Deerfield is located within the township.

== Geography ==
According to the United States Census Bureau, the township has a total area of 25.1 square miles (65.1 km^{2}), all land.

== Demographics ==
As of the census of 2000, there were 1,770 people, 596 households, and 457 families residing in the township. The population density was 70.4 inhabitants per square mile (27.2/km^{2}). There were 627 housing units at an average density of 25.0 per square mile (9.7/km^{2}). The racial makeup of the township was 94.52% White, 0.40% African American, 0.11% Asian, 4.80% from other races, and 0.17% from two or more races. Hispanic or Latino of any race were 5.88% of the population.

There were 596 households, out of which 39.6% had children under the age of 18 living with them, 63.6% were married couples living together, 8.7% had a female householder with no husband present, and 23.2% were non-families. 18.1% of all households were made up of individuals, and 9.1% had someone living alone who was 65 years of age or older. The average household size was 2.84 and the average family size was 3.23.

In the township the population was spread out, with 29.7% under the age of 18, 8.5% from 18 to 24, 29.5% from 25 to 44, 21.6% from 45 to 64, and 10.7% who were 65 years of age or older. The median age was 34 years. For every 100 females, there were 95.8 males. For every 100 females age 18 and over, there were 94.8 males.

The median income for a household in the township was $50,000, and the median income for a family was $52,417. Males had a median income of $40,096 versus $24,102 for females. The per capita income for the township was $19,878. About 4.1% of families and 6.3% of the population were below the poverty line, including 5.9% of those under age 18 and 6.4% of those age 65 or over.

== Gallery ==
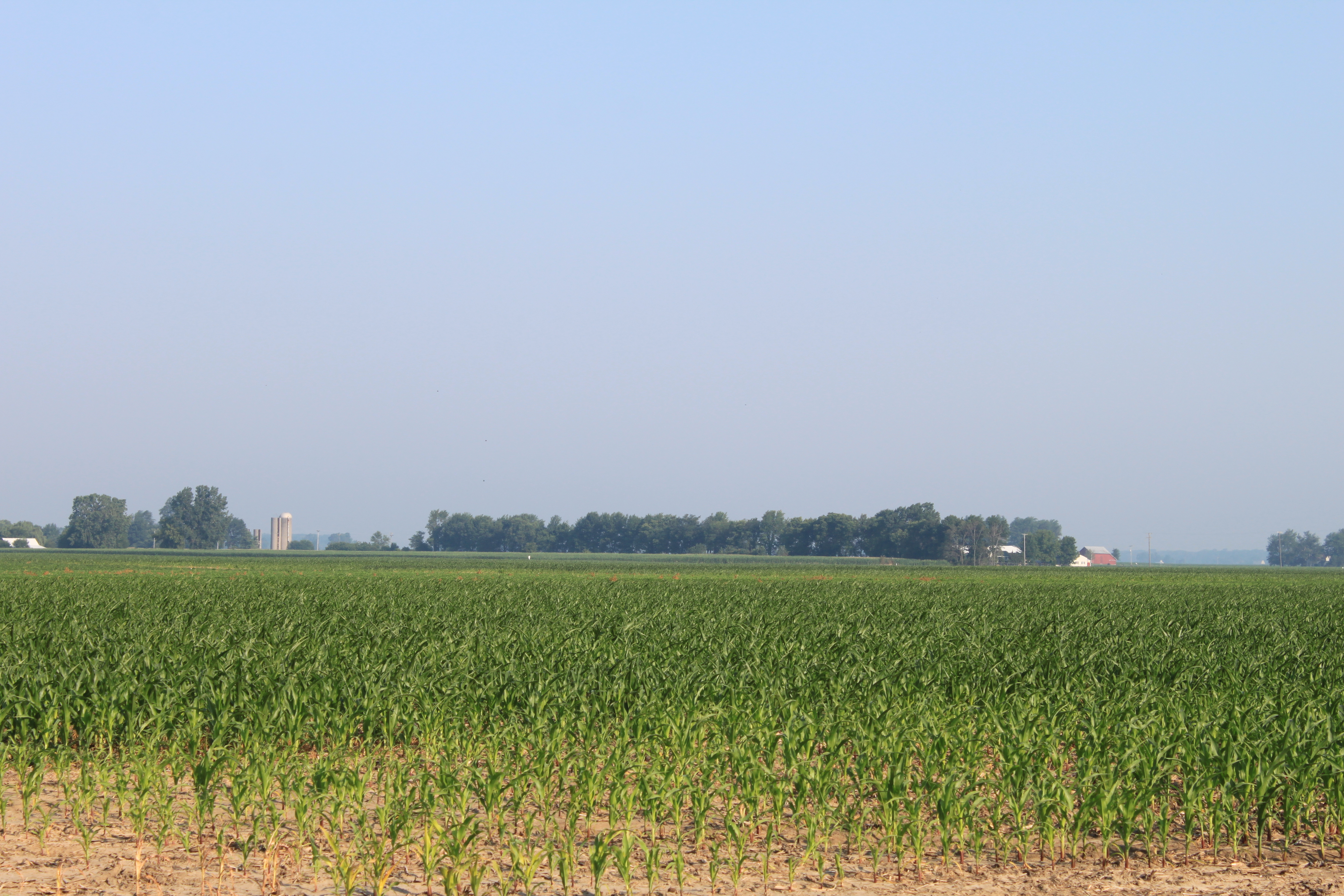
Farmland from Rouget Rd at Stearns Hwy.

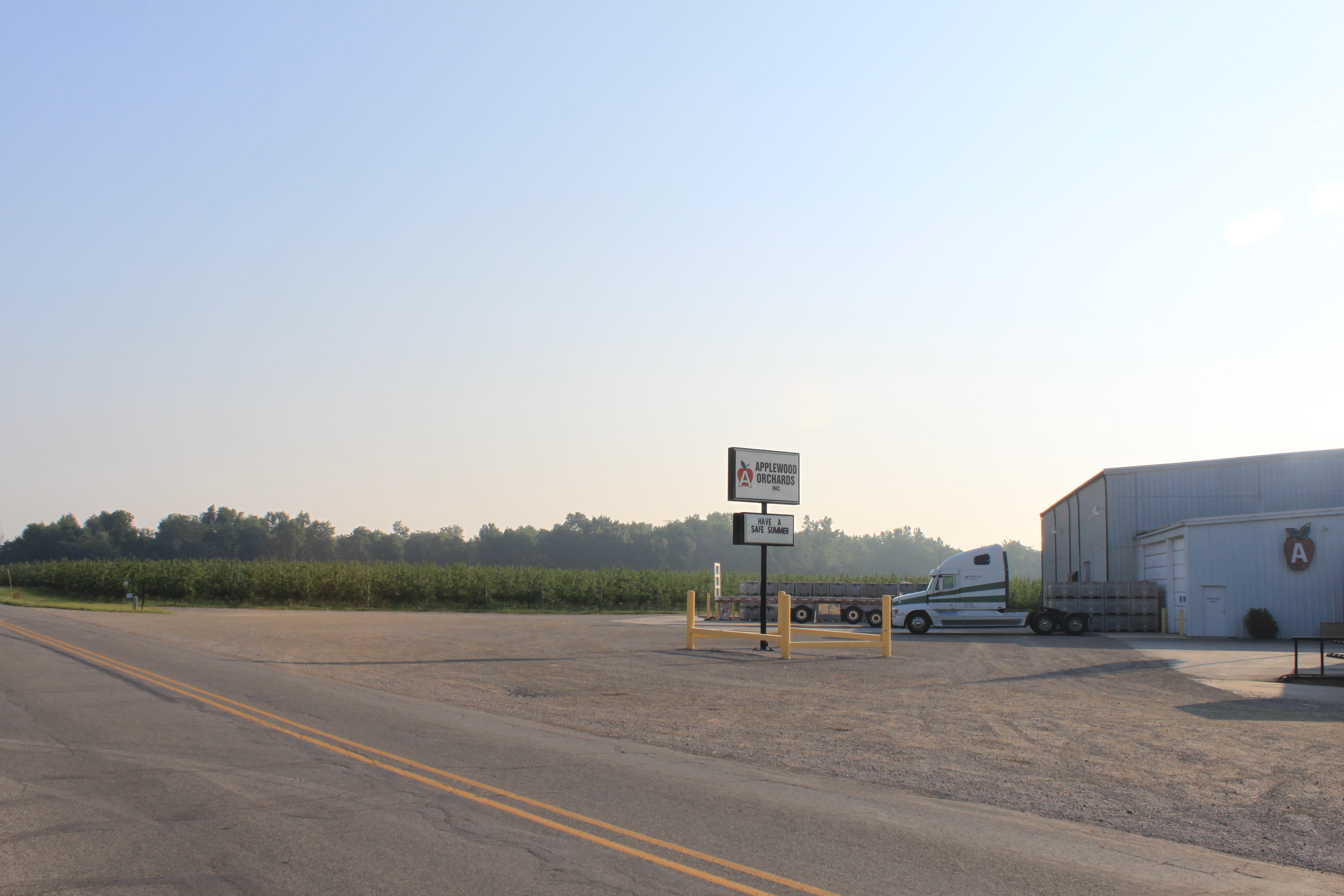
Applewood Orchards, Rodesiler Hwy.

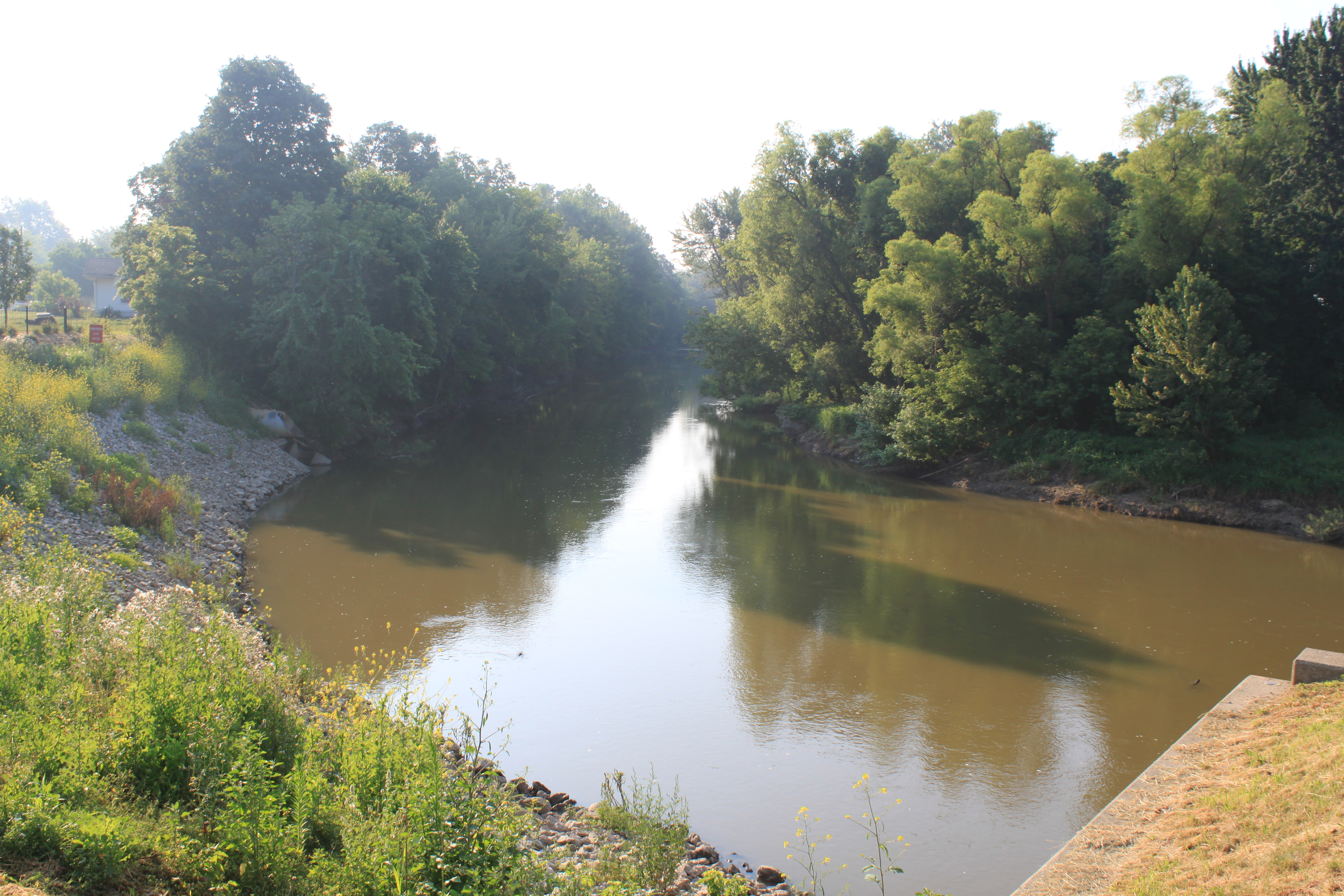
River Raisin from bridge on Rodesiler Hwy.
