= Britton, Michigan =

- Village
- Village of Britton
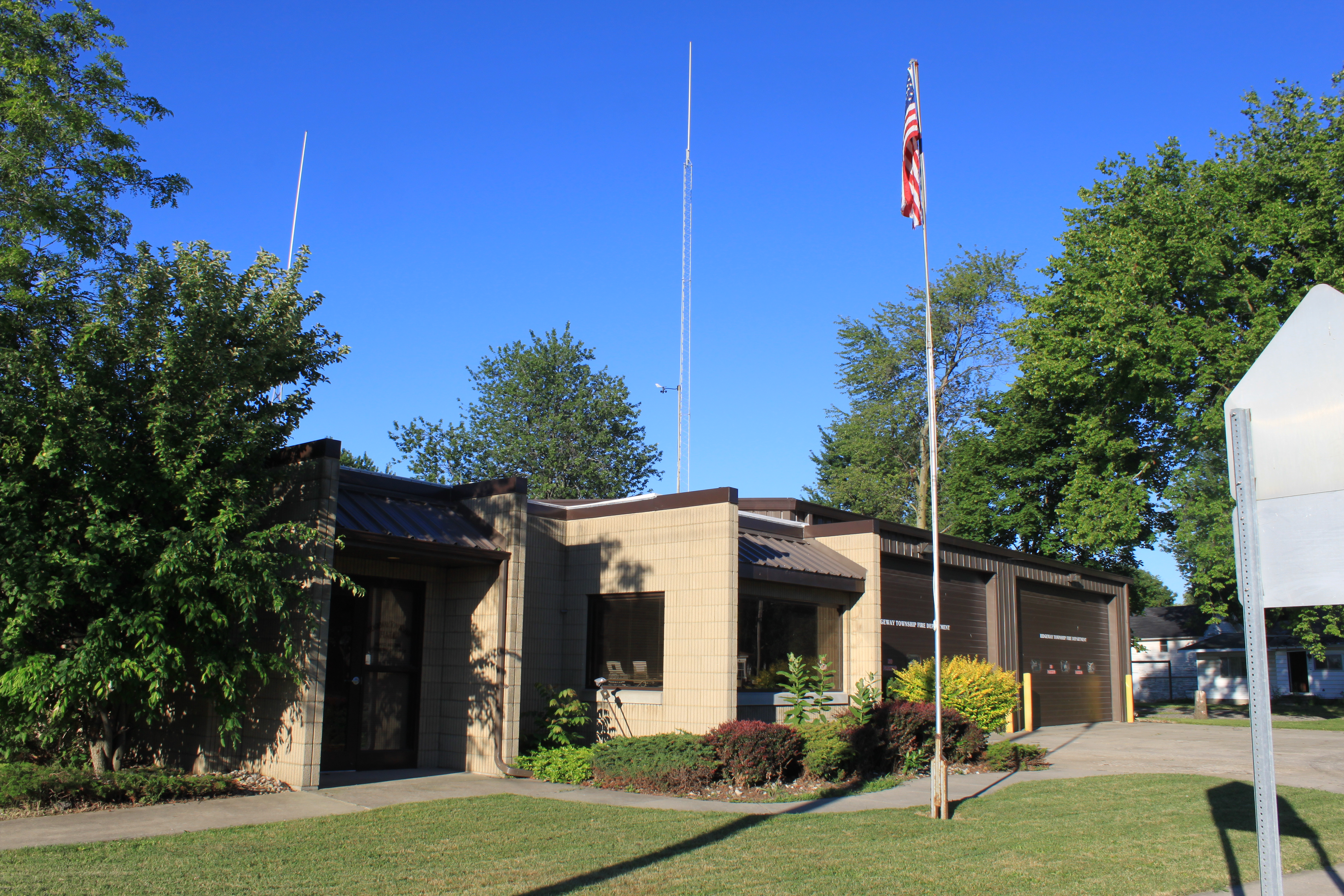
- Ridgeway Township Hall in Britton

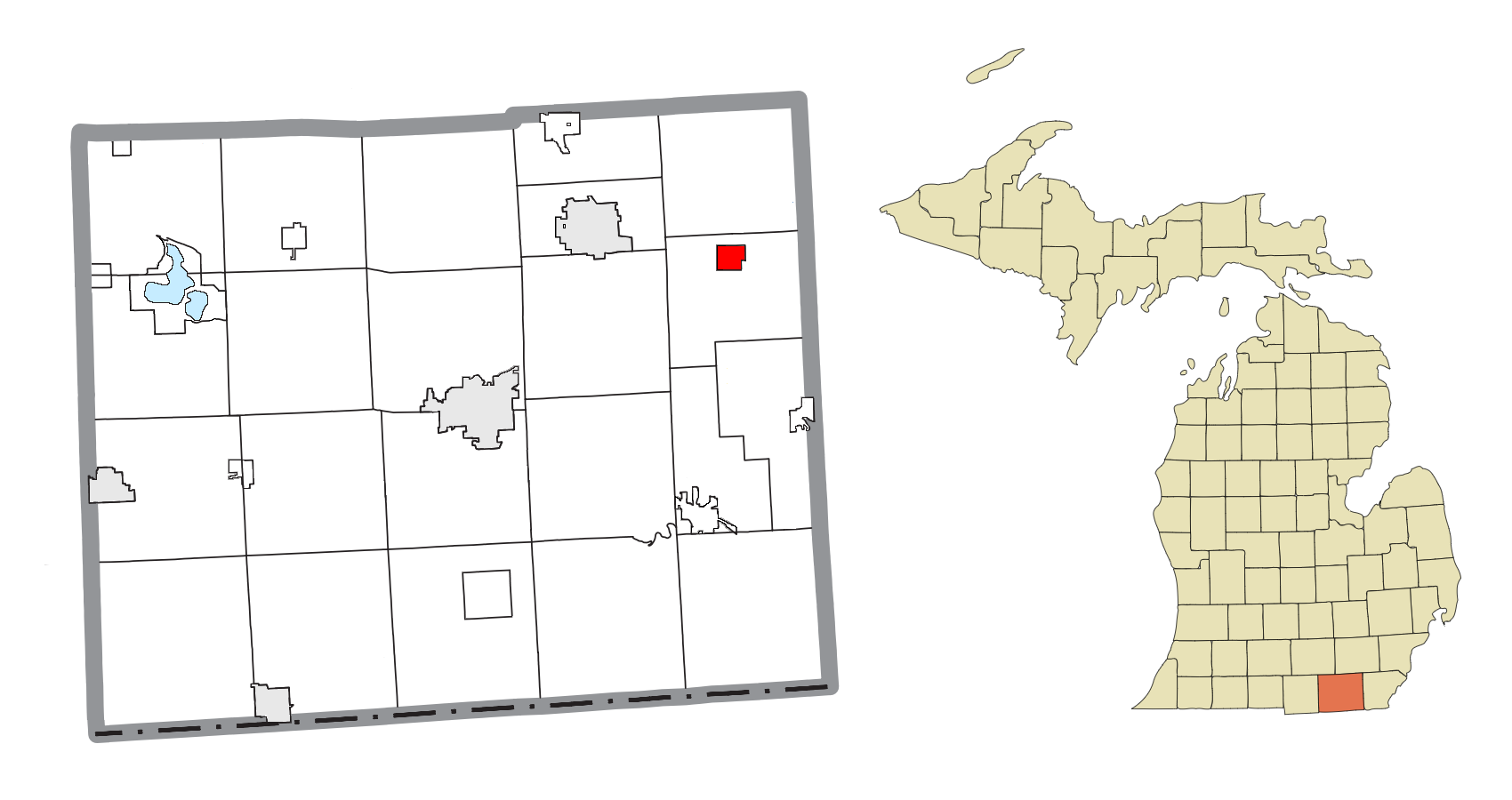
- Location within Lenawee County

- Location in Michigan Location in the United States
- Coordinates: 41°59′15″N 83°49′53″W
- Country: United States
- State: Michigan
- County: Lenawee
- Township: Ridgeway

Government
  - Type: Village council
  - President: Richard Frazier

Area
  - Total: 0.79 sq mi (2.05 km^{2})
  - Land: 0.79 sq mi (2.05 km^{2})
  - Water: 0 sq mi (0.00 km^{2})
- Elevation: 699 ft (213 m)

Population (2020)
  - Total: 537
  - Density: 678.5/sq mi (261.96/km^{2})
- Time zone: UTC-5 (Eastern (EST))
  - Summer (DST): UTC-4 (EDT)
- ZIP code(s): 49229
- Area code: 517
- FIPS code: 26-10760
- GNIS feature ID: 2397458
- Website: www.villageofbritton.org

Britton is a village in Lenawee County in the U.S. state of Michigan. The population was 537 at the 2020 census. The village is located within Ridgeway Township.

== History ==
The village of Britton was originally called Balch and was established after the Wabash Railroad built a station there in 1881 and a post office opened on August 13, 1881. In 1888, a local storekeeper in charge of the post office named John Britton, paid $500 to have the town renamed after himself. The post office name was changed from Balch to Britton on April 13, 1888.

== Geography ==
According to the United States Census Bureau, the village has a total area of 0.79 square miles (2.05 km^{2}), all land. Britton is located on the M-50, about nine miles (14 km) northeast of Adrian, along a line of the Norfolk Southern Railway. The main industries are agriculture and small business. Britton is located about six miles west of Dundee.

== Demographics ==
Historical population
Census	Pop.	Note	%±
1900	345		—
1910	370		7.2%
1920	383		3.5%
1930	368		−3.9%
1940	409		11.1%
1950	517		26.4%
1960	622		20.3%
1970	697		12.1%
1980	693		−0.6%
1990	694		0.1%
2000	699		0.7%
2010	586		−16.2%
2020	537		−8.4%
U.S. Decennial Census

=== 2010 census ===
As of the census of 2010, there were 586 people, 237 households, and 166 families living in the village. The population density was 741.8 inhabitants per square mile (286.4/km^{2}). There were 268 housing units at an average density of 339.2 per square mile (131.0/km^{2}). The racial makeup of the village was 98.6% White, 0.2% African American, 0.2% Native American, 0.3% Asian, 0.3% from other races, and 0.3% from two or more races. Hispanic or Latino of any race were 1.9% of the population.

There were 237 households, of which 32.5% had children under the age of 18 living with them, 51.1% were married couples living together, 11.8% had a female householder with no husband present, 7.2% had a male householder with no wife present, and 30.0% were non-families. 25.3% of all households were made up of individuals, and 8.1% had someone living alone who was 65 years of age or older. The average household size was 2.47 and the average family size was 2.87.

The median age in the village was 38.8 years. 22.2% of residents were under the age of 18; 9.4% were between the ages of 18 and 24; 28.2% were from 25 to 44; 28.5% were from 45 to 64; and 11.8% were 65 years of age or older. The gender makeup of the village was 50.5% male and 49.5% female.

=== 2000 census ===
As of the census of 2000, there were 699 people, 261 households, and 196 families living in the village. The population density was 799.6 inhabitants per square mile (308.7/km^{2}). There were 268 housing units at an average density of 306.6 per square mile (118.4/km^{2}). The racial makeup of the village was 97.71% White, 0.72% African American, 0.14% Asian, 0.72% from other races, and 0.72% from two or more races. Hispanic or Latino of any race were 2.43% of the population.

There were 261 households, out of which 42.1% had children under the age of 18 living with them, 59.0% were married couples living together, 11.1% had a female householder with no husband present, and 24.9% were non-families. 21.8% of all households were made up of individuals, and 9.2% had someone living alone who was 65 years of age or older. The average household size was 2.68 and the average family size was 3.14.

In the village, 29.8% of the population was under the age of 18, 9.6% from 18 to 24, 31.5% from 25 to 44, 18.7% from 45 to 64, and 10.4% was 65 years of age or older. The median age was 34 years. For every 100 females, there were 98.6 males. For every 100 females age 18 and over, there were 96.4 males.

The median income for a household in the village was $49,091, and the median income for a family was $50,703. Males had a median income of $39,861 versus $26,000 for females. The per capita income for the village was $18,087. About 7.8% of families and 7.3% of the population were below the poverty line, including 11.4% of those under age 18 and 7.8% of those age 65 or over.

== Education ==
The village of Britton is home to the Britton-Macon Area School District, often shortened to Britton-Macon. The school covers the area of Britton, as well as Macon and Ridgeway Townships. However, the school also attracts many students from surrounding cities, villages and townships for various personal, academic and athletic reasons.

The school is located at 201 College Ave just off of M-50. There is one building in Britton, which provides for the students in K-12.

The Britton-Macon Tories are a member of the Tri-County Conference.

== Notable person ==
- Duane Below, starting pitcher for the Detroit Tigers and Miami Marlins; born in Britton

== Gallery ==
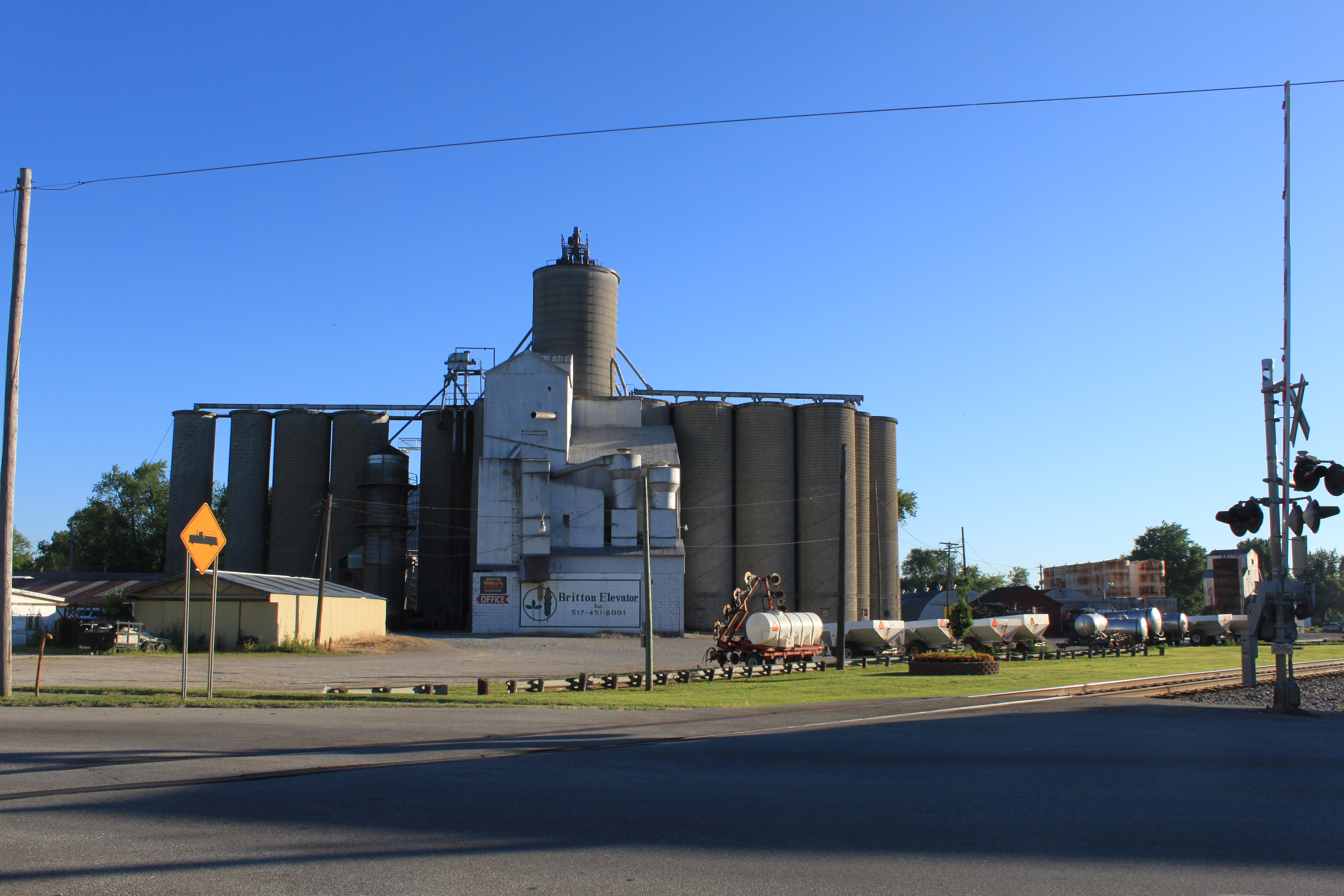
Britton Elevator Inc., N. Main St.

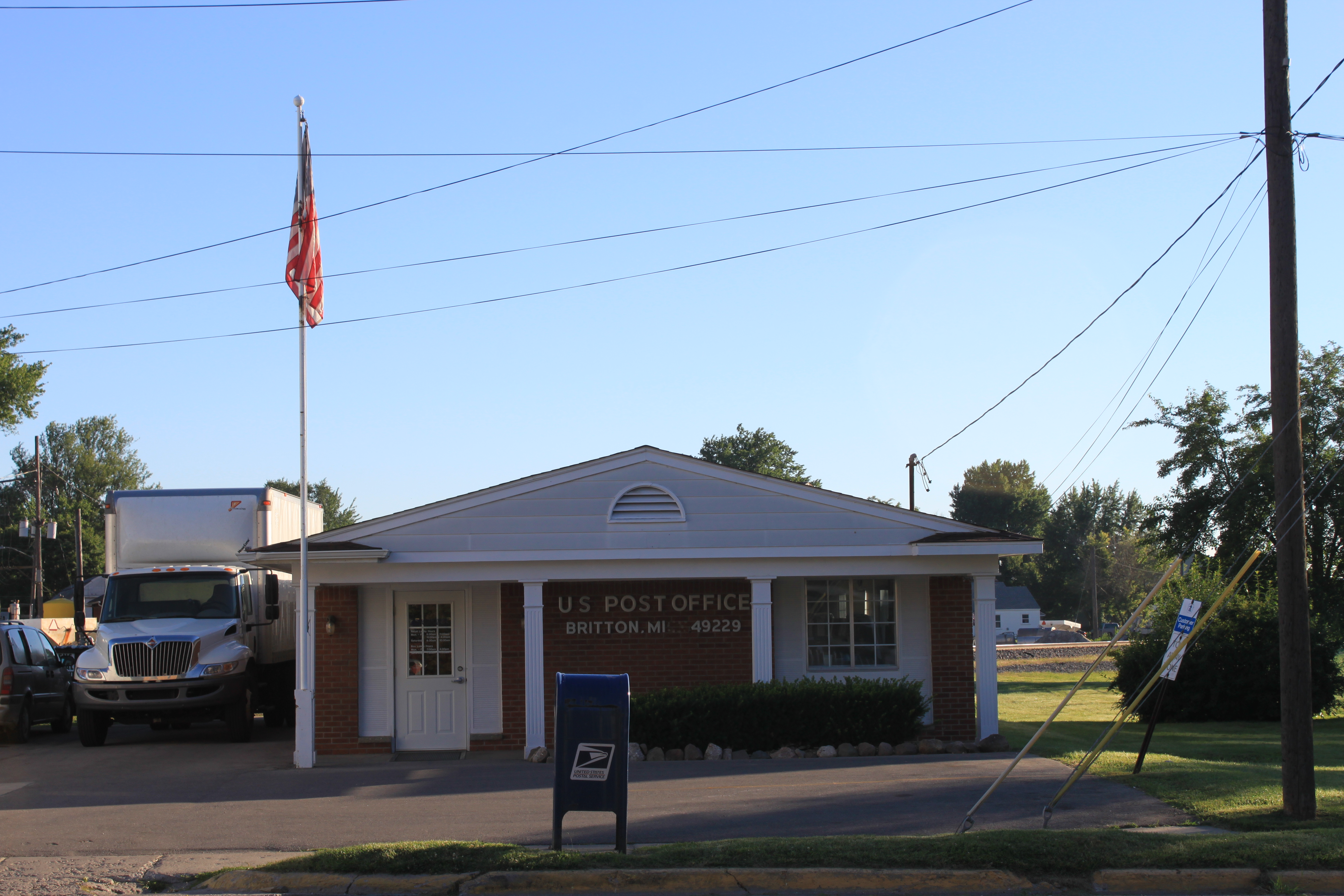
Britton Post office, E. Chicago Blvd.

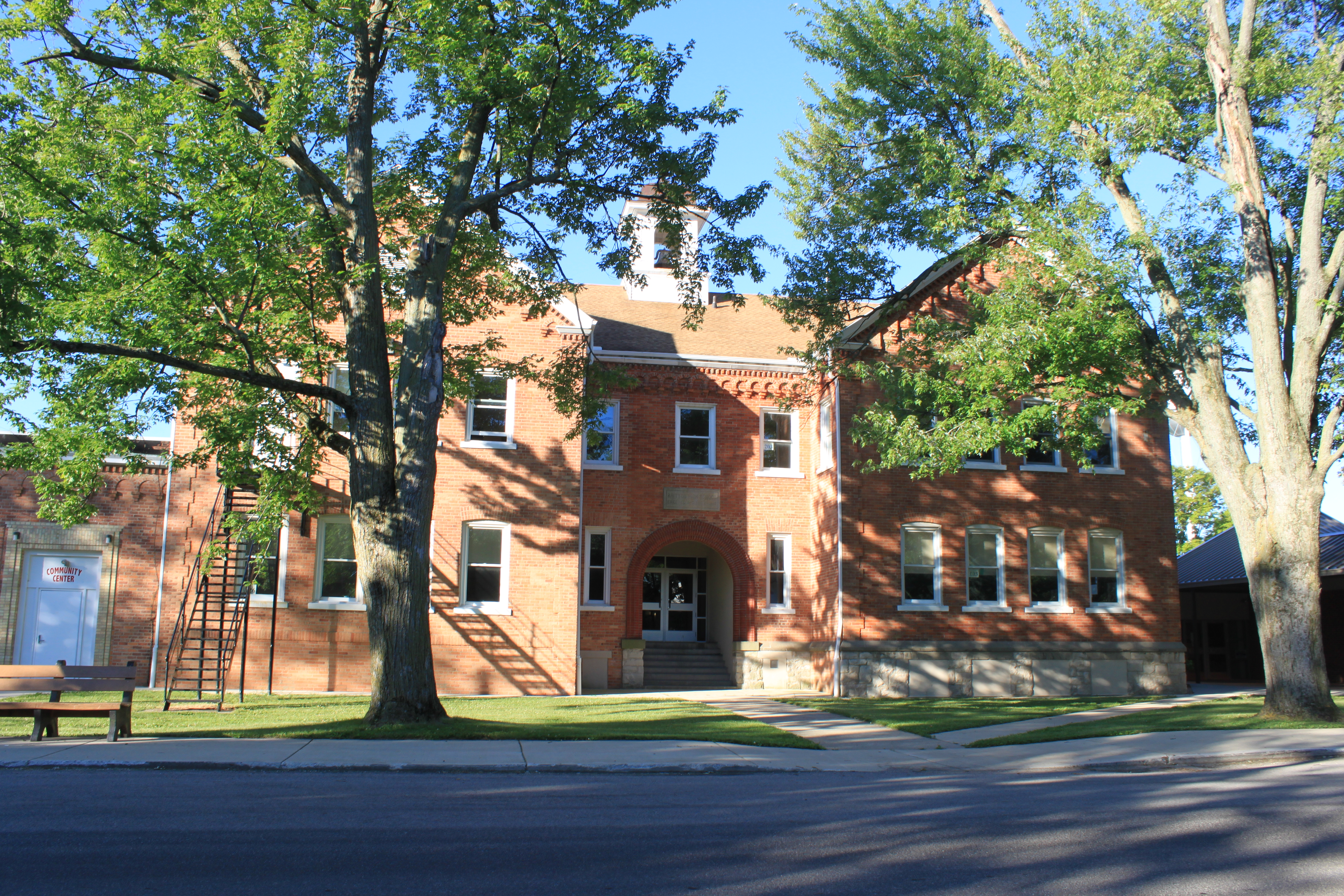
Britton High School, College Ave.

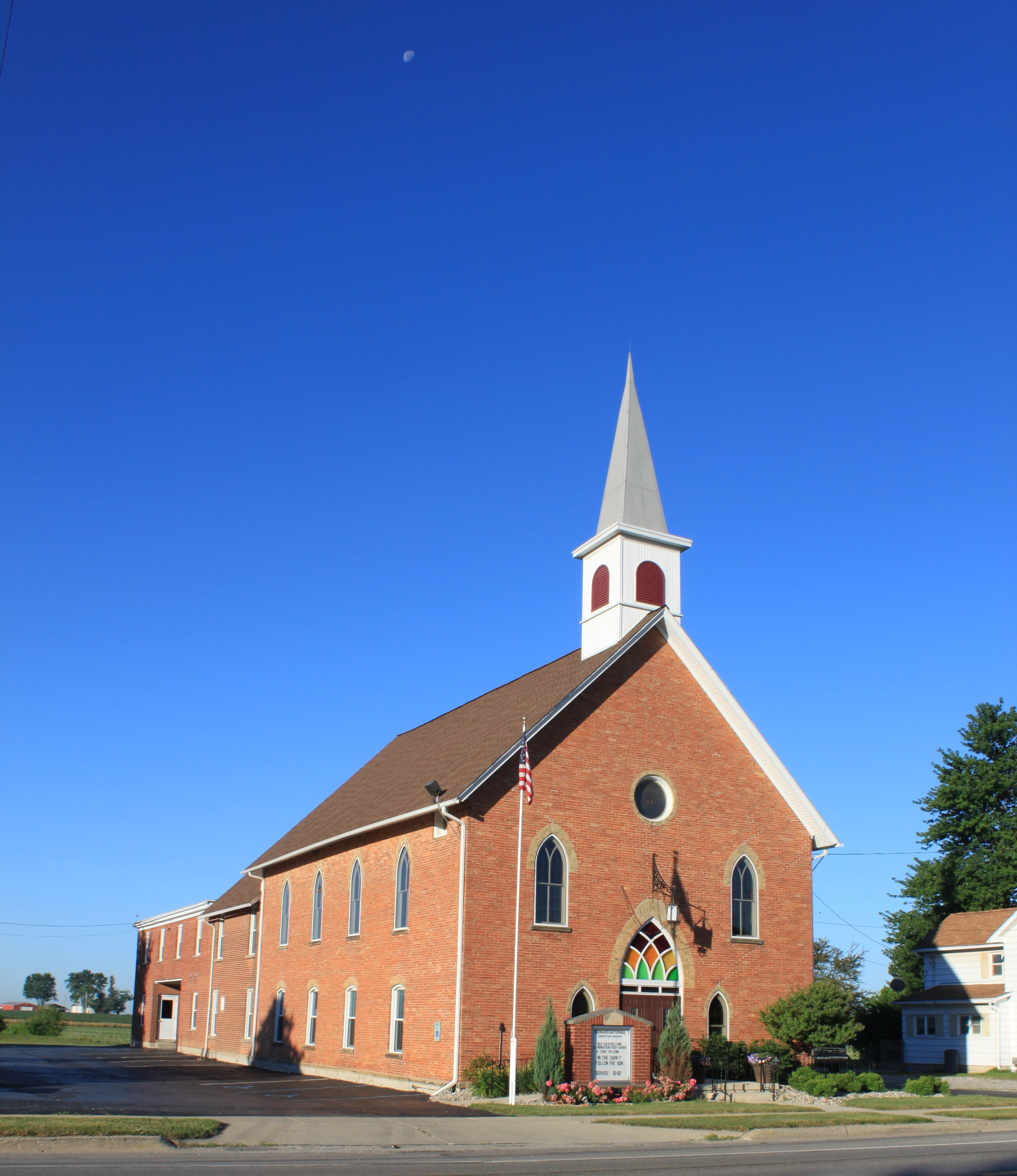
Congregational Christian Church, E. Chicago Blvd.

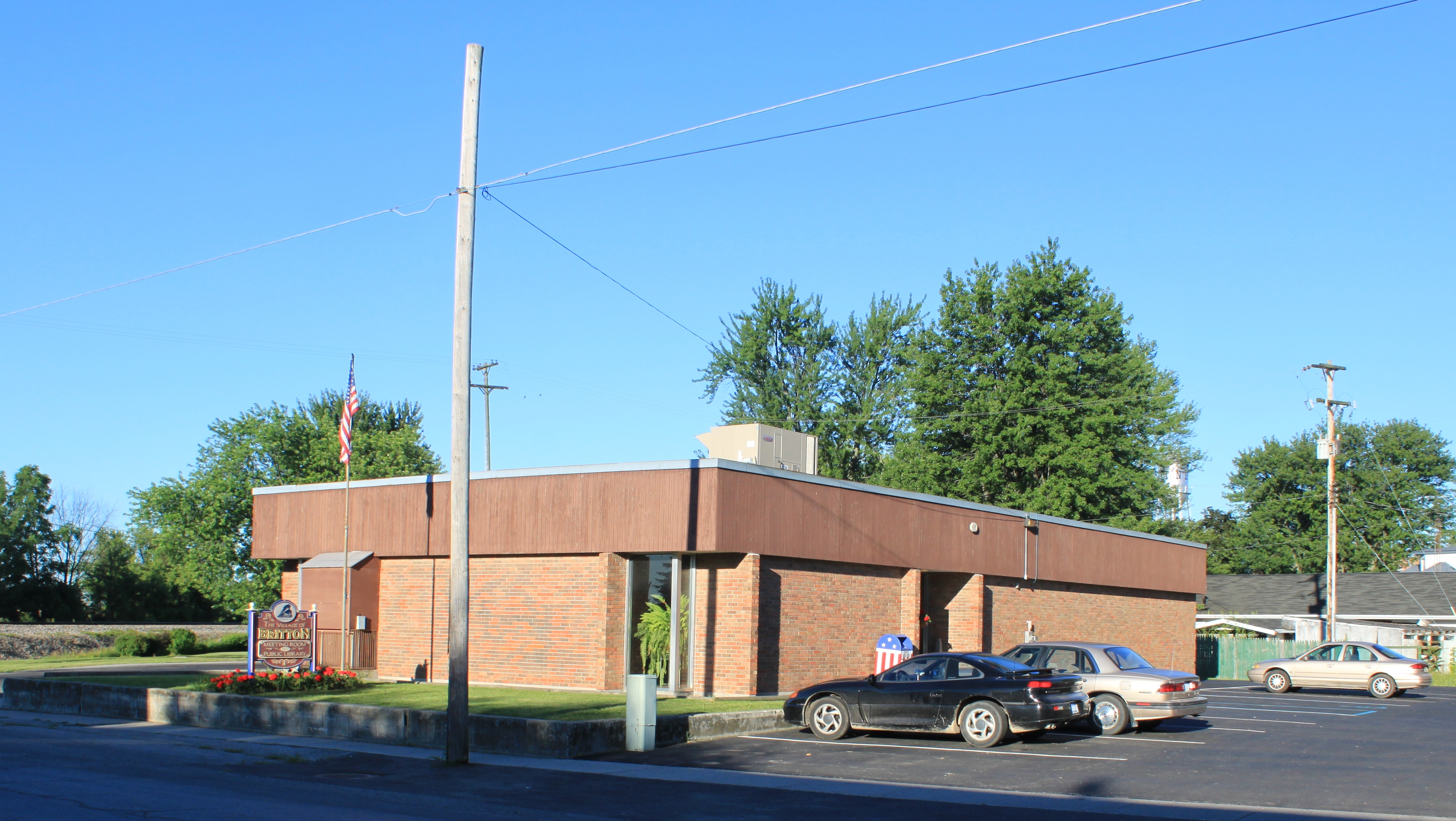
Britton Public Library, S. Main St.
