= Summerfield Township, Monroe County, Michigan =

Summerfield Township, Michigan
- Civil township
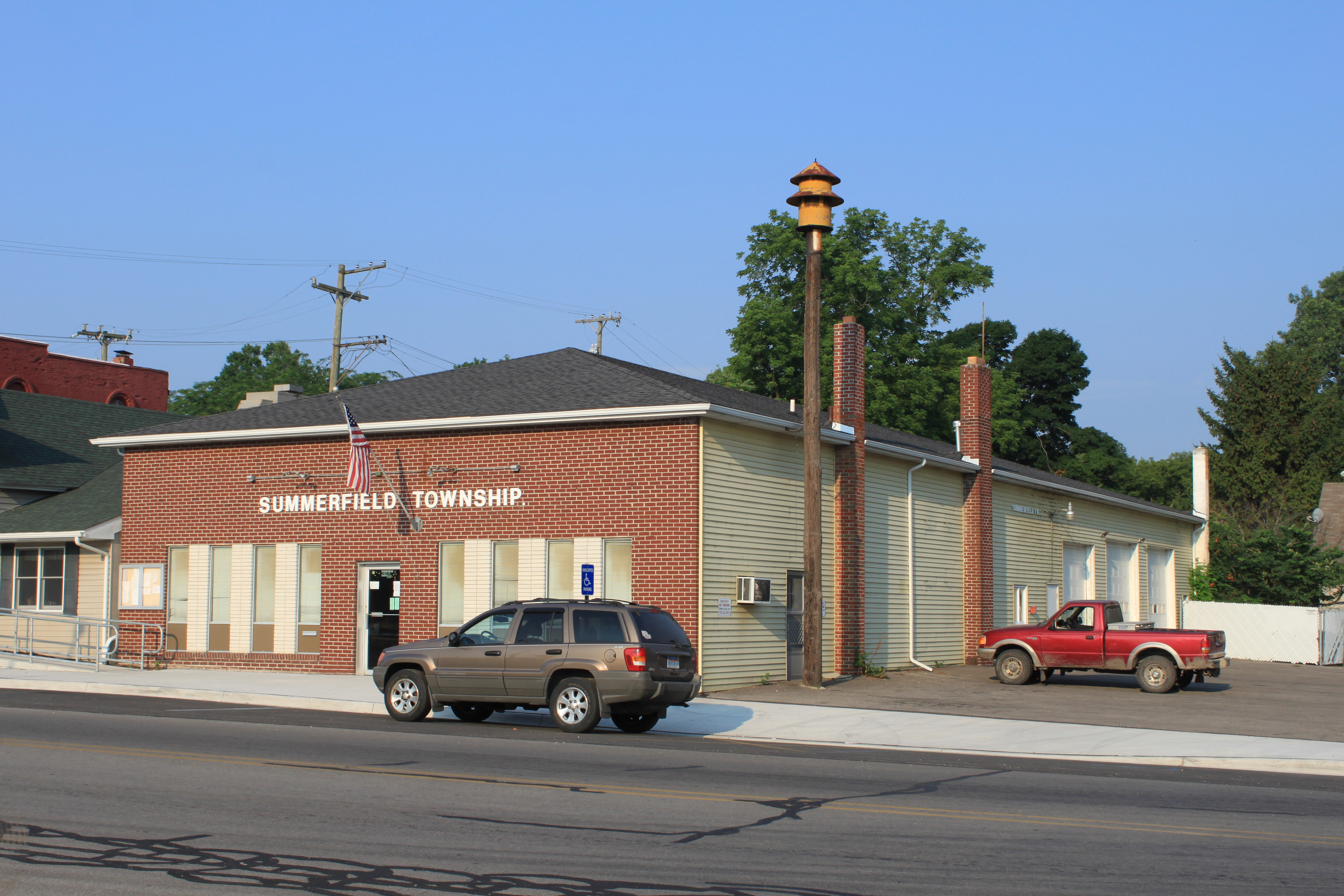
- Township Hall on Saline Street

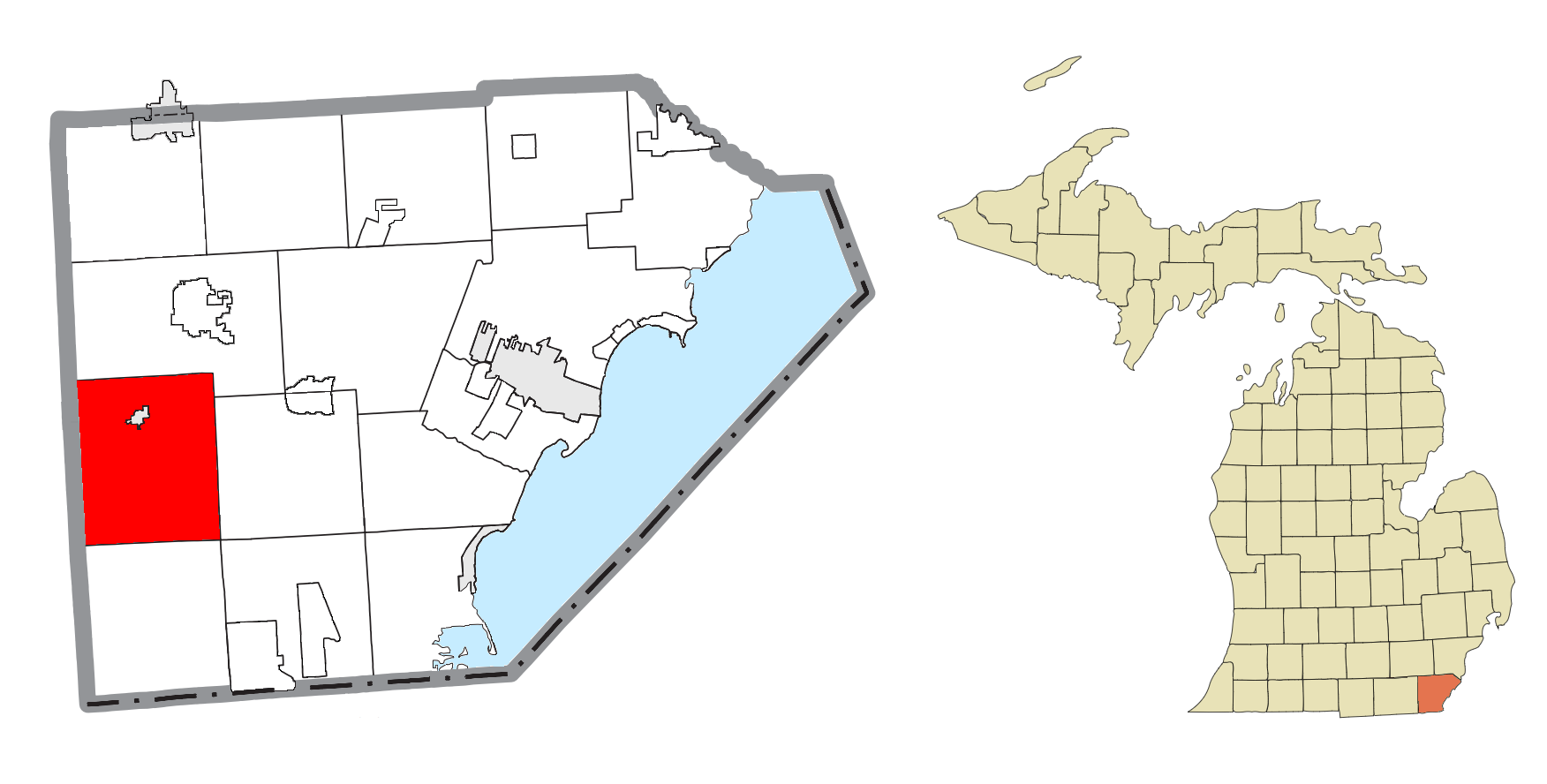
- Location within Monroe County and the state of Michigan

- Location within Michigan Location within the United States
- Coordinates: 41°52′40″N 83°42′58″W
- Country: United States
- State: Michigan
- County: Monroe

Government
  - Supervisor: Dominic Lucarelli
  - Clerk: Alexa Kolbe

Area
  - Total: 42.33 sq mi (109.6 km^{2})
  - Land: 41.98 sq mi (108.7 km^{2})
  - Water: 0.35 sq mi (0.91 km^{2})
- Elevation: 679 ft (207 m)

Population (2020)
  - Total: 3,176
  - Density: 75.7/sq mi (29.2/km^{2})
- Time zone: UTC-5 (Eastern (EST))
  - Summer (DST): UTC-4 (EDT)
- ZIP Codes: 49270 (Petersburg); 48131 (Dundee); 49238 (Deerfield); 49276 (Riga)
- Area code: 734
- FIPS code: 26-115-77140
- GNIS feature ID: 1627134
- Website: summerfieldtwpmonroemi.gov

Summerfield Township is a civil township of Monroe County in the U.S. state of Michigan. The population was 3,176 at the 2020 census.

== Geography ==
The township is in western Monroe County and is bordered to the west by Lenawee County. The city of Petersburg, a separate municipality, is surrounded by the northern part of the township. The city of Monroe, the Monroe county seat, is 18 miles (29 km) to the east of the center of the township, and Dundee is 9 miles (14 km) to the north. Toledo, Ohio, is 18 miles to the southeast.

According to the U.S. Census Bureau, Summerfield Township has a total area of 42.33 square miles (109.63 km^{2}), of which 41.98 square miles (108.73 km^{2}) are land and 0.35 square miles (0.91 km^{2}), or 0.83%, are water.

== Demographics ==
Historical population
Census	Pop.	Note	%±
1850	472		—
1860	962		103.8%
1870	1,464		52.2%
1880	1,829		24.9%
1890	1,858		1.6%
1900	2,169		16.7%
1910	2,008		−7.4%
1920	1,962		−2.3%
1930	2,128		8.5%
1940	2,311		8.6%
1950	2,798		21.1%
1960	3,386		21.0%
1970	3,844		13.5%
1980	3,176		−17.4%
1990	3,076		−3.1%
2000	3,233		5.1%
2010	3,308		2.3%
2020	3,176		−4.0%
U.S. Decennial Census

As of the census of 2000, there were 3,233 people, 1,098 households, and 911 families residing in the township. The population density was 76.6 inhabitants per square mile (29.6/km^{2}). There were 1,134 housing units at an average density of 26.9 per square mile (10.4/km^{2}). The racial makeup of the township was 98.08% White, 0.25% African American, 0.09% Native American, 0.06% Asian, 1.30% from other races, and 0.22% from two or more races. Hispanic or Latino of any race were 2.78% of the population.

There were 1,098 households, out of which 37.6% had children under the age of 18 living with them, 74.0% were married couples living together, 5.7% had a female householder with no husband present, and 17.0% were non-families. 13.8% of all households were made up of individuals, and 6.1% had someone living alone who was 65 years of age or older. The average household size was 2.91 and the average family size was 3.18.

In the township the population was spread out, with 27.2% under the age of 18, 7.6% from 18 to 24, 29.9% from 25 to 44, 25.5% from 45 to 64, and 9.8% who were 65 years of age or older. The median age was 37 years. For every 100 females, there were 108.9 males. For every 100 females age 18 and over, there were 105.9 males.

The median income for a household in the township was $62,105, and the median income for a family was $66,200. Males had a median income of $47,468 versus $29,917 for females. The per capita income for the township was $24,057. About 2.3% of families and 3.8% of the population were below the poverty line, including 2.4% of those under age 18 and 5.9% of those age 65 or over.

== Highways ==
- US 23 runs north-south across the eastern part of the township.

== Gallery ==
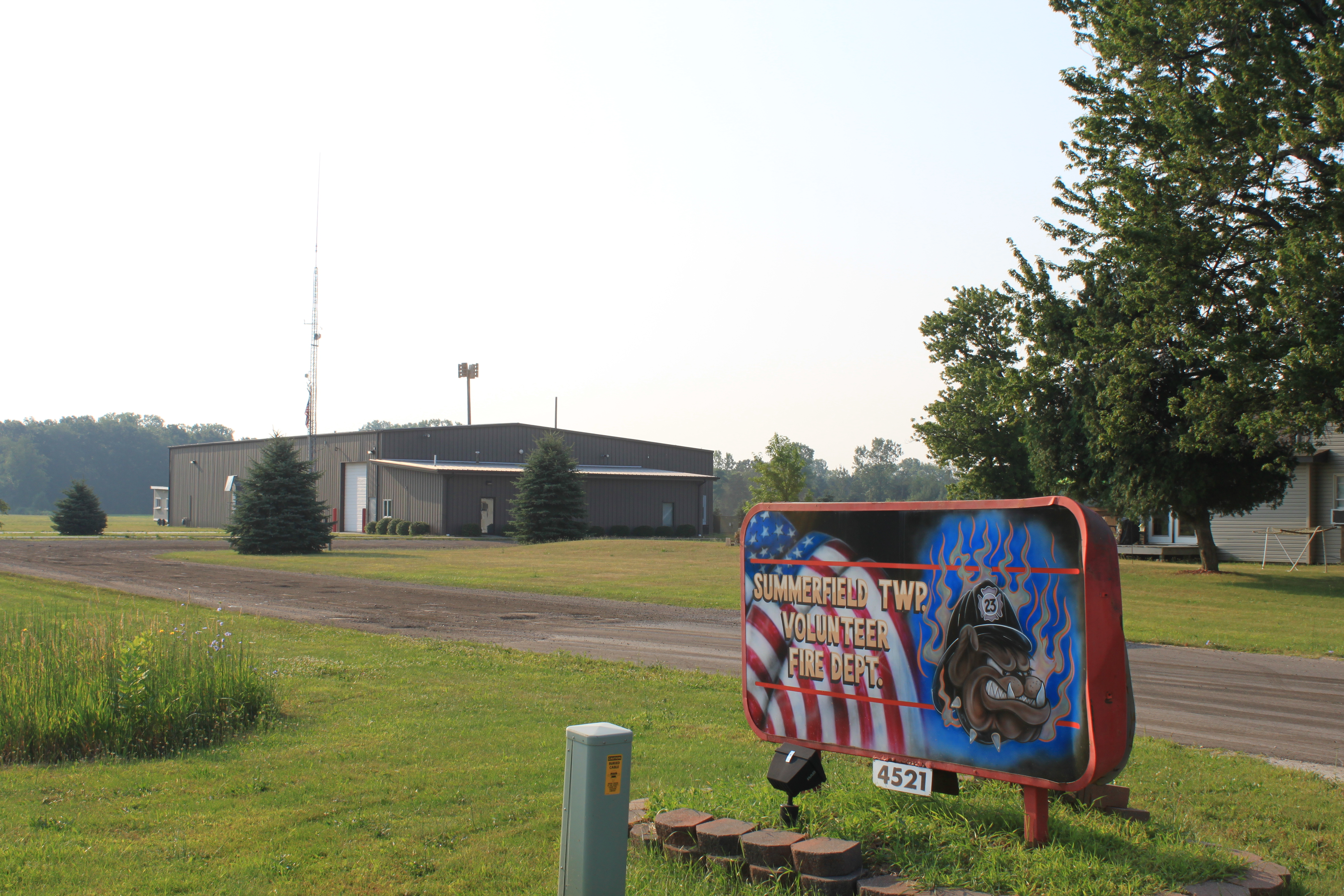
Volunteer Fire Dept., Sylvania Petersburg Rd.

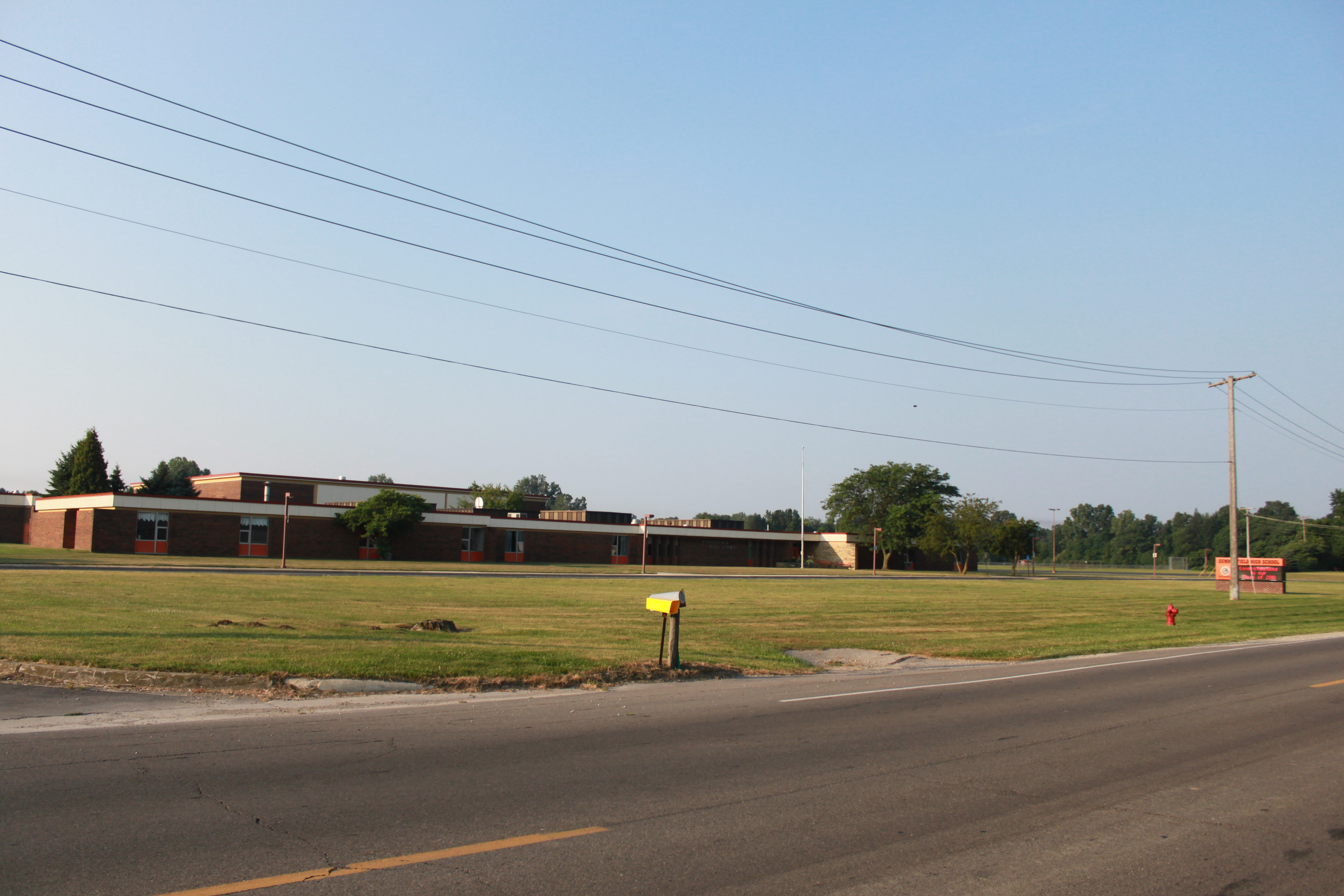
Summerfield High School

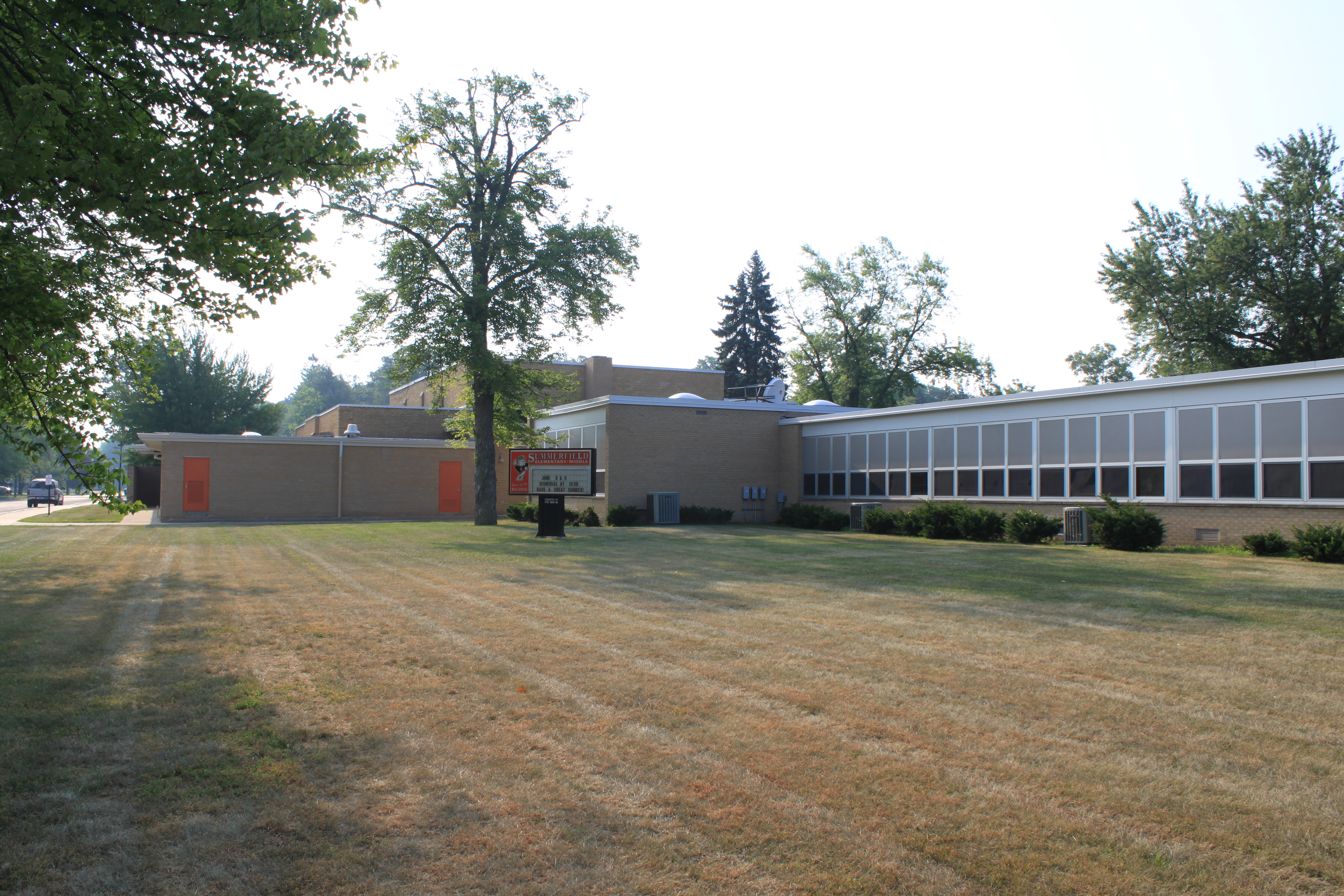
Summerfield Elementary and Middle School
