= Deerfield, Michigan =

- Village
- Village of Deerfield
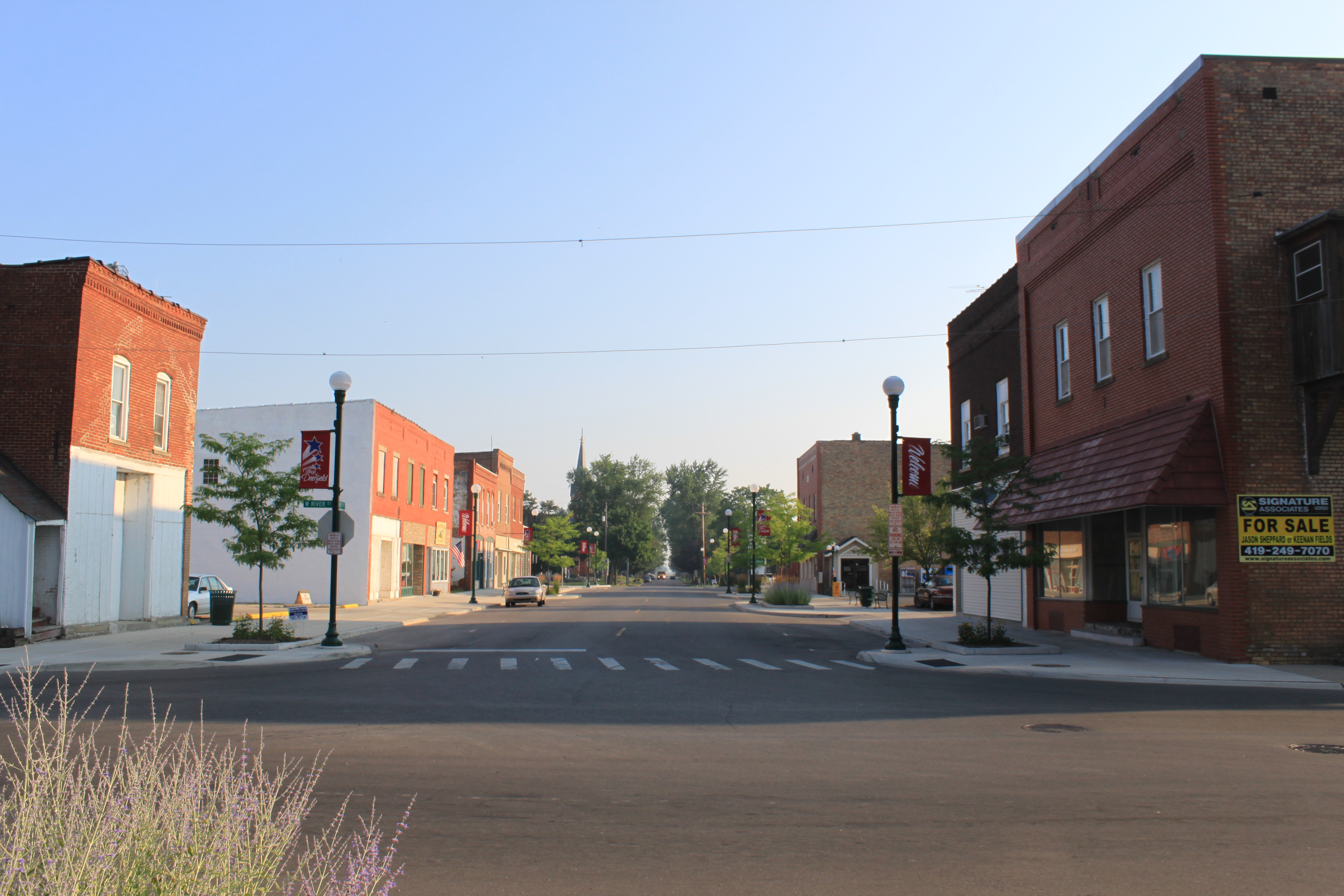
- Downtown Deerfield along Carey Street

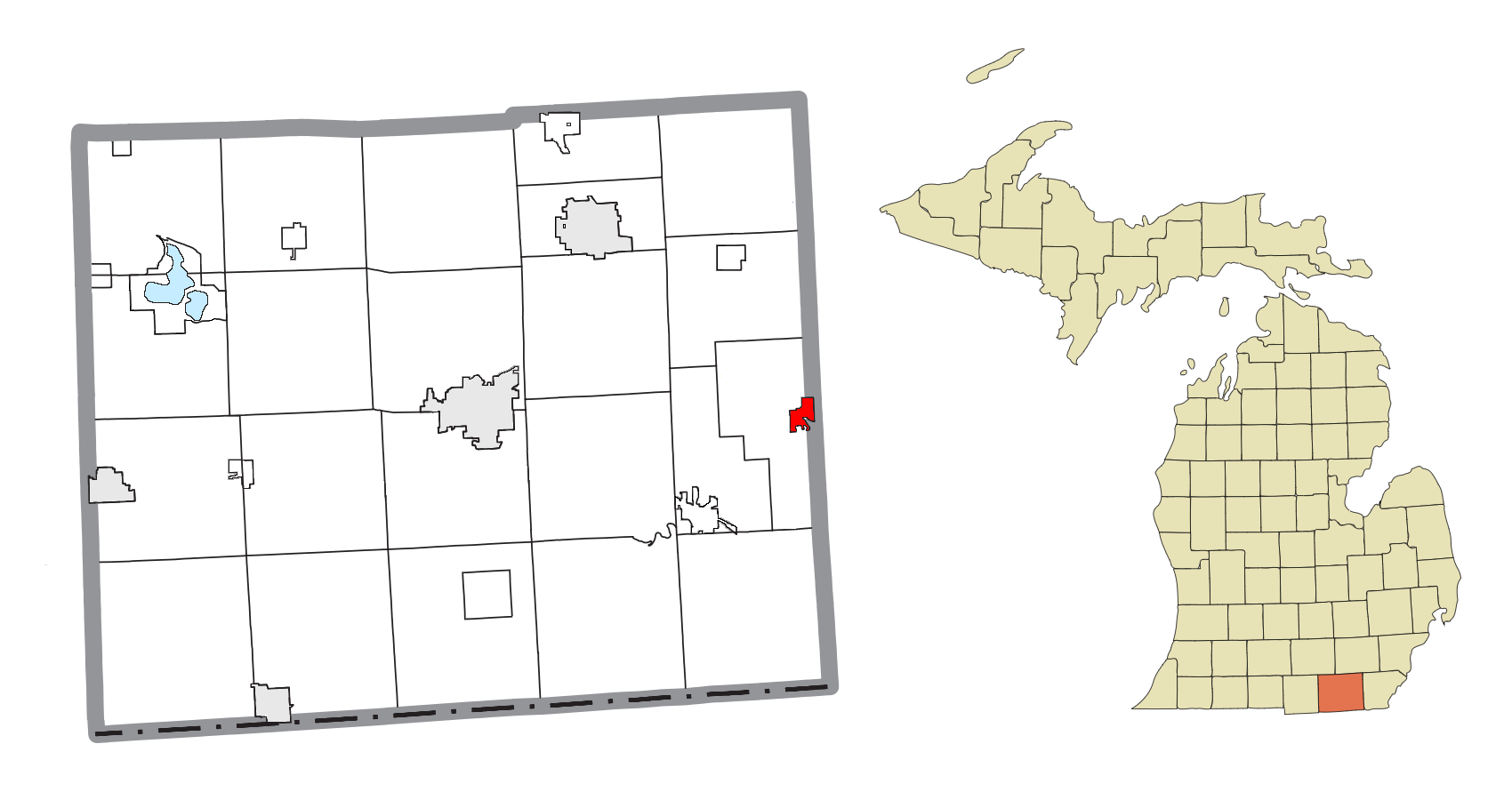
- Location within Lenawee County

- Location within the state of Michigan Location within the United States
- Coordinates: 41°53′22″N 83°46′43″W
- Country: United States
- State: Michigan
- County: Lenawee
- Township: Deerfield
- Settled: 1826
- Incorporated: 1873

Government
  - Type: Village council
  - President: Todd Nighswander
  - Clerk: Denise Wylie
  - Treasurer: Holly Rickard

Area
  - Total: 0.95 sq mi (2.46 km^{2})
  - Land: 0.95 sq mi (2.46 km^{2})
  - Water: 0 sq mi (0.00 km^{2})
- Elevation: 673 ft (205 m)

Population (2020)
  - Total: 901
  - Density: 948.42/sq mi (366.19/km^{2})
- Time zone: UTC-5 (Eastern (EST))
  - Summer (DST): UTC-4 (EDT)
- ZIP code(s): 49238
- Area code: 517
- FIPS code: 26-21180
- GNIS feature ID: 0624496
- Website: Official website

Deerfield is a village in Lenawee County in the U.S. state of Michigan. The population was 901 at the 2020 census. The village is located within Deerfield Township.

== History ==
The first land purchase in the area was by William Kedzie from Delhi, New York, who bought land here in 1824. He became the area's first resident when he moved here two years later. He became the first postmaster of the new community when a post office opened on March 20, 1828. The community was named Kedzie's Grove. It was renamed to Deerfield on August 19, 1837. The name came from the numerous deer in the area, and Deerfield incorporated as a village in 1873.

== Geography ==
According to the U.S. Census Bureau, the village has a total area of 0.95 square miles (2.46 km^{2}), all land.

The River Raisin flows through the area and forms most of the southern border of the village.

== Demographics ==
Historical population
Census	Pop.	Note	%±
1890	421		—
1900	440		4.5%
1910	443		0.7%
1920	442		−0.2%
1930	512		15.8%
1940	569		11.1%
1950	725		27.4%
1960	866		19.4%
1970	834		−3.7%
1980	957		14.7%
1990	922		−3.7%
2000	1,005		9.0%
2010	898		−10.6%
2020	901		0.3%
U.S. Decennial Census

=== 2010 census ===
As of the census of 2010, there were 898 people, 343 households, and 258 families residing in the village. The population density was 935.4 inhabitants per square mile (361.2/km^{2}). There were 372 housing units at an average density of 387.5 per square mile (149.6/km^{2}). The racial makeup of the village was 95.0% White, 0.4% African American, 0.9% Native American, 0.1% Asian, 0.4% from other races, and 3.1% from two or more races. Hispanic or Latino of any race were 4.1% of the population.

There were 343 households, of which 38.2% had children under the age of 18 living with them, 57.4% were married couples living together, 14.0% had a female householder with no husband present, 3.8% had a male householder with no wife present, and 24.8% were non-families. 21.6% of all households were made up of individuals, and 8.2% had someone living alone who was 65 years of age or older. The average household size was 2.62 and the average family size was 3.00.

The median age in the village was 38.4 years. 26.3% of residents were under the age of 18; 8.2% were between the ages of 18 and 24; 25.6% were from 25 to 44; 27% were from 45 to 64; and 12.9% were 65 years of age or older. The gender makeup of the village was 48.9% male and 51.1% female.

=== 2000 census ===
As of the census of 2000, there were 1,005 people, 358 households, and 272 families residing in the village. The population density was 1,073.2 inhabitants per square mile (414.4/km^{2}). There were 371 housing units at an average density of 396.2 per square mile (153.0/km^{2}). The racial makeup of the village was 97.51% White, 0.10% African American, 0.10% Asian, 2.09% from other races, and 0.20% from two or more races. Hispanic or Latino of any race were 3.18% of the population.

There were 358 households, out of which 42.7% had children under the age of 18 living with them, 61.5% were married couples living together, 9.5% had a female householder with no husband present, and 24.0% were non-families. 20.4% of all households were made up of individuals, and 11.2% had someone living alone who was 65 years of age or older. The average household size was 2.81 and the average family size was 3.25.

In the village the population was spread out, with 31.2% under the age of 18, 8.2% from 18 to 24, 30.2% from 25 to 44, 19.8% from 45 to 64, and 10.5% who were 65 years of age or older. The median age was 32 years. For every 100 females, there were 94.4 males. For every 100 females age 18 and over, there were 89.3 males.

The median income for a household in the village was $49,276, and the median income for a family was $54,375. Males had a median income of $42,656 versus $24,444 for females. The per capita income for the village was $19,569. About 3.0% of families and 5.3% of the population were below the poverty line, including 5.1% of those under age 18 and 1.0% of those age 65 or over.

== Education ==
The village and surrounding area is served by the Britton Deerfield School District.

== Notable people ==
- Rachel Andresen, educator and activist, born in Deerfield
- Dustin Beurer, collegiate football coach, born in Deerfield
- Danny Thomas, actor and philanthropist, born in Deerfield

== Images ==
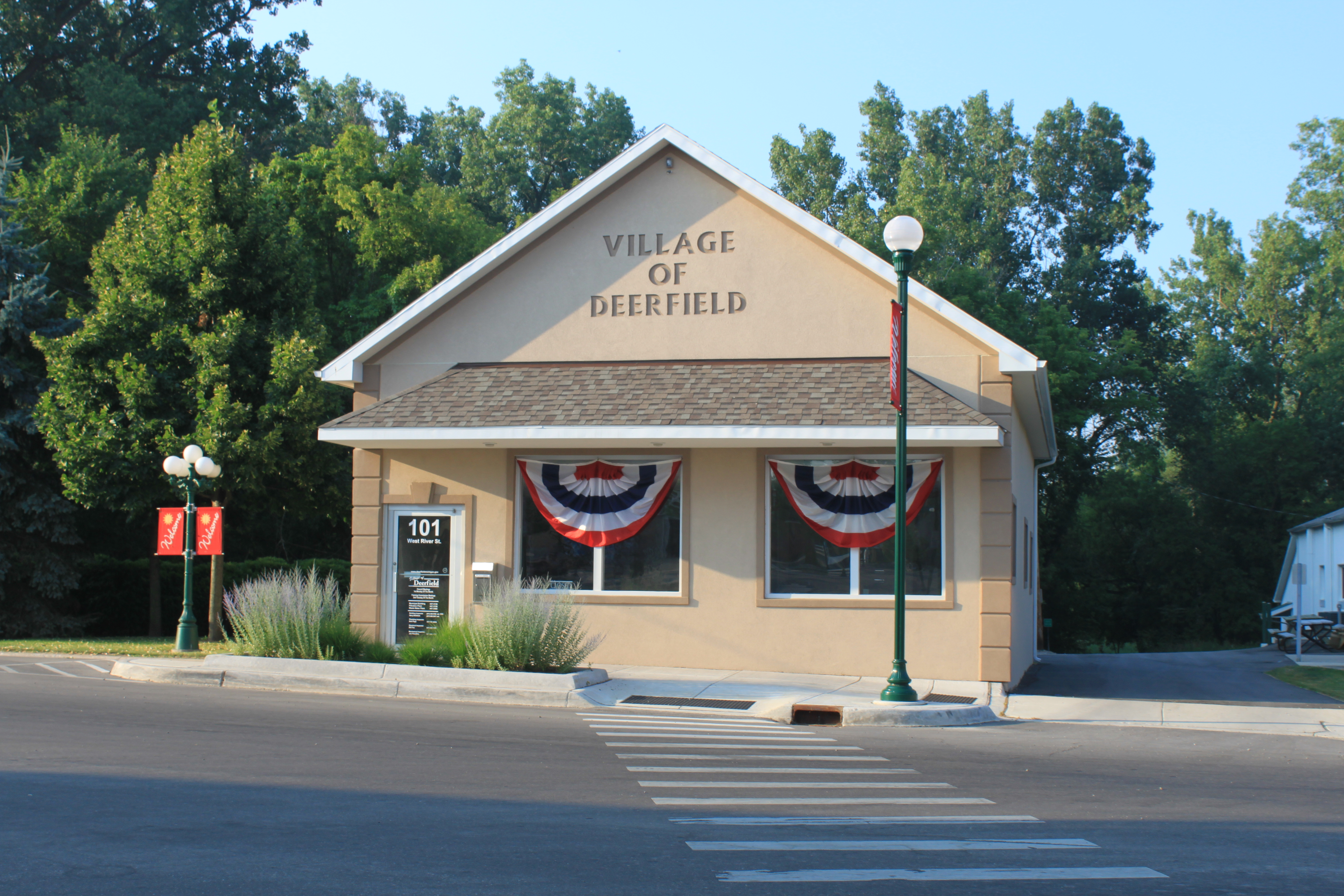
Deerfield Village Hall

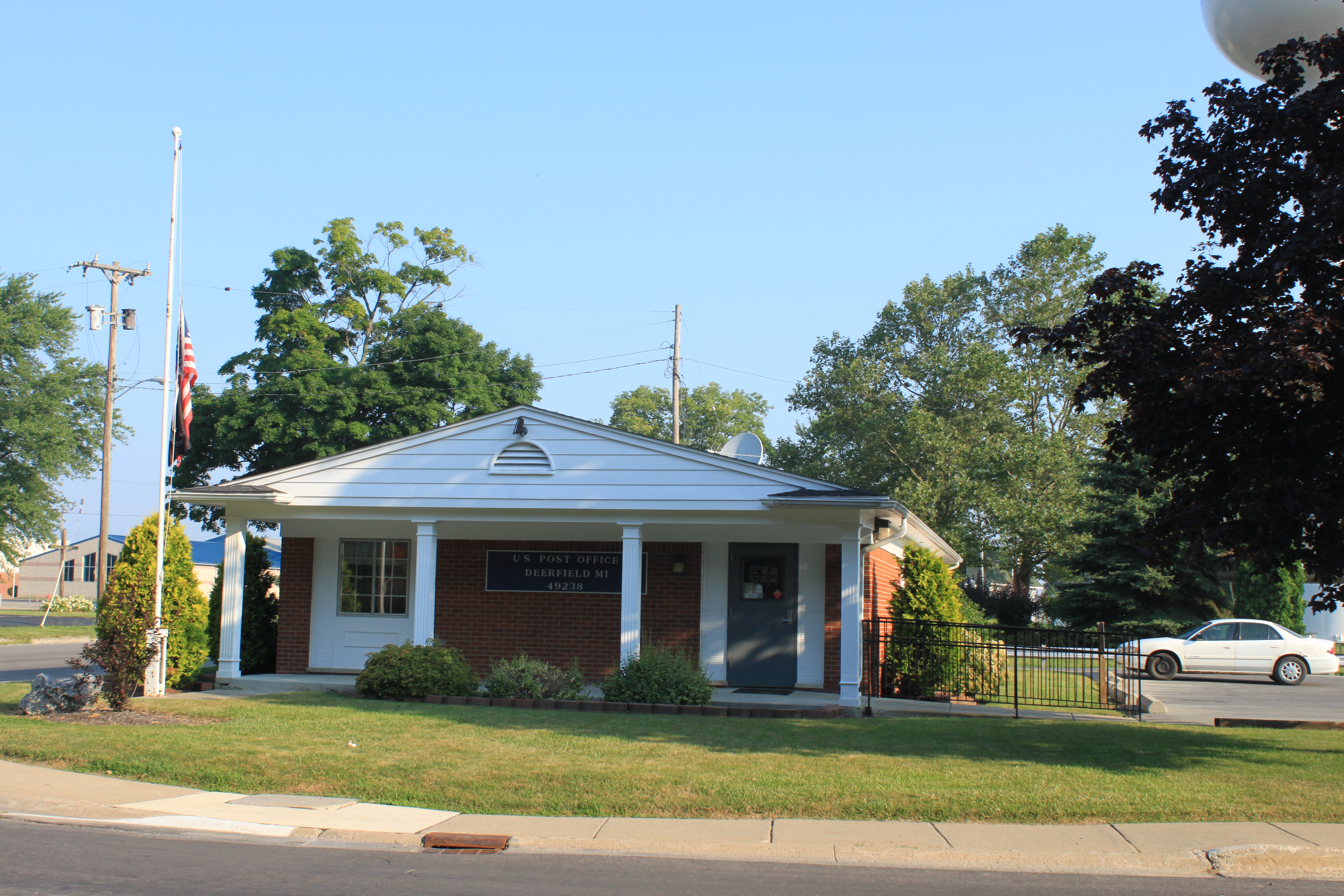
U.S. Post Office in Deerfield

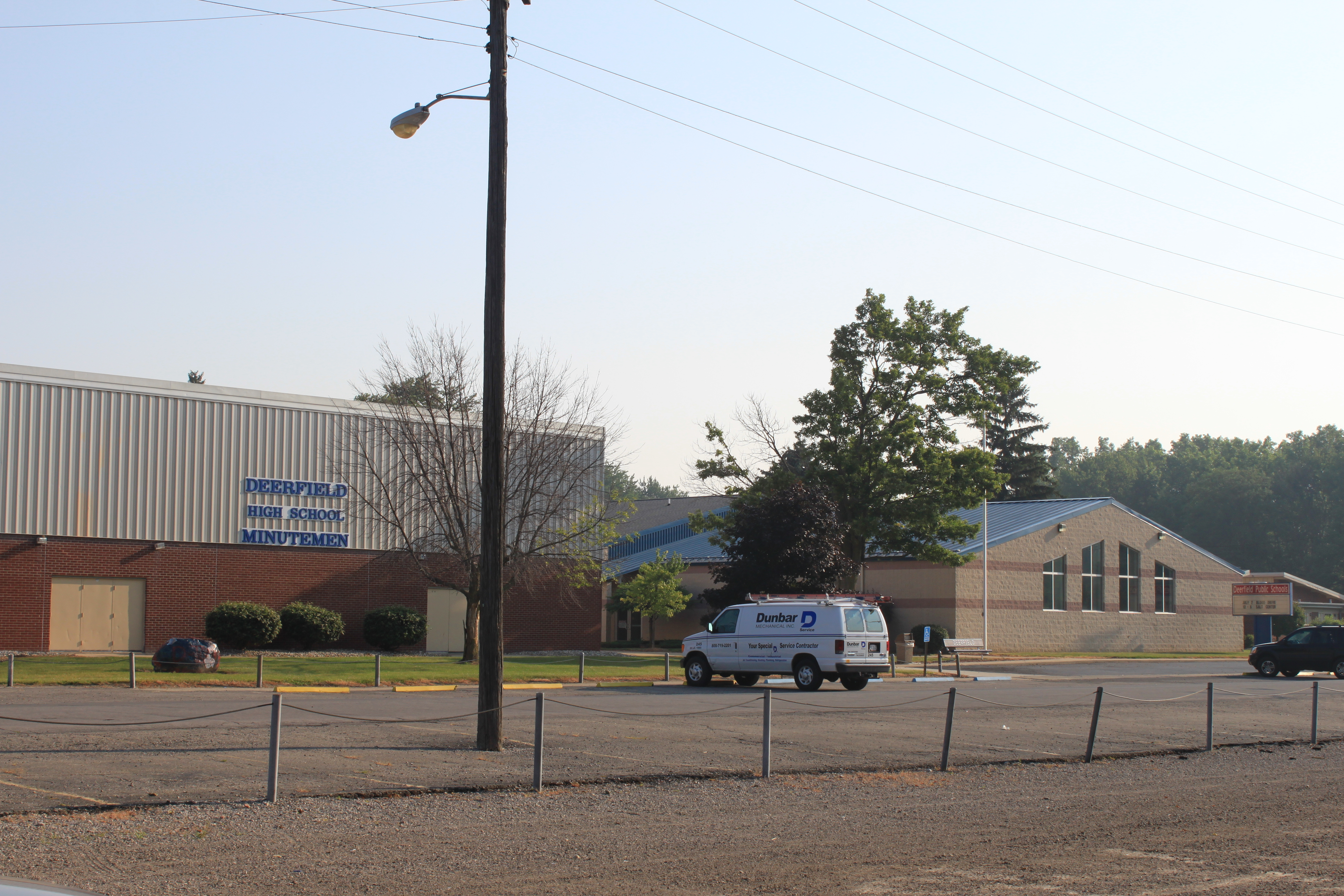
Britton Deerfield Schools
