= Lenawee =

Lenawee is a word coined by Henry Schoolcraft and may refer to:

- Lenawee County, Michigan
- Lenawee (car), manufactured from 1903 to 1904
