= Franklin Township, Lenawee County, Michigan =

Franklin Township, Michigan
- Civil township
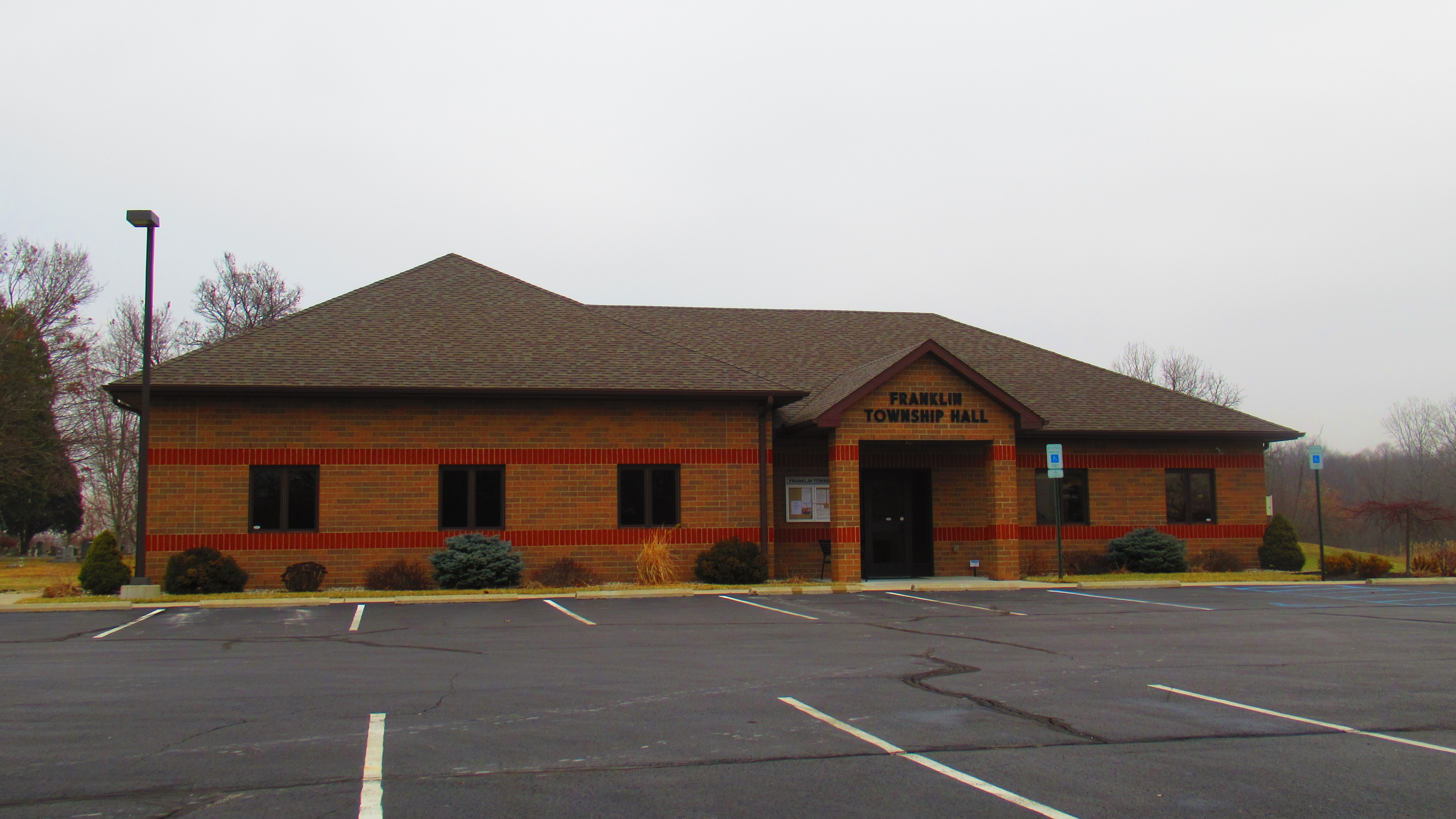
- Franklin Township Hall along M-50

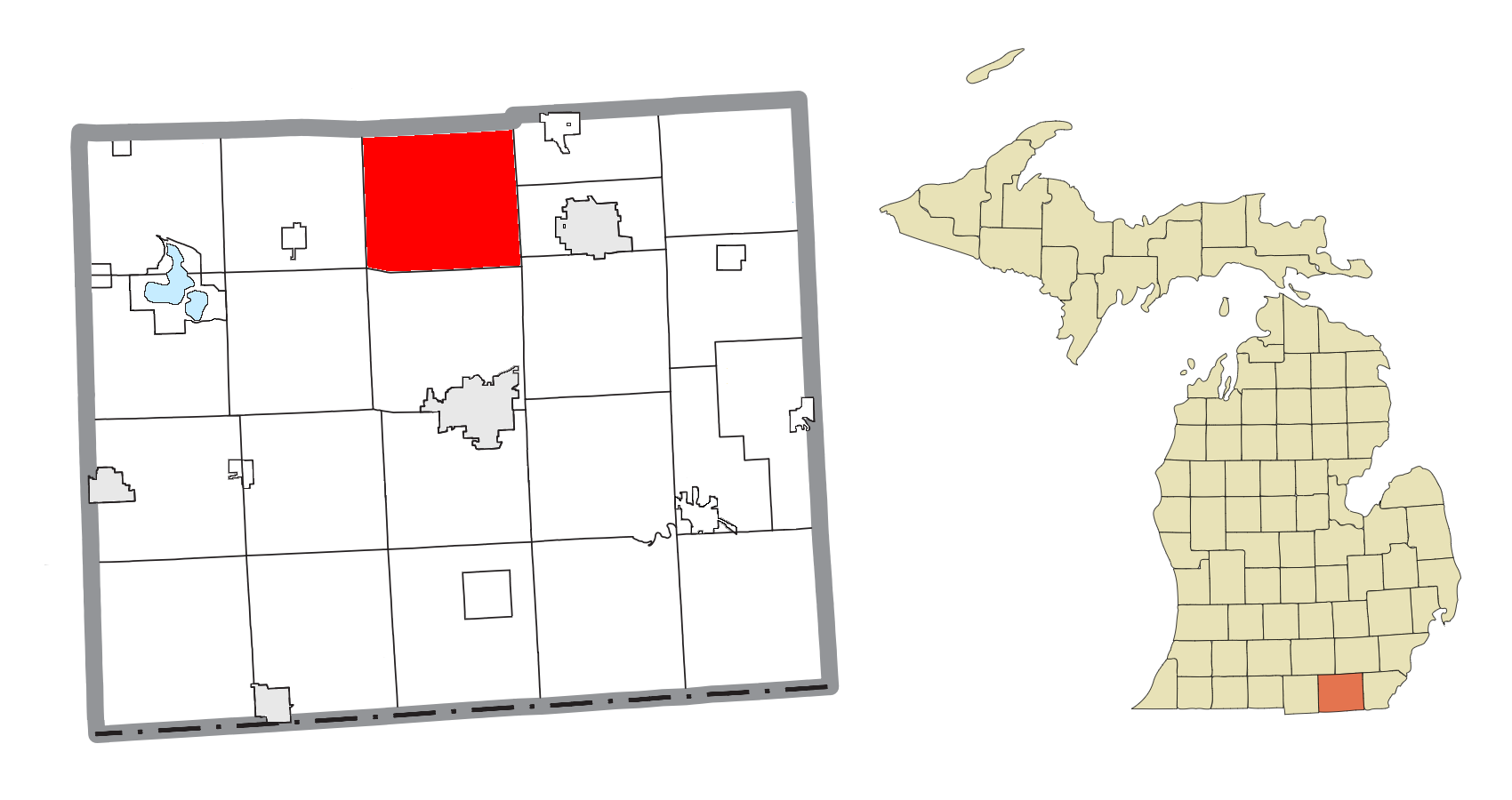
- Location within Lenawee County

- Location within the state of Michigan Franklin Township (the United States)
- Coordinates: 42°01′53″N 84°04′28″W
- Country: United States
- State: Michigan
- County: Lenawee

Government
  - Supervisor: Gordon Whelan
  - Clerk: Susan Whitehead

Area
  - Total: 39.3 sq mi (101.8 km^{2})
  - Land: 38.5 sq mi (99.7 km^{2})
  - Water: 0.85 sq mi (2.2 km^{2})
- Elevation: 958 ft (292 m)

Population (2020)
  - Total: 3,063
  - Density: 79.6/sq mi (30.7/km^{2})
- Time zone: UTC-5 (Eastern (EST))
  - Summer (DST): UTC-4 (EDT)
- ZIP code(s): 49221 (Adrian); 49236 (Clinton); 49265 (Onsted); 49286 (Tecumseh); 49287 (Tipton)
- FIPS code: 26-30320
- GNIS feature ID: 1626308
- Website: www.franklintownship.net

Franklin Township is a civil township of Lenawee County in the U.S. state of Michigan. The population was 3,063 at the 2020 census.

== Communities ==
- Evans Lake was a post office here from 1890 until 1900.
- Tipton is an unincorporated community in the township at the junction of M-50 and Tipton Highway at 42°01′00″N 84°03′51″W. The community was founded by the Rev. Henry Tripp in 1831. It was first known as Franklin Center, after Benjamin Franklin (and for whom the township is named). It was renamed Tripp Town and then shortened to Tipton. A post office was opened June 6, 1834, with William Camburn as the first postmaster. The Tipton ZIP code 49287 also serves most of Franklin Township, as well as small areas of northeast Cambridge Township, southwest Manchester Township, and north central Adrian Township.
- The city of Adrian is to the south, and the Adrian ZIP code 49221 also serves portions of southern Franklin Township.
- The village of Clinton is to the east and the Clinton ZIP code 49236 also serves portions of northeastern Franklin Township.
- The village of Onsted is to the west and the Onsted ZIP code 49265 also serves portions of western Franklin Township.
- The city of Tecumseh is to the east, and the Tecumseh ZIP code 49286 also serves portions of eastern Franklin Township.

== Geography ==
According to the United States Census Bureau, the township has a total area of 39.3 square miles (101.8 km^{2}), of which 38.5 square miles (99.7 km^{2}) is land and 0.8 square mile (2.1 km^{2}) (2.11%) is water.

== Demographics ==
As of the census of 2000, there were 2,939 people, 1,071 households, and 846 families residing in the township. The population density was 76.4 inhabitants per square mile (29.5/km^{2}). There were 1,275 housing units at an average density of 33.1 per square mile (12.8/km^{2}). The racial makeup of the township was 98.03% White, 0.07% African American, 0.10% Native American, 0.31% Asian, 0.48% from other races, and 1.02% from two or more races. Hispanic or Latino of any race were 1.09% of the population.

There were 1,071 households, out of which 36.4% had children under the age of 18 living with them, 68.3% were married couples living together, 7.1% had a female householder with no husband present, and 21.0% were non-families. 17.1% of all households were made up of individuals, and 5.5% had someone living alone who was 65 years of age or older. The average household size was 2.74 and the average family size was 3.08.

In the township the population was spread out, with 27.2% under the age of 18, 6.2% from 18 to 24, 30.4% from 25 to 44, 26.9% from 45 to 64, and 9.4% who were 65 years of age or older. The median age was 38 years. For every 100 females, there were 102.0 males. For every 100 females age 18 and over, there were 102.5 males.

The median income for a household in the township was $56,296, and the median income for a family was $61,979. Males had a median income of $47,083 versus $25,691 for females. The per capita income for the township was $24,300. About 1.6% of families and 2.7% of the population were below the poverty line, including 1.7% of those under age 18 and 3.0% of those age 65 or over.

== Gallery ==
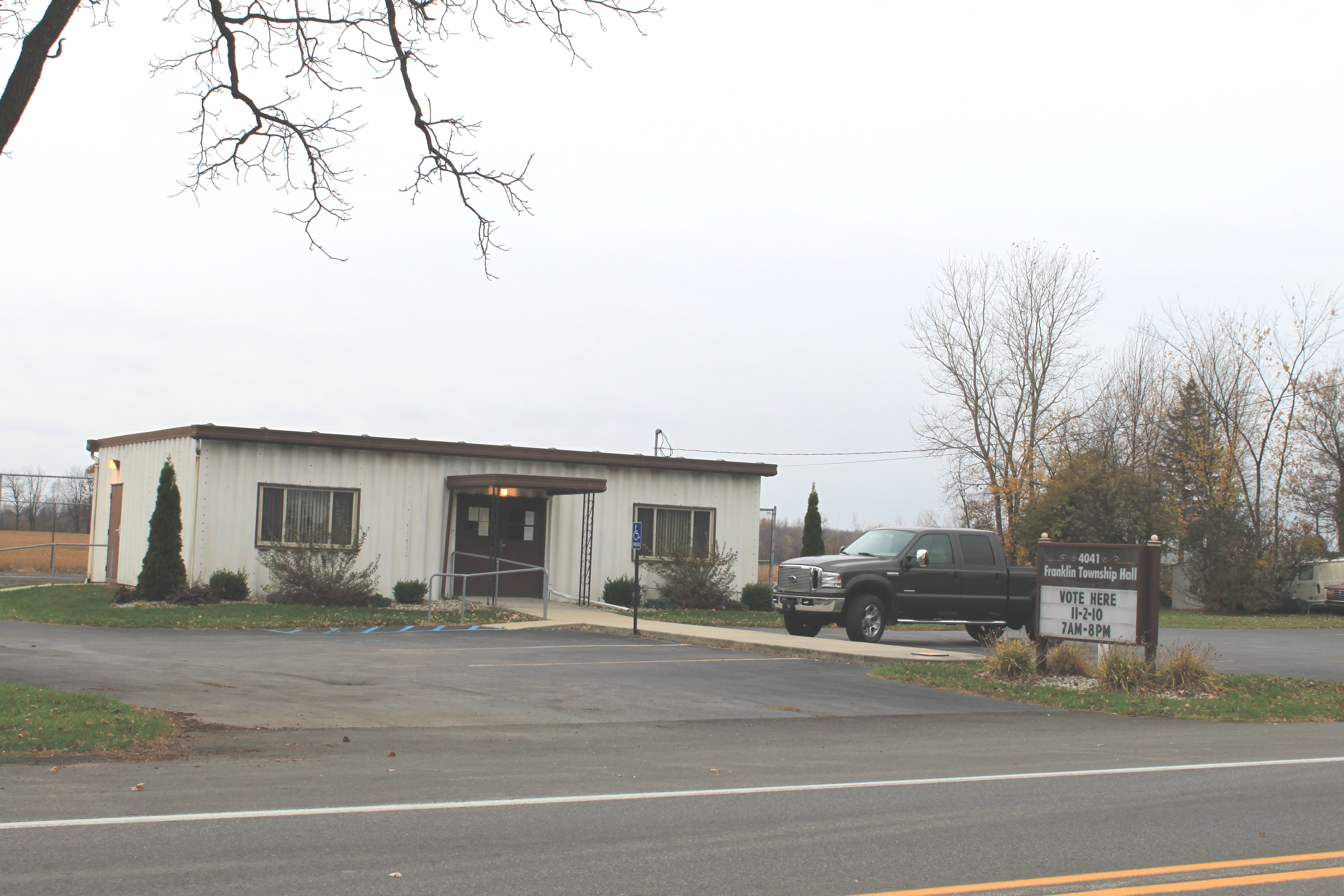
Former Franklin Township Hall

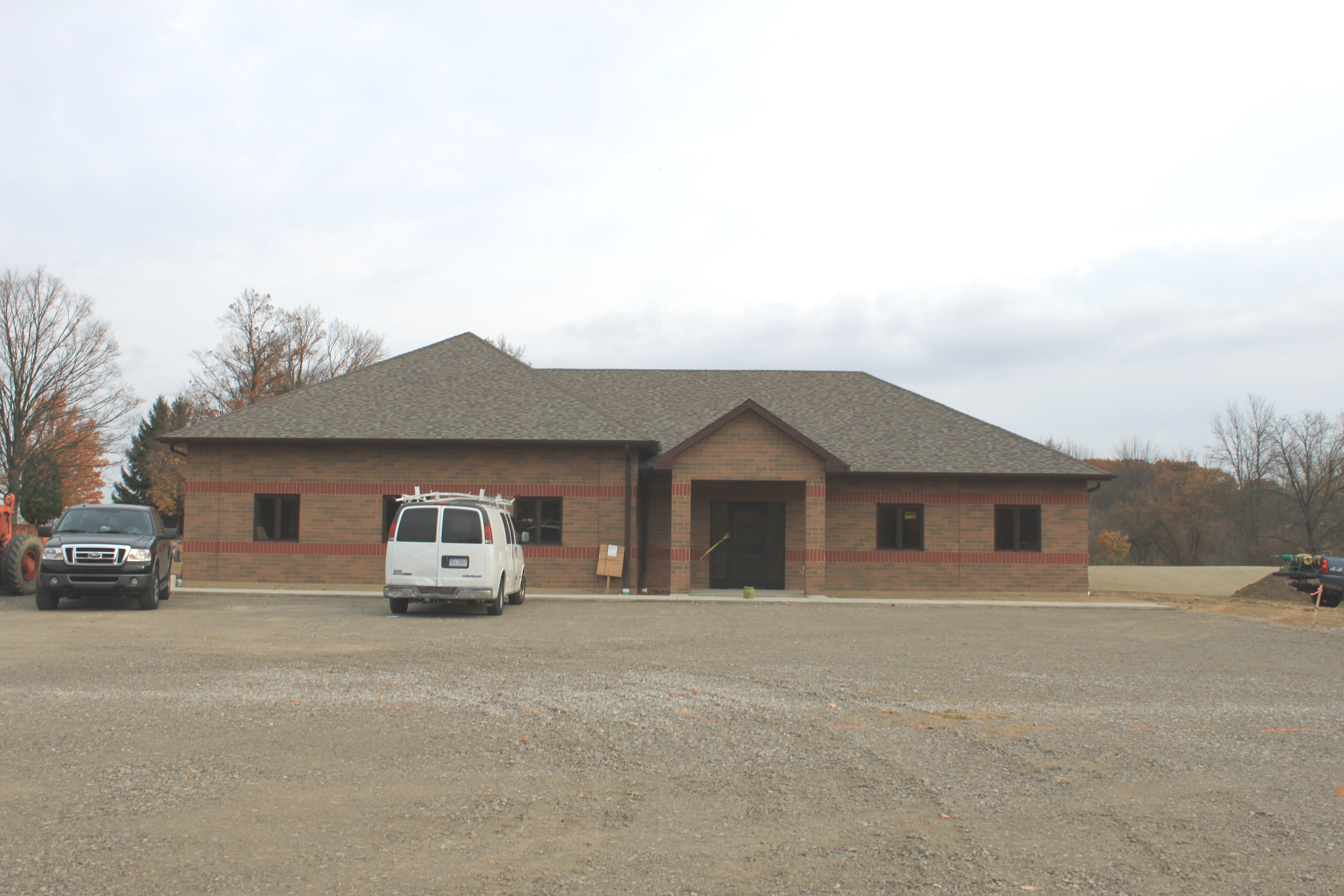
New Township Hall under construction in 2010

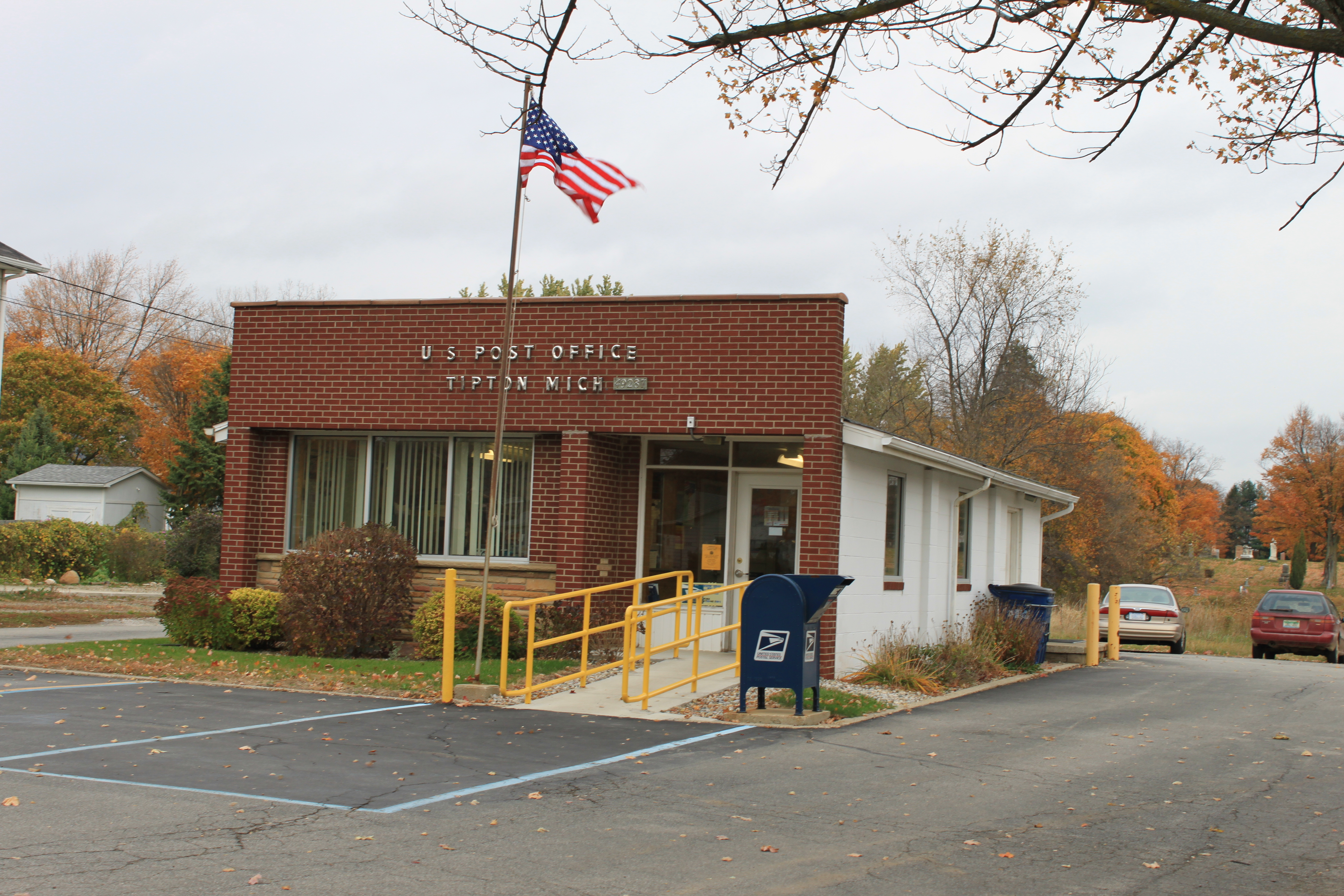
U.S. Post Office in Tipton

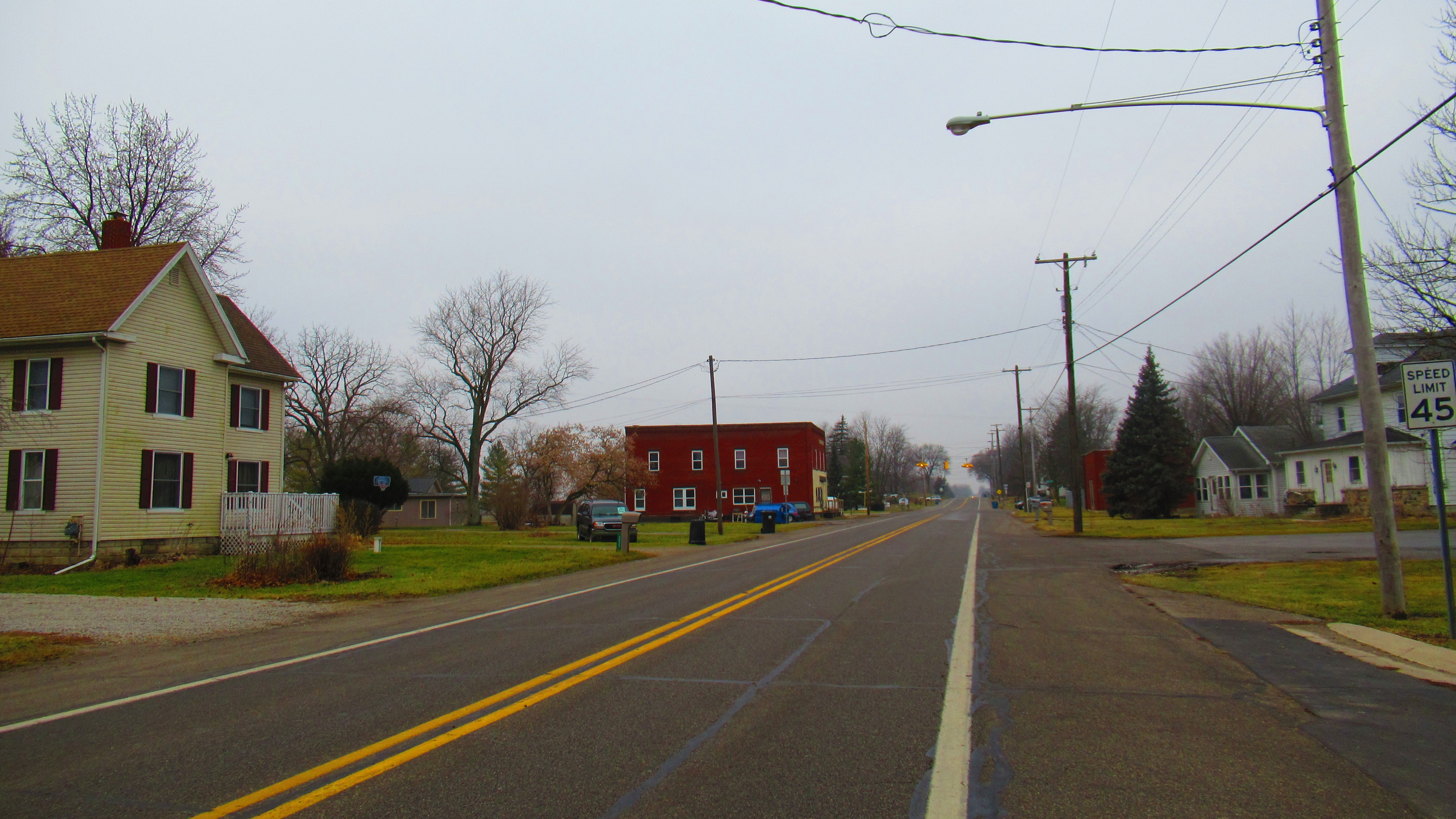
Community of Tipton along M-50

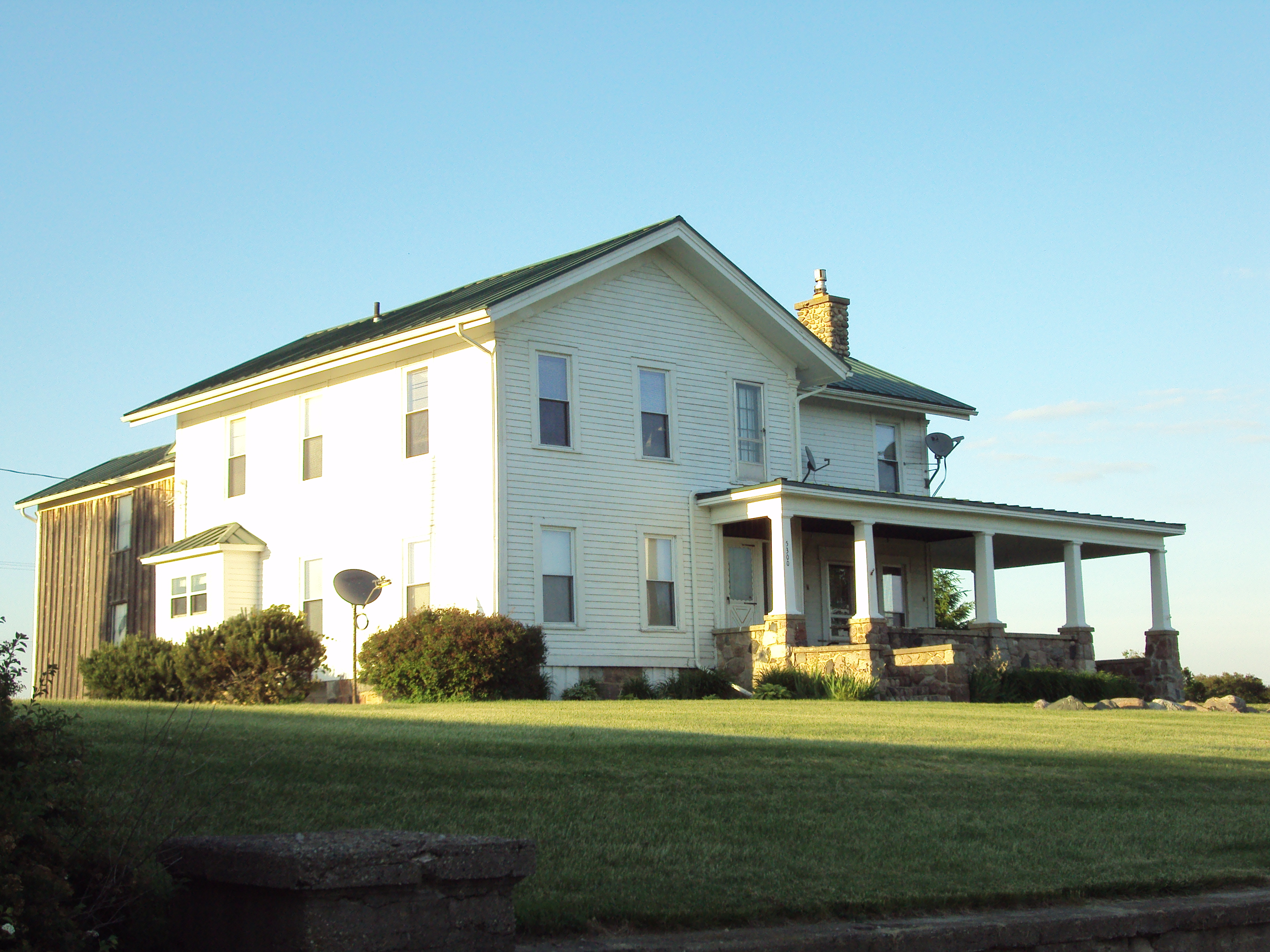
The Keeney Farm

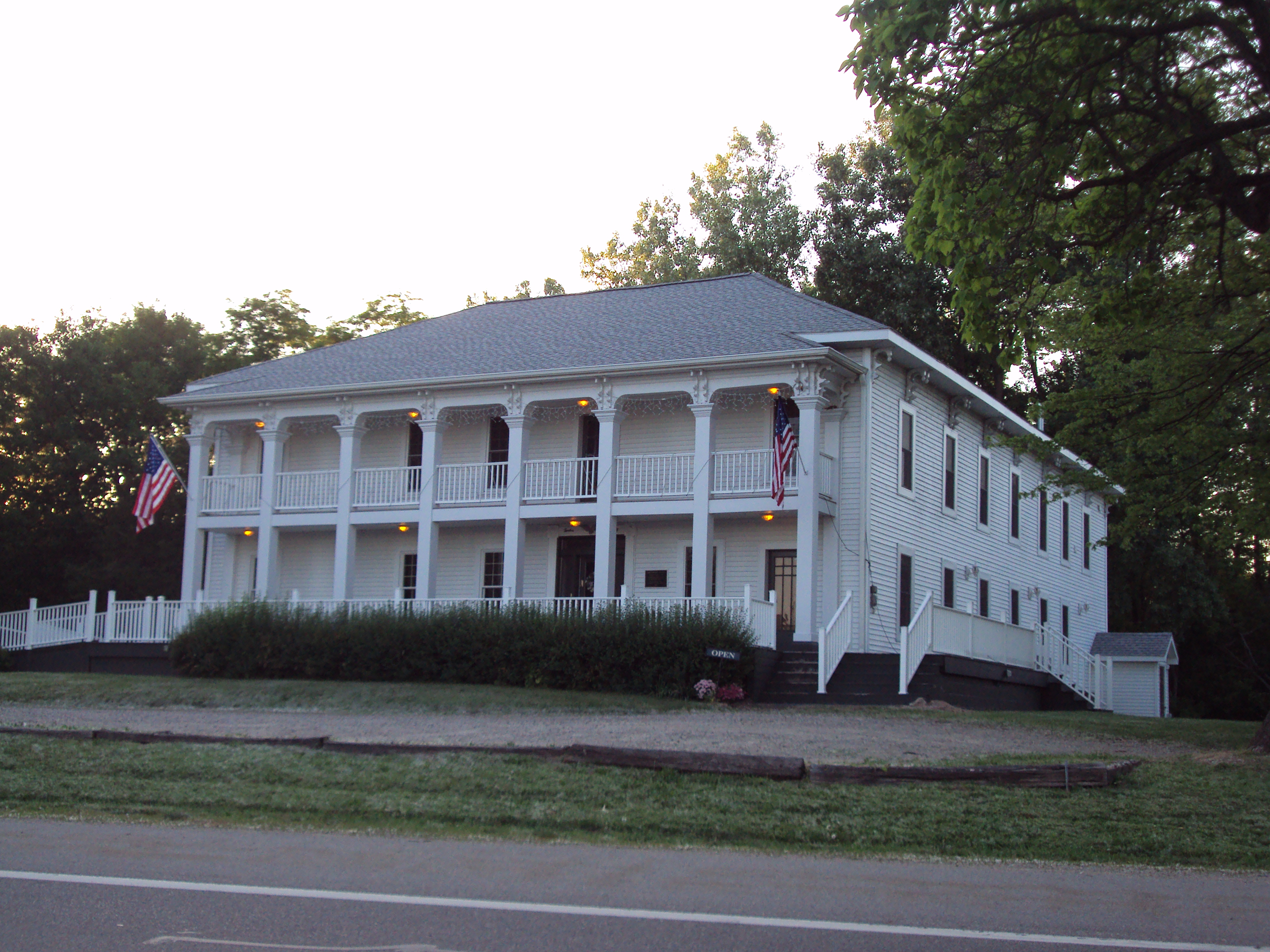
The Davenport House

== Education ==
Portions of Franklin Township are in Tecumseh Public Schools, Clinton Community Schools, and Onsted Community Schools. A small piece of the Adrian City School District extends into the township.

== Notable person ==
- Tim Walberg, U.S. representative, former state state representative (resides in Tipton)

== See also ==
- Disappearance of Dee Ann Warner
