= Madison School District =

Madison School District can refer to:

- Madison Metropolitan School District (Wisconsin)
- Madison School District (Idaho)
- Madison District Public Schools, Metro Detroit, Michigan
- Madison School District (Lenawee County, Michigan)
