= Keeney House =

Keeney House or Keeney Hall may refer to:

(by state then city)

- Keeney Hall, a contributing building in Old Wethersfield Historic District, Wethersfield, Connecticut
- Keeney Memorial Cultural Center, in Old Wethersfield, Connecticut
- Keeney House (Le Roy, New York), NRHP-listed
- John W. Keeney and Erena Alexander Rogers Farm, Franklin Township, Michigan, NRHP-listed
- Keeney Quadrangle, a Brown University building, Providence, Rhode Island
- Keeney House (Ogden, Utah), a historic hotel in Ogden, Utah
