= WABJ =

Coordinates: 41°54′02″N 84°00′51″W

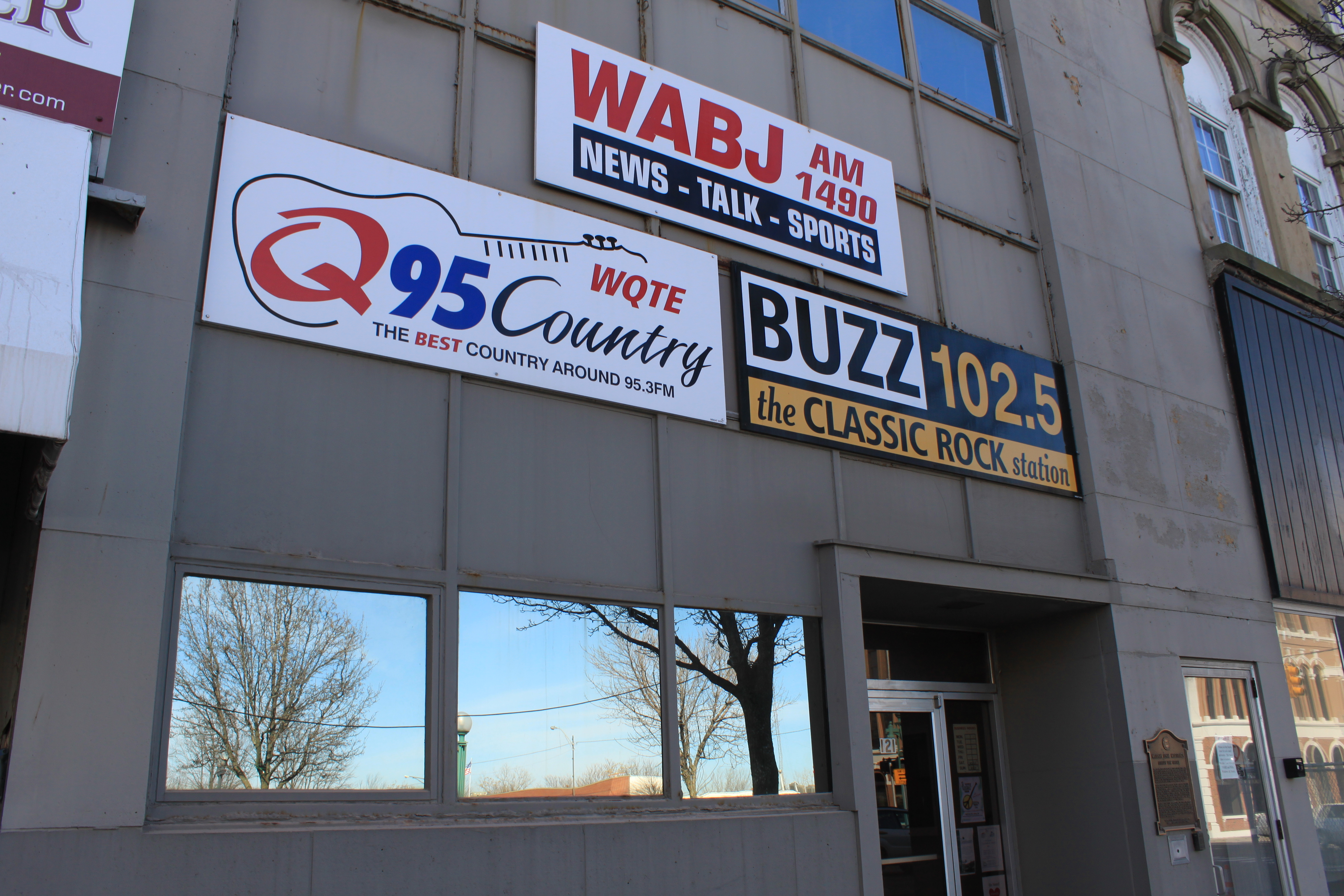
- Adrian, Michigan; United States
- Broadcast area: Lenawee County, Michigan
- Frequency: 1490 kHz

Programming
- Format: Talk radio

Ownership
- Owner: Bud Walters; (Southeast Michigan Media, Inc.)
- Sister stations: WQTE

History
- First air date: November 1946
- Call sign meaning: Adrian Business Journal

Technical information
- Licensing authority: FCC
- Facility ID: 22648
- Class: C
- Power: 1,000 watts

Links
- Public license information: Public file; LMS
- Website: https://www.facebook.com/WABJ1490/

WABJ (1490 AM, "NewsTalk 1490") is a commercial radio station licensed to Adrian, Michigan, United States, and featuring a talk radio format. it is owned by Bud Walters, with the license held by Southeast Michigan Media, Inc. The radio studios and offices are on West Maumee Avenue in Adrian.

WABJ's transmitter is sited on East Siena Heights Drive in Adrian, near Race Track Road and the Lenawee County Fairgrounds.

== History ==
The station signed on in November 1946. In January 1948, the Federal Communications Commission approved the sale of WABJ by Adrian Broadcasting Company to James Gerity Jr.

WABJ has functioned as a full-service station for Adrian and Lenawee County since its founding. Music, adult contemporary or Middle of the Road (MOR), was phased out in the early 1990s in favor of the station's current talk format.

WABJ is noted as a "springboard station" for some of the most well-known names in broadcasting. It has launched the careers of such notables as Phil Donahue, Jerry Keil, Rich Hoffer, Gary Fullhart, Mickey Morgret, Aimee Faycosh, Pyke, Andy Stuart, Fred LeFebvre and Joe Elardo.

On July 21, 2021, it was announced the station's broadcast signal would be suspended effective August 1, 2021, largely due to insufficient financial sustainability. WABJ 1490 was heard back on the air on December 30, 2022.

== Sources ==
- Michiguide.com - WABJ History
