= Davenport House (Franklin Township, Michigan) =

- Davenport Hotel
- U.S. National Register of Historic Places
- Michigan State Historic Site
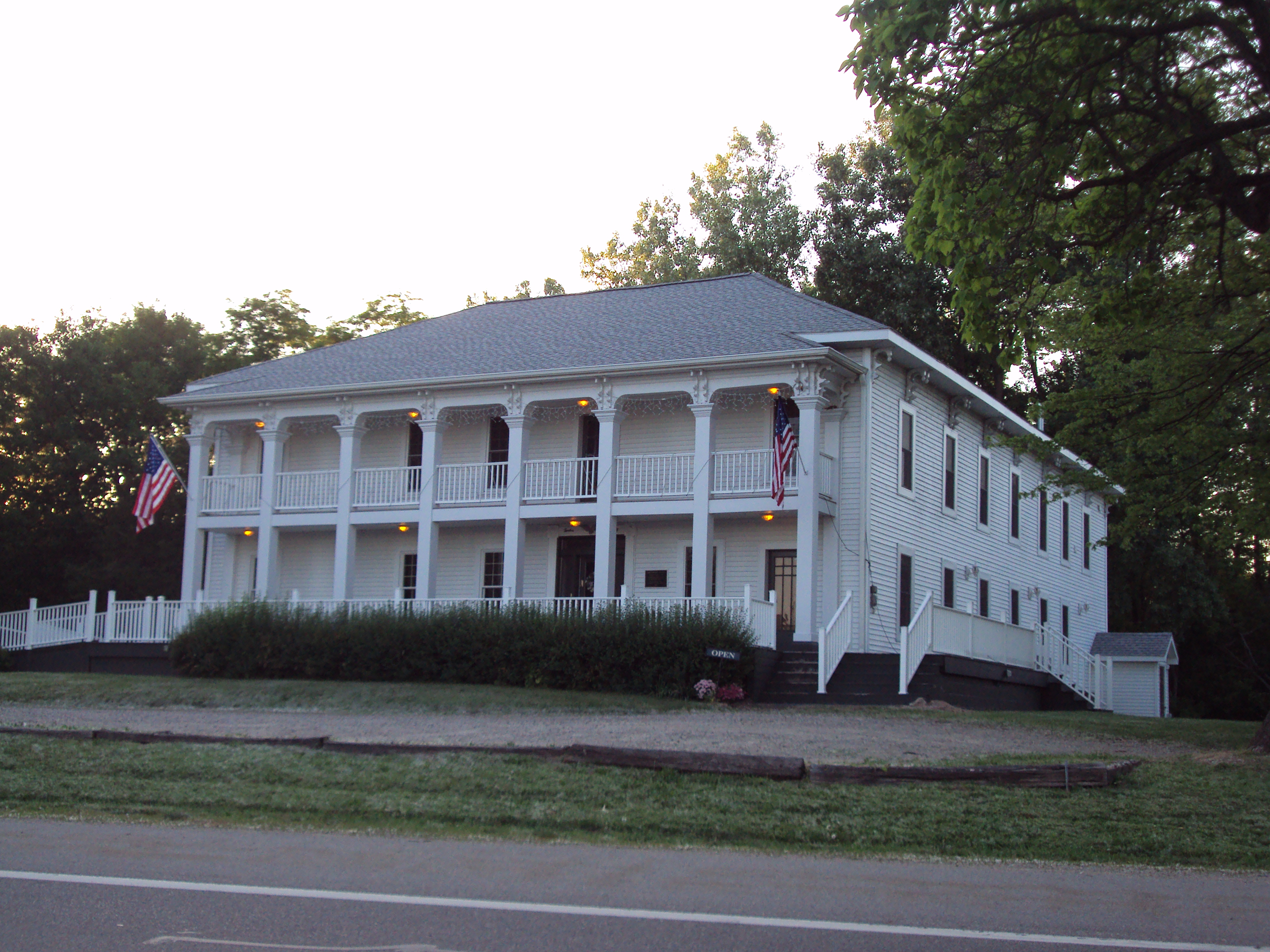

- Location within Michigan Location within the United States
- Interactive map
- Location: 1280 Michigan Avenue; Franklin Township, MI
- Coordinates: 42°03′47″N 84°07′1″W
- Built: c. 1861
- NRHP reference No.: 07000383

Significant dates
- Added to NRHP: May 4, 2007
- Designated MSHS: May 18, 1971

The Bauer Manor, also known as the Davenport House or Davenport Hotel, is a hotel located at 1280 U.S. Route 12 (known locally as Michigan Avenue) near the unincorporated community of Tipton in Franklin Township in northern Lenawee County, Michigan. It was designated as a Michigan State Historic State on May 18, 1971 and listed on the National Register of Historic Places on May 4, 2007.

== History ==
The Chicago Road (now U.S. 12) was built in the late 1820s and early 1830s, and quickly became a prime transportation route. In 1834, Henry W. Sisson built a log tavern at this site along the Chicago Road. In 1839, he sold the tavern and associated property to John Davenport, the owner of a local saw and grist mill. Davenport owned the property until 1864, and at some time during that period constructed the present hotel building, Although the exact date of construction is unknown, it was likely in about 1861.

In 1864, Davenport sold the hotel to Henry Lancaster. Lancaster renamed the hotel the "Lancaster House," and operated it as a hotel and a social center for the local population until 1884, when he moved. He continued to own the property until 1888, when the mortgage was foreclosed. At that time, businessmen John and Edward Smith purchased the hotel, and in 1889 sold it to Edward L. Clapp. Clapp served as the local postmaster, and operated a post office in the hotel from 1890 to 1900. In 1907, Clapp sold the hotel to Charles F. Pitcher, who operated it until his death in 1925. Frank H. Ridley then purchased it, and hired George and Jessie Bauer to manage the establishment.

The late 1920s were a boom period for the Irish Hills area: the Chicago Road was paved in 1926, and the area was touted as a tourist destination. The Bauers had the hotel renovated, enlarging the dining room and updating the decor. Frank Ridley owned the hotel until 1938, then sold it to the Bauers, who renamed in "Bauer Manor." The Bauers retired in 1963, and sold the hotel to Kenneth and Mary Van Doren in 1965. The establishment became primarily a restaurant, still operating under the "Bauer Manor" name. AI and Diane Andrews purchased the hotel in 1979, and the restaurant continued operation until 2003. In the later 2000s, the property was renovated into office space and apartments, and the lower floor housed a realty company.

== Description ==
The Bauer Manor is a broad, two-story wooden Greek Revival structure with a wide hip-roof main mass, a gabled wing extending to the rear from one end, and another rear single-story addition constructed in 1965. The front facade is seven bays wide, with a two-story square-column portico extending across the entire front. Two entrances are in the front. The primary entrance is located near the center, and has a Revival molded trim enframement, sidelights, and a transom. A plainer, secondary entrance is located at one end of the building. Both the front and side facades have double-hung six-over-six windows.

The original interior layout had the main entrance opening into an entry hall containing a staircase. Off the hall was a dining room, two bedrooms, a bar area, and a kitchen behind. The dining room has since been expanded twice: once in the 1920s with the removal of the two bedrooms, and later in the 1960s with the construction of a rear addition. On the second floor, a central hallway leads to the guest rooms. To the rear is a large ballroom. The ballroom has since been subdivided.

== See also ==
- List of United States post offices
