= Madison School District (Lenawee County, Michigan) =

School district in Michigan

Address
- 3498 Treat Highway Adrian, Barry County, Michigan, 49221; United States

District information
- Grades: Pre-Kindergarten-12
- Superintendent: Nick Steinmetz
- Schools: 3
- Budget: $23,601,000 2022-2023 expenditures
- NCES District ID: 2622320

Students and staff
- Students: 1,585 (2024-2025)
- Teachers: 97.4 (on an FTE basis) (2024-2025)
- Staff: 216.24 FTE (2024-2025)
- Student–teacher ratio: 16.27 (2024-2025)

Other information
- Website: www.madisonk12.us

Madison School District is a public school district in Lenawee County, Michigan. It serves parts of Adrian and parts of the townships of Adrian, Madison, and Palmyra.

== History ==
Two of the school districts in Madison Township, District No. 4 and District No. 5, were independent and operated ungraded primary schools prior to 1943. These districts sent their upper grades to Adrian Public Schools. Both overcrowded, their school boards began taking steps to consolidate in October 1943, which would better allocate space in the districts' buildings.

A new Madison school opened at its current site in 1949. By 1956, the district population had grown and was forecasted to grow further. By then the district went to grade nine and continued to send its high school students to the Adrian district. The district requested the advice of Michigan State Normal College's (now known as Eastern Michigan University) public school experts, who investigated the issue and suggested the district consolidate with Adrian's district or form a high school of its own.

District leaders chose to remain independent and voters approved a bond issue to pay for construction of a high school. The new Madison High School opened in fall 1958 as an addition to the 1949 building.

In 2014, the district received a grant from the state of Michigan to experiment with a balanced calendar, in which the in-session school days are more evenly distributed throughout the year, including the summer. As of 2017, about one third of Madison elementary students opted into the balanced calendar. The district no longer uses the balanced calendar.

As of 2025, about half of the students enrolled in the district come from outside district boundaries, primarily from Adrian Public Schools, and attend through Michigan's Schools of Choice program.

== Schools ==
The district operates three schools within a single building at 3498 Treat Highway in Adrian. Madison High School, Madison Middle School, and Madison Elementary are located there and together serve all grades.
