= WQTE =

Radio station in Adrian, Michigan

Coordinates: 41.804°N 84.090°W

- Adrian, Michigan; United States
- Broadcast area: Jackson, Michigan and Toledo, Ohio
- Frequency: 95.3 MHz
- Branding: Q95 Country

Programming
- Format: Country

Ownership
- Owner: Julie Koehn; (Southeast Michigan Media, Inc.)
- Sister stations: WABJ

History
- Former call signs: WABJ-FM
- Call sign meaning: QTE = cutie (meaning of calls when used at AM 560 in Monroe/Detroit)

Technical information
- Licensing authority: FCC
- Facility ID: 22649
- Class: A
- ERP: 3,000 watts
- HAAT: 91 meters (299 ft)

Links
- Public license information: Public file; LMS

WQTE (95.3 FM, "Q-95 Country") is a radio station in Adrian, Michigan, broadcasting a country music format. The station is live and local during the day on weekdays, and airs a satellite format from ABC Radio called "Country Coast-to-Coast" (known on air as "Today's Best Country") the remainder of the time.

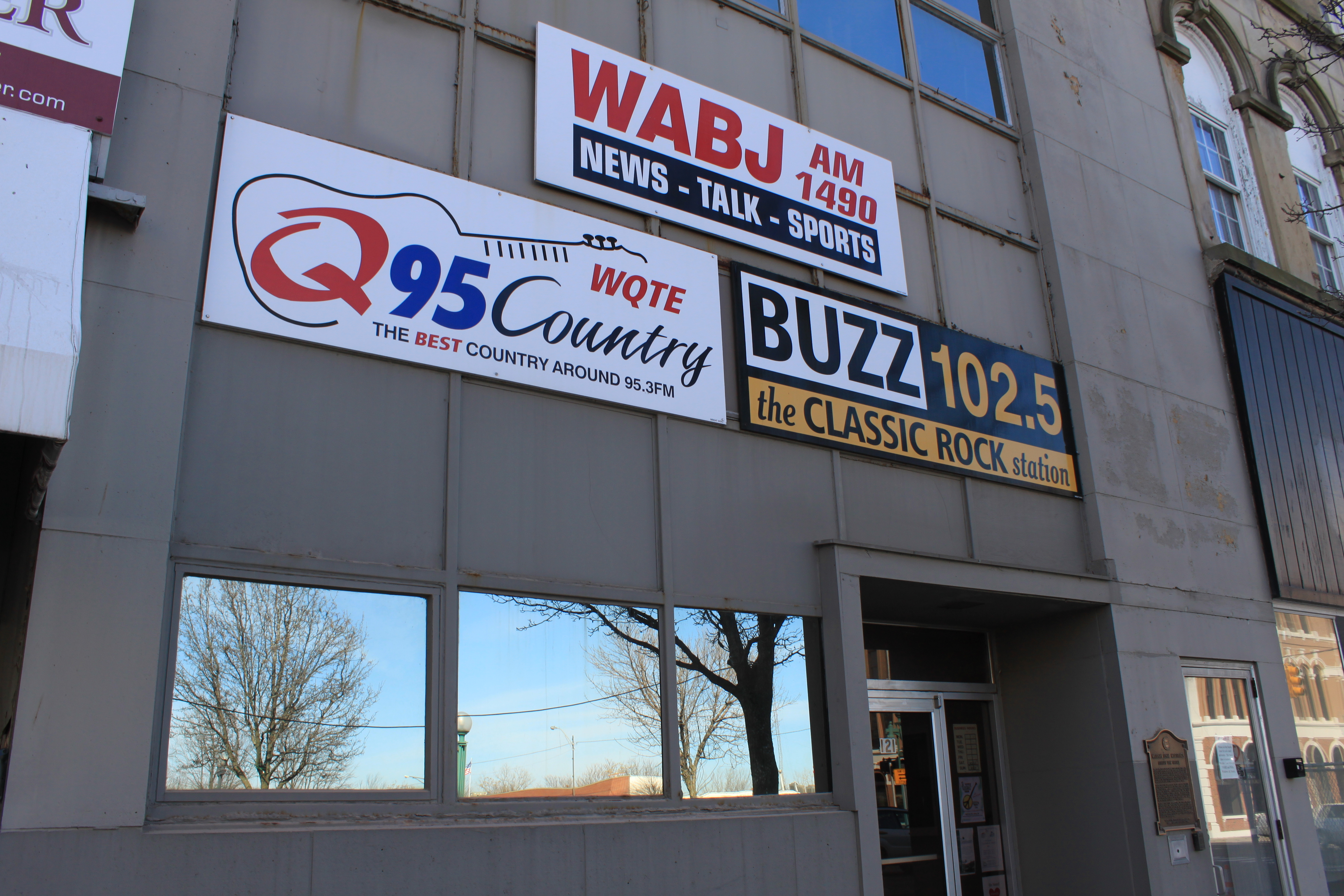
WQTE studios entrance

The station originally signed on as WABJ-FM in 1976, nearly immediately becoming WQTE. The station's original format was beautiful music, changing to country sometime in the early 1980s. The station remains co-owned with WABJ (1490 AM). For several years, WQTE has referred to itself as "Q95 Country," presumably to avoid confusion with adjacent-channel WKQI 95.5 FM in Detroit, which called itself "Q95" for many years and serves the northeastern part of WQTE's listening area.

The WQTE calls were originally used by what is now WRDT AM 560 in Monroe, Michigan from 1959 to 1974 (later WHND and WLLZ).

== Sources ==
- Michiguide.com - WQTE History
