= Disappearance of Dee Ann Warner =

2021 disappearance of 52-year-old Michigan woman

Dee Anna Warner
- Born: Dee Ann Hardy; July 29, 1968
- Disappeared: April 25, 2021 (aged 52); Franklin Township, Lenawee County, Michigan
- Status: Body Discovered August 17, 2024 (Missing for 3 years, 3 months and 24 days)
- Body discovered: Franklin Township, Lenawee County, Michigan
- Height: 5 ft 4 in (1.63 m)
- Spouse: Dale John Warner

Dee Ann Warner was a woman who disappeared from Franklin Township, Michigan, on April 25, 2021, in a suspected murder. On November 22, 2023, her husband, Dale John Warner, was charged with her murder. Her body was discovered by police on August 17, 2024, while executing a search warrant on Dale Warner’s Paragon Road property. The body was discovered in a resealed anhydrous tank, similar to a residential propane storage tank. On March 10, 2026 Warner was found guilty of second degree murder. He was sentenced to 70 years in prison on May 7, 2026.

== Background ==
Dee Warner's daughter, Rikkell Bock, testified that her mother was in an "extremely toxic" relationship with her husband, Dale Warner. Dale allegedly stalked her, put a tracking device on her car, and committed domestic violence. Gregg Hardy, Dee Warner's brother, said he saw the signs his sister was being abused but did not realize it at the time.

== Disappearance ==
Dee Ann disappeared on the night of April 24, 2021. Her phone records, bank account, and social media had no activity after that night. She was never captured on camera leaving the property.

== Investigation ==
At the request of the Lenawee County Sheriff's Office, the Michigan State Police announced on August 9, 2023, that it was taking over the investigation of Dee Ann's disappearance.

== Arrest ==
On November 21, 2023, the Michigan State Police announced that it made an arrest in connection with Warner's murder. Her husband, Dale, was charged with murder and tampering with evidence.

== Media attention ==
Initially, Dee's disappearance received local media attention, particularly from outlets in Lenawee County and the surrounding areas. The case became more widely followed after numerous true crime outlets became interested in the circumstances of her disappearance. NBC's Dateline: Missing in America featured the case on episode 6 of the podcast's first season. On his podcast, The Interview Room, retired homicide detective Chris McDonough interviewed the family's investigative attorney, Billy Little Jr., regarding details of the case.

The case was also featured during the 10th season of Investigation Discovery’s show Disappeared. The episode, titled "Vanished in the Heartland", aired on October 5, 2022.

A subsequent televised feature aired during the ninth season of Investigation Discovery’s People Magazine Investigates in an episode titled “Vanished in the Heartland,” which aired on January 12, 2026 at 9/8c.

== See also ==
- List of people who disappeared mysteriously (2000–present)
