= Madison Charter Township, Michigan =

Madison Township, Michigan
- Charter township
- Charter Township of Madison
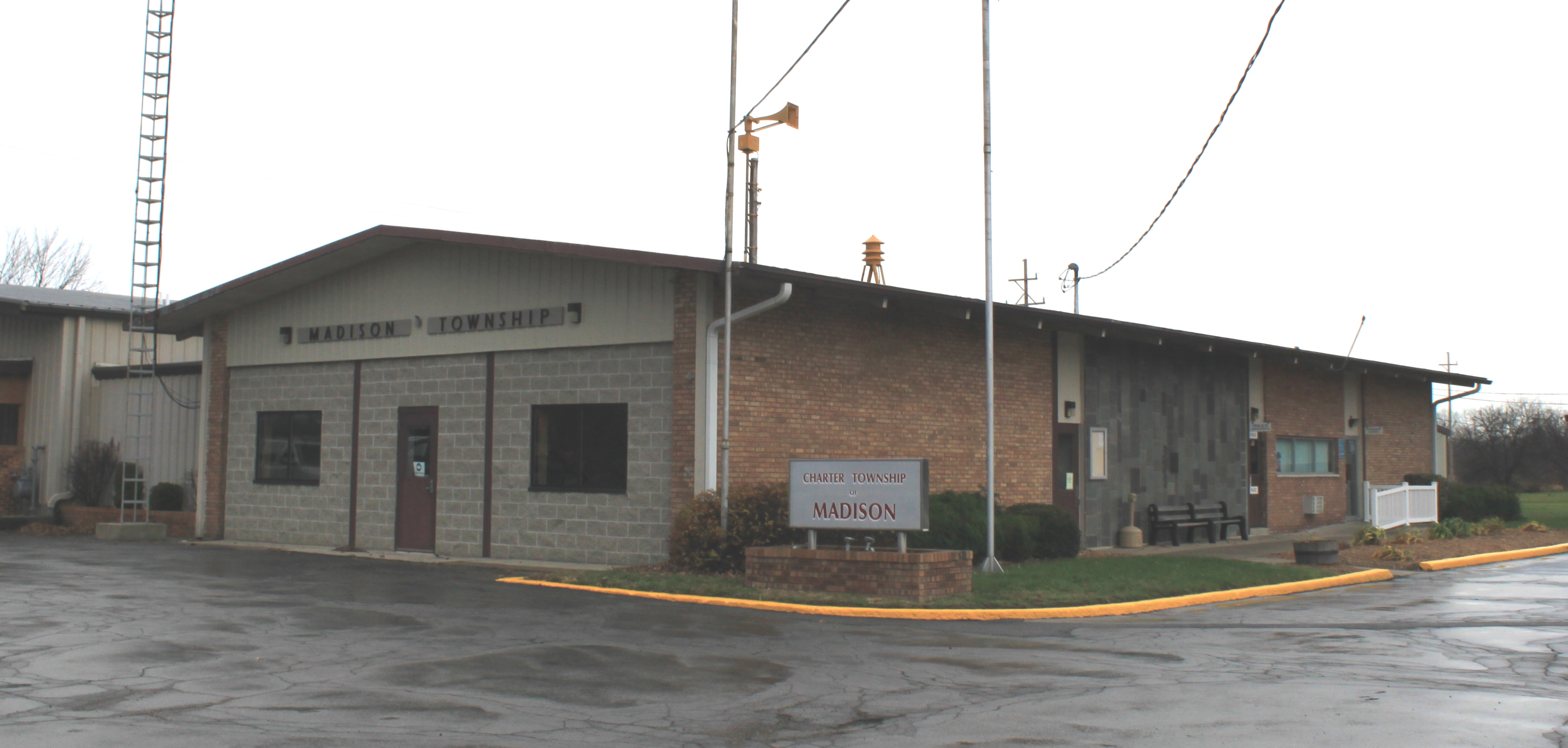
- Madison Township Hall

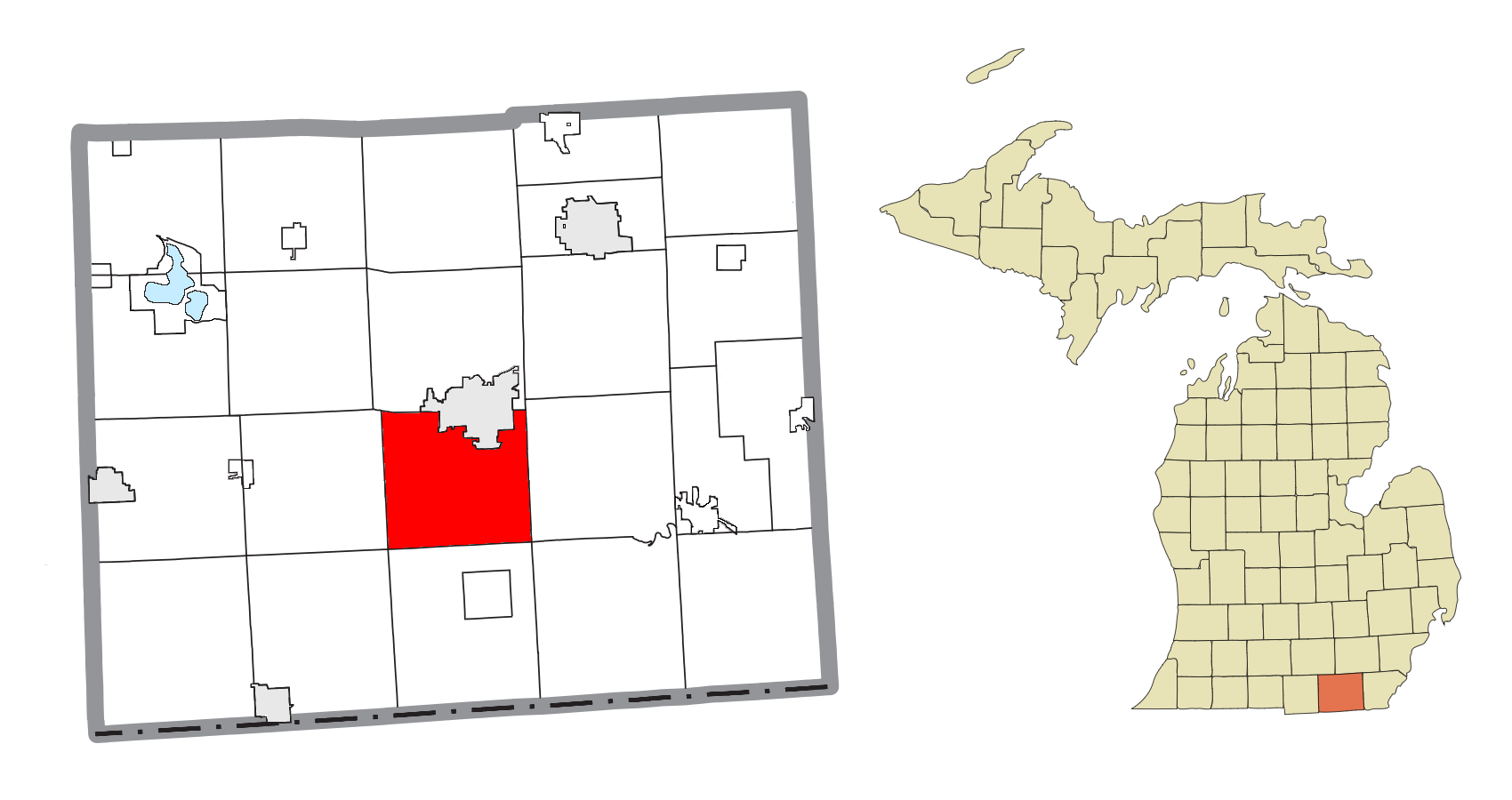
- Location within Lenawee County

- Location within the state of Michigan Location within the United States
- Coordinates: 41°52′02″N 84°03′14″W
- Country: United States
- State: Michigan
- County: Lenawee
- Established: 1834

Government
  - Supervisor: Ryan Rank
  - Clerk: Janet Moden

Area
  - Total: 30.65 sq mi (79.38 km^{2})
  - Land: 30.39 sq mi (78.71 km^{2})
  - Water: 0.26 sq mi (0.67 km^{2})
- Elevation: 781 ft (238 m)

Population (2020)
  - Total: 8,439
  - Density: 277.7/sq mi (107.2/km^{2})
- Time zone: UTC-5 (Eastern (EST))
  - Summer (DST): UTC-4 (EDT)
- ZIP code(s): 49221 (Adrian); 49279 (Sand Creek)
- Area code: 517
- FIPS code: 26-50540
- GNIS feature ID: 1626662
- Website: Official website

Madison Charter Township is a charter township of Lenawee County in the U.S. state of Michigan. The population was 8,439 at the 2020 census.

== Communities ==
- Gorman is a former settlement located within the township. A post office operated here from March 3, 1893 until October 13, 1902.
- Madison Center is an unincorporated community located in the center of the township at 41°51′36″N 84°02′33″W.
- Sand Creek is an unincorporated community located in the southwest portion of the township at 41°49′33″N 84°06′05″W. Joshua and Rebecca Thurber received a land grant in 1820 and settled in the area. The Wabash Railroad opened a station here in 1881, and a post office began operating on September 27, 1881. The post office as named Thurber after the first settlers. The name was changed to Sand Creek on March 5, 1891 and then respelled as Sandcreek on June 11, 1894. It was named after a nearby creek. The post office was respelled back to Sand Creek in 1957. The post office remains in operation and uses the 49279 ZIP Code, which serves a portion of Madison Township and the surrounding area.

== Geography ==
According to the U.S. Census Bureau, the township has a total area of 30.65 square miles (79.38 km^{2}), of which 30.39 square miles (78.71 km^{2}) is land and 0.26 square miles (0.67 km^{2}) (0.85%) is water.

The south branch of the River Raisin flows through the township. The Lenawee County Airport is located in the northern portion of the township near the city of Adrian.

=== Major highways ===
- US 223 runs briefly through the northeast corner of the township.
- M-34 (West Beecher Road) runs briefly through the northwest corner of the township.
- M-52 (North Adrian Highway) runs north–south through the center the township.

== Demographics ==
As of the census of 2000, there were 8,200 people, 2,191 households, and 1,676 families residing in the township. The population density was 267.4 inhabitants per square mile (103.2/km^{2}). There were 2,399 housing units at an average density of 78.2 per square mile (30.2/km^{2}). The racial makeup of the township was 81.63% White, 13.05% African American, 0.27% Native American, 0.35% Asian, 3.33% from other races, and 1.37% from two or more races. Hispanic or Latino of any race were 7.35% of the population.

There were 2,191 households, out of which 34.7% had children under the age of 18 living with them, 61.5% were married couples living together, 11.1% had a female householder with no husband present, and 23.5% were non-families. 19.5% of all households were made up of individuals, and 7.7% had someone living alone who was 65 years of age or older. The average household size was 2.70 and the average family size was 3.07.

In the township the population was spread out, with 20.3% under the age of 18, 8.6% from 18 to 24, 38.4% from 25 to 44, 22.6% from 45 to 64, and 10.2% who were 65 years of age or older. The median age was 36 years. For every 100 females, there were 165.8 males. For every 100 females age 18 and over, there were 185.8 males.

The median income for a household in the township was $47,114, and the median income for a family was $52,642. Males had a median income of $33,941 versus $23,103 for females. The per capita income for the township was $17,749. About 1.0% of families and 2.1% of the population were below the poverty line, including 2.1% of those under age 18 and 3.1% of those age 65 or over.

== Education ==
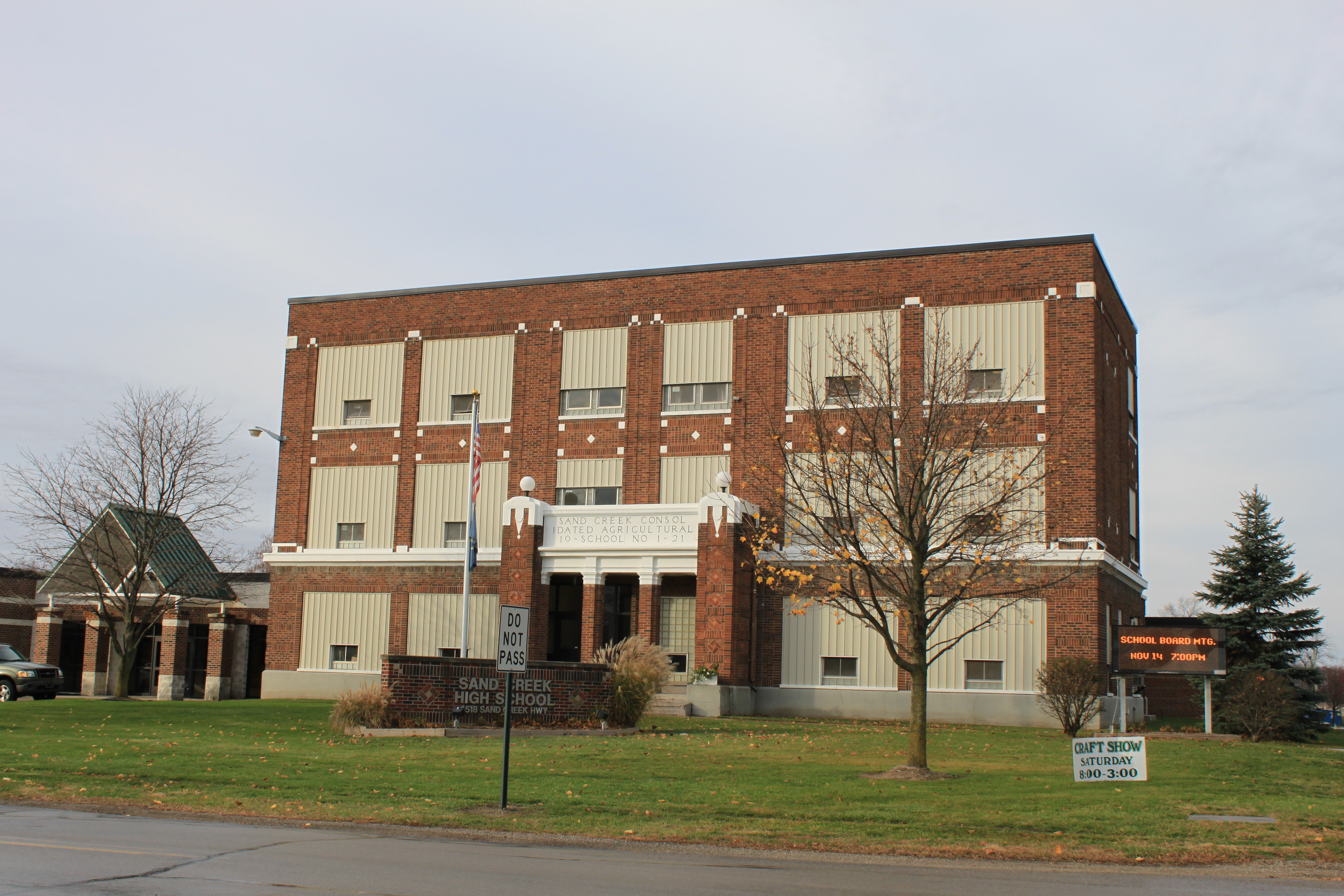
Sand Creek High School

Madison Township is served by three separate public school districts. The northeast portion of the township is served by Madison School District. The south and southwestern portion of the township is served by Sand Creek Community Schools, and the northwest corner is served by Adrian Public Schools.
