= Lenawee (car) =

Defunct American motor vehicle manufacturer

The Lenawee was a Veteran era American automobile manufactured by the Church Manufacturing Company of Adrian, Lenawee County, Michigan in 1904.

== History ==
After Church's successful production of the Murray runabout in 1902 and 1903, they produced the Lenawee. The Lenawee was to be the technically advanced successor to the Murray, designed by Andrew Bachle who would become well known as the long-term engineer at Paige-Detroit. The Lenawee was a left hand drive, five-seat tonneau body automobile, with a horizontal single-cylinder engine located beneath the front seat. They were priced at $1,000, equivalent to $35,833 in 2025. Church discontinued Lenawee production after about 15 were built, and returned to the production of wire fences. One Lenawee is extant.

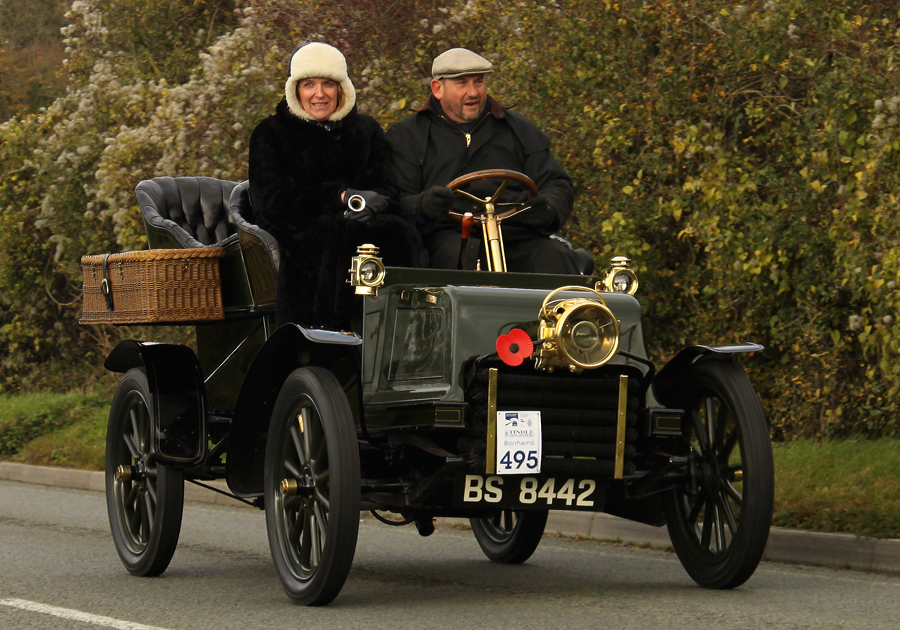
1904 Lenawee 9 1/2 HP Rear-entrance tonneau automobile

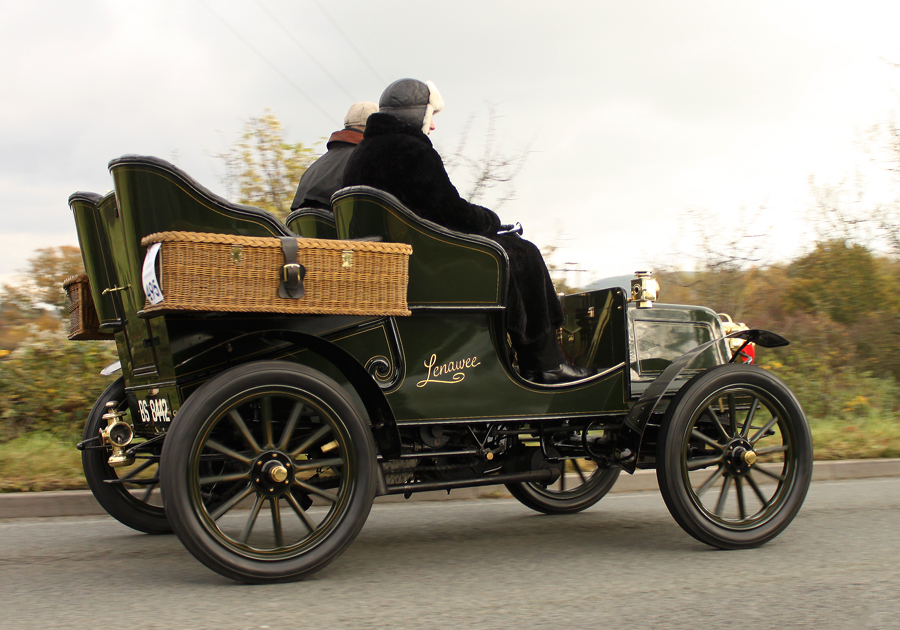
1904 Lenawee 9 1/2 HP Rear entrance tonneau automobile
