= Adrian Public Schools =

School district in Michigan, United States

Location
- 785 Riverside Ave; Adrian, MI 49221

District information
- Type: Public
- Grades: Pre-K–12
- Established: 1828; 198 years ago
- Superintendent: Nate Parker
- Schools: 7
- Budget: $52,329,000 2022–2023 expenditures
- NCES District ID: 2601950

Students and staff
- Students: 2,662 (2024–2025)
- Teachers: 184.85 (FTE) (2024-2025)
- Staff: 411.28 FTE (2024-2025)
- Student–teacher ratio: 14.43 (2024-2025)
- Athletic conference: South Eastern Conference
- District mascot: The Maples
- Colors: Royal blue and White

Other information
- Website: www.adrianmaples.com

Adrian Public Schools is a public school district in Lenawee County, Michigan. It serves Adrian and parts of Adrian Township, Dover Township, Franklin Township, Madison Township, Palmyra Township, Raisin Township, and Rome Township.

== History ==
=== Establishment ===
In 1828, a school committee authorized the building of a combination school and meeting house at the corner of South Main and Winter Street.

From 1828 to 1849, four school districts developed in Adrian. Each had its own building and equipment, hired its own teachers, and levied a tax on heads of families. The tax was based on the length of time the children in the family attended school. In 1848 a temporary board of education was formed to combine the four districts. Funds were raised and the cornerstone for a new building was laid on July 8, 1851. Known as the Union school building it opened for classes on September 13, 1852. A report to the Superintendent of Public Instruction noted that the three-story building often contained over 500 students.

The rapid growth of the school population in the late 1850s made it necessary to build four new school buildings:

- 1857 East Branch for primary grades on East Maumee Street
- 1859 South Branch for primary grades at South Main and Beecher streets
- 1860 West Branch for primary and grammar grades at West Maumee and McKenzie streets.
- 1861 North Branch for primary and grammar grades at Hunt and Broad streets.

In 1859 a resolution was passed to establish a free school paid for by levying a property tax on constituents within the district. The resolution came ten years before the State of Michigan declared the common schools in the state free.

On the morning of August 10, 1866, the Union school building burned down. Faced with full buildings at the branch schools, the district rented a number of buildings in the city to hold the 500 students that had been displaced by the fire. Property was purchased at the corner of Division and Church streets to build a new Central building. The new building was designed to accommodate 1000 students, and cost $70,000. On April 23, 1869 Central was opened.

=== Expansion ===
By 1901, the building became so crowded that it was necessary to rent a room from St. John's Lutheran School. The next year a committee visited Detroit and Kalamazoo to observe various types of architecture and furnishings. In June 1907 a contract was given for a new building near Center Street. The school opened in September of that year and was named in honor of Thomas Jefferson.

During the same time plans for a new high school were also being drawn up. The project originally had a $50,000 that grew to $70,000 and finally reached $90,000. On November 1, 1907, the cornerstone for the new building was laid. By September 30, 1908, classes began in the new facility.

In 1919, the Branch Schools were renamed after the three martyred presidents and the first president. East became McKinley (and later Old McKinley); North, Washington; West, Lincoln; South, Garfield. All of the buildings (except Washington and Jefferson) were torn down and replaced in different locations.

On October 2, 1925, an authorization to build three elementary schools was passed. Two of the new buildings were to have two kindergarten rooms, twelve classrooms, and an auditorium. The third building was to have eight classrooms, two kindergarten rooms, and a combined gymnasium and auditorium.

Garfield was dedicated on November 30, 1927, followed by Lincoln, December 2, 1927, and McKinley, December 6, 1927.

In November 1952, a bond issue was passed for construction of two new elementary schools and an addition to McKinley. In a break from tradition of naming elementary buildings after presidents the northwest building was named "Effie Alexander Building". Alexander had begun her career in 1919 and was longtime supervisor of elementary education. The building planned for the south side of Adrian was named in honor of Earl C. Michener. He was a 30-year veteran of the United States Congress.

A $4.5 million bond issue passed on February 16, 1956, to build a new high school building. Construction began on a site located between Loveland Road and Riverside Ave. By September 1959 the building was ready for students. In August of that same year the 90-year-old Central Building was torn down.

In 2007, a new Performing Arts Center was opened at Adrian High School.

== Schools ==
- Adrian High School
- Springbrook Middle School
- Alexander Elementary School
- Lincoln Elementary School
- Michener Elementary School
- Prairie Elementary School
