= John W. and Erena Alexander Rogers Keeney Farm =

Historic house in Michigan, United States

- John W. Keeney and Erena Alexander Rogers Farm
- U.S. National Register of Historic Places
- U.S. Historic district
- Michigan State Historic Site
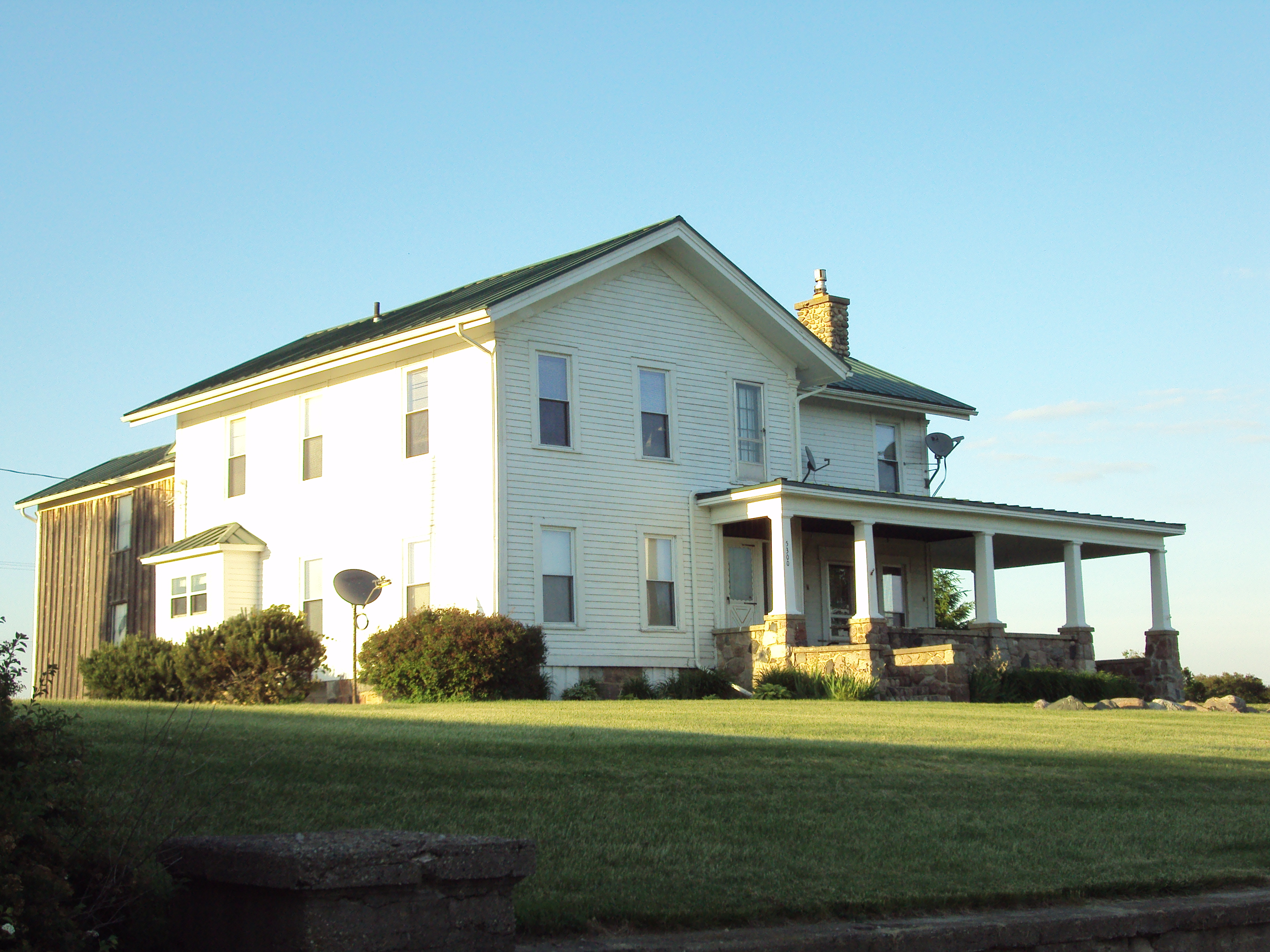

- Location within Michigan Location within the United States
- Interactive map
- Location: 5300 Monroe Street; Franklin Township, Michigan
- Coordinates: 42°01′26″N 84°05′19″W
- Area: 256 acres (104 ha)
- Built: 1835; 1865–1868 (farmhouse)
- Built by: Riley Butrick
- NRHP reference No.: 01001020
- Added to NRHP: September 24, 2001

The John W. Keeney and Erena Alexander Rogers Farm, commonly known simply as the Keeney Farm, is a historic district located at 5300 Monroe Street (M-50) in Franklin Township in north-central Lenawee County, Michigan. It was designated as a Michigan Historic Site and added to the National Register of Historic Places on September 24, 2001. The apple orchard has been continuously operating since 1875, and is one of the oldest such orchards in Lenawee County.

== History ==
Jonathan B. Keeney was born in Lyme, Connecticut in 1815, and he purchased the land on which this farm stands in 1835. In 1846, he sold the land to his brother John W. Keeney, who was born in 1810 in New London, Connecticut. In about 1865, John hired local builder Riley Butrick to construct the farmhouse. In about 1875, John's son Joseph Keeney planted the first apple orchard on the property. Joseph was disinterested in the business management of the farm, preferring horticultural pursuits, so he left the management to his sister Emma and his three children: Frank, John R., and Ruth Keeney.

John R. Keeney was the driving force behind the farm management. He was born in 1882 and later moved the Chicago to become a salesman. In 1916, he returned to the farm and introduced a substantial amount of new innovation to the farming process. The farm became one of the largest producers of fruit in the area, and he installed cold storage barns in 1922. In 1923, he married opera performer Dorothy Bladon Elton, and the couple renovated the farmhouse in 1926.

Refrigeration units were installed in the 1930s, and the farm grew Christmas trees, eventually instituting a "pick your own" sales model. Some of the landscape features surrounding the house, including the retaining wall along M-50, were built from 1926 to 1950. Frank Perry died early, John R. Keeney bought out his sister Ruth for ownership of the property in 1963. The farm passed in trust to his sons, John William Keeney and Frank Perry Keeney. In 1980, John William became sole owner of the farm.

== Description ==
The farm consists of 256 acres (104 ha), which includes the farmhouse, fields, woodlands, a pond, and an apple orchard. The majority of the property — all but 10 acres (4 ha) — has been owned by the Keeney family since it was first settled in 1835. The farmhouse stands on a small hill, and a fieldstone-trimmed concrete retaining wall runs in front of it.

The house is a two-story Upright and Wing structure with a fieldstone foundation and clapboard siding. Traces of Greek Revival details remain, including narrow corner pilasters, the wide frieze band below the cornices, and the side and transom lights framing the front entrance. The upright portion of the house is three bays wide with a shallow pitched roof. The wing section is three bays wide on the ground floor and two on the second; it also has a shallow roof.
