= Adrian, Michigan =

- City
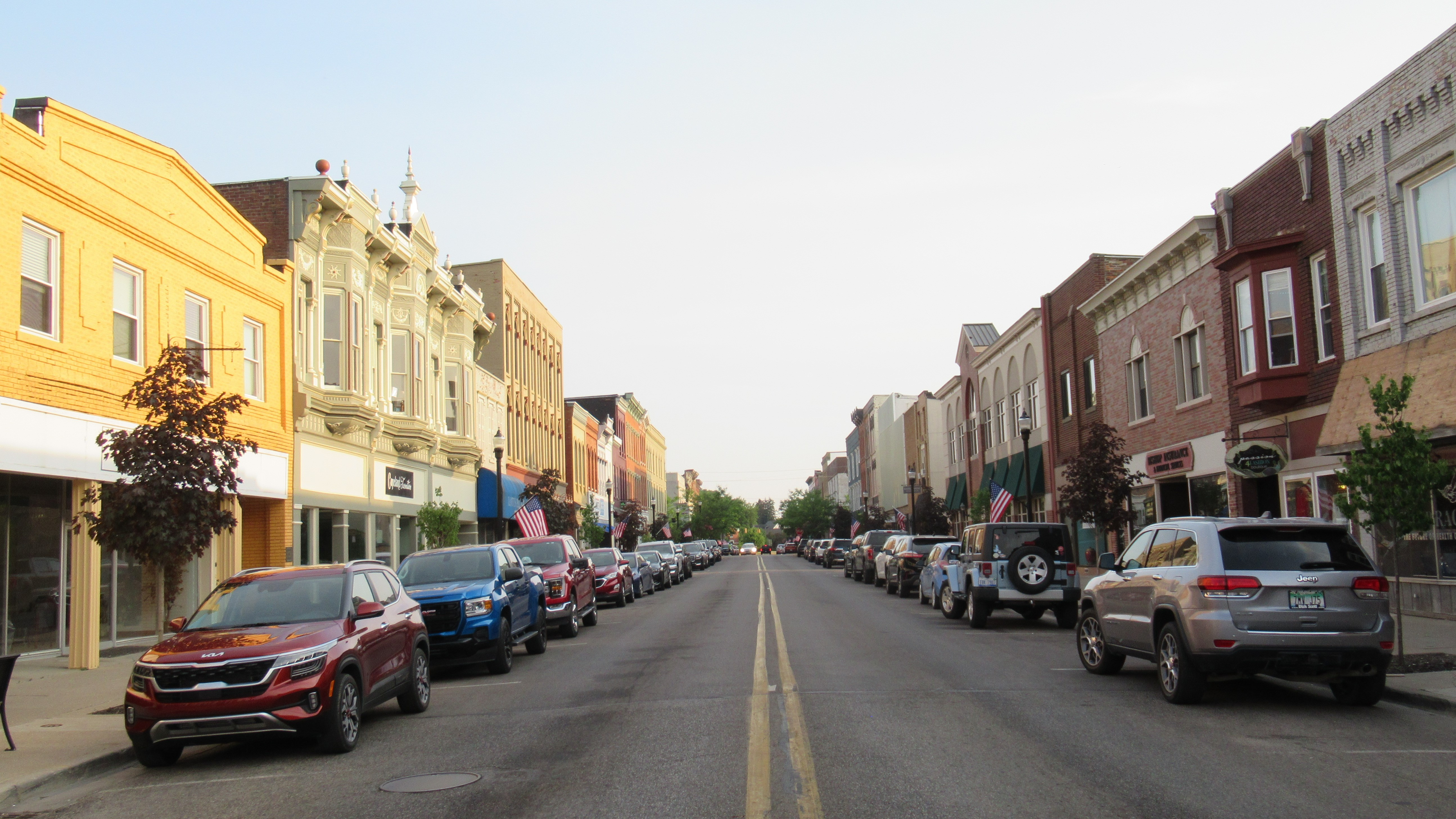
- Downtown Adrian along Main Street (2023)

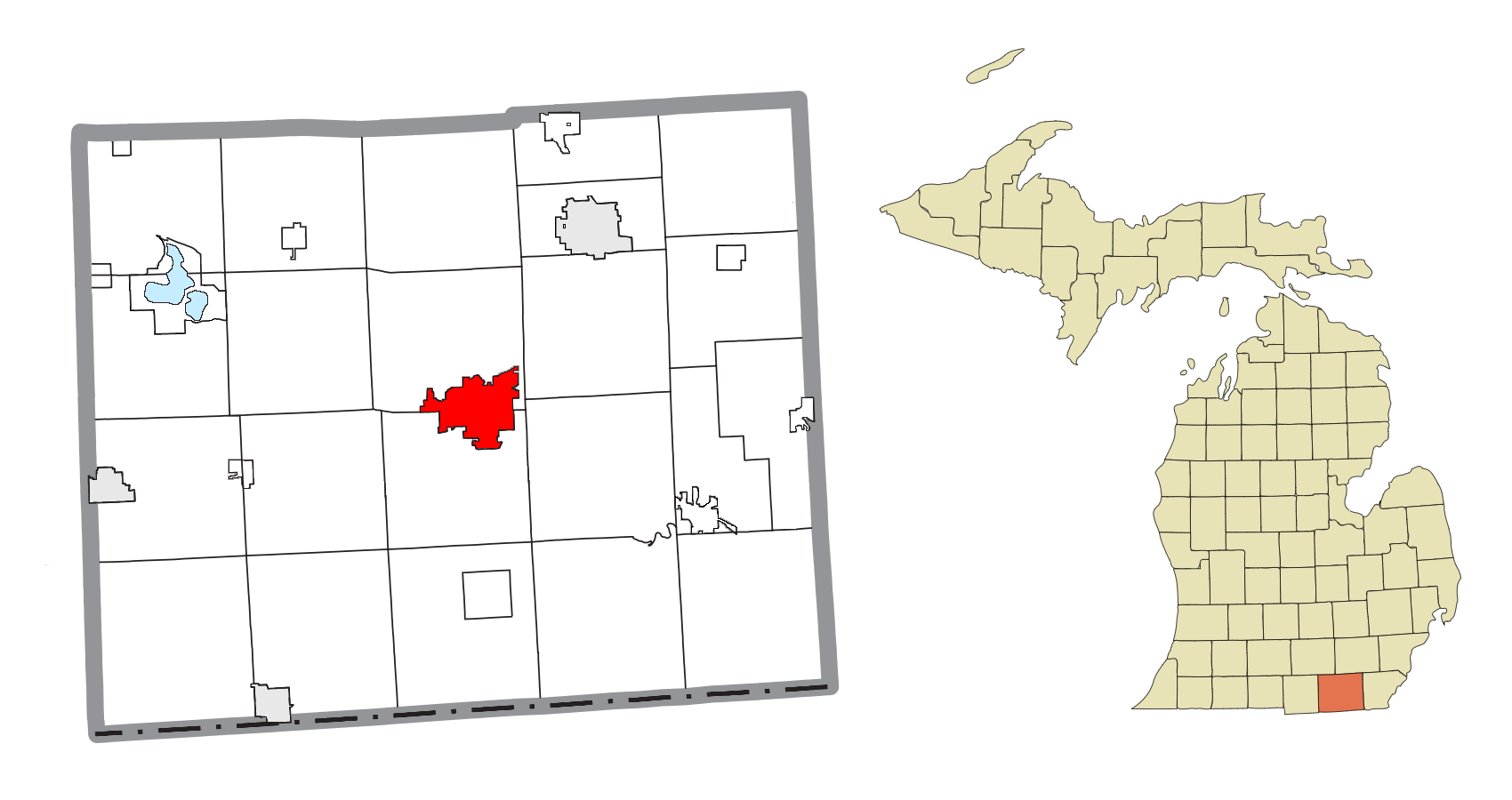
- Location within Lenawee County

- Location in Michigan Location in the United States
- Coordinates: 41°53′47″N 84°02′16″W
- Country: United States
- State: Michigan
- County: Lenawee
- Founded: June 18, 1826
- Incorporated: March 28, 1836 (village); January 31, 1853 (city)
- Founder: Addison Comstock

Government
  - Type: City commission
  - Mayor: Angela Sword Heath

Area
  - Total: 8.15 sq mi (21.12 km^{2})
  - Land: 8.01 sq mi (20.74 km^{2})
  - Water: 0.15 sq mi (0.38 km^{2})
- Elevation: 790 ft (240 m)

Population (2020)
  - Total: 20,645
  - Density: 2,578.3/sq mi (995.49/km^{2})
- Time zone: UTC-5 (Eastern (EST))
  - Summer (DST): UTC-4 (EDT)
- ZIP code(s): 49221
- Area code: 517
- FIPS code: 26-00440
- GNIS feature ID: 0619846
- Website: Official website

Adrian is a city in the U.S. state of Michigan and the county seat of Lenawee County. The population was 20,645 at the 2020 census. Adrian lies in Michigan's 5th congressional district. The city has a significant student population, because it is home to Adrian College.

== History ==
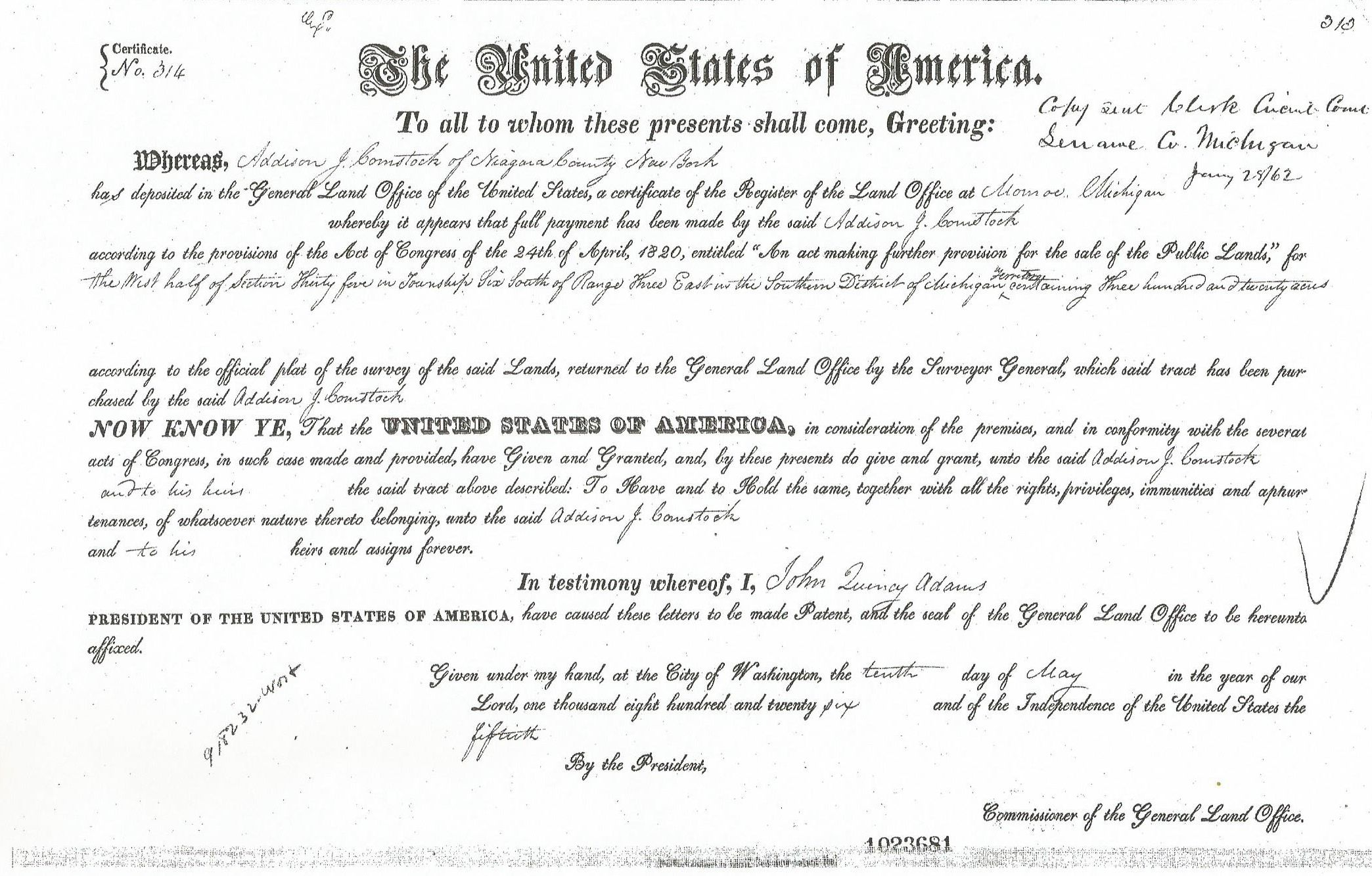
A copy of the original land purchase by Addison Comstock for what would become the City of Adrian, dated 10 May 1826

Adrian was founded on June 18, 1826, by Addison Comstock. The original name for the village was Logan, but was changed soon after to Adrian, perhaps in reference to the Roman emperor Hadrian. The first operating railroad in Michigan was a horse-drawn train running between Adrian and Toledo in 1836. Adrian grew quickly, with the sixth largest population in the state when Michigan was admitted to the Union in 1837, and the third largest population in the state by 1860. Adrian was incorporated as a village on March 28, 1836, then as a city on January 31, 1853.

=== Underground Railroad ===
Evangelical and Hicksite Quakers in Southeast Michigan founded the first congregation of Quakers in Michigan in 1831. They also created a network of Underground Railroad stations in the Raisin River Valley. Daniel Smith was the first leader of the Raisin Valley Friends Meeting House. His daughter, Laura Smith Haviland became one of the most prominent equal rights activists and Underground Railroad operators in the nation. Elizabeth Margaret Chandler established the Logan Female Anti-Slavery Society in October 1832. Chandler’s society preceded the Female Anti-Slavery Society in Philadelphia and the Michigan statewide organization. The Adrian-Tecumseh Underground Railroad network was established by a Baptist minister in northern Lenawee County.

=== Late 1800s and 1900s ===
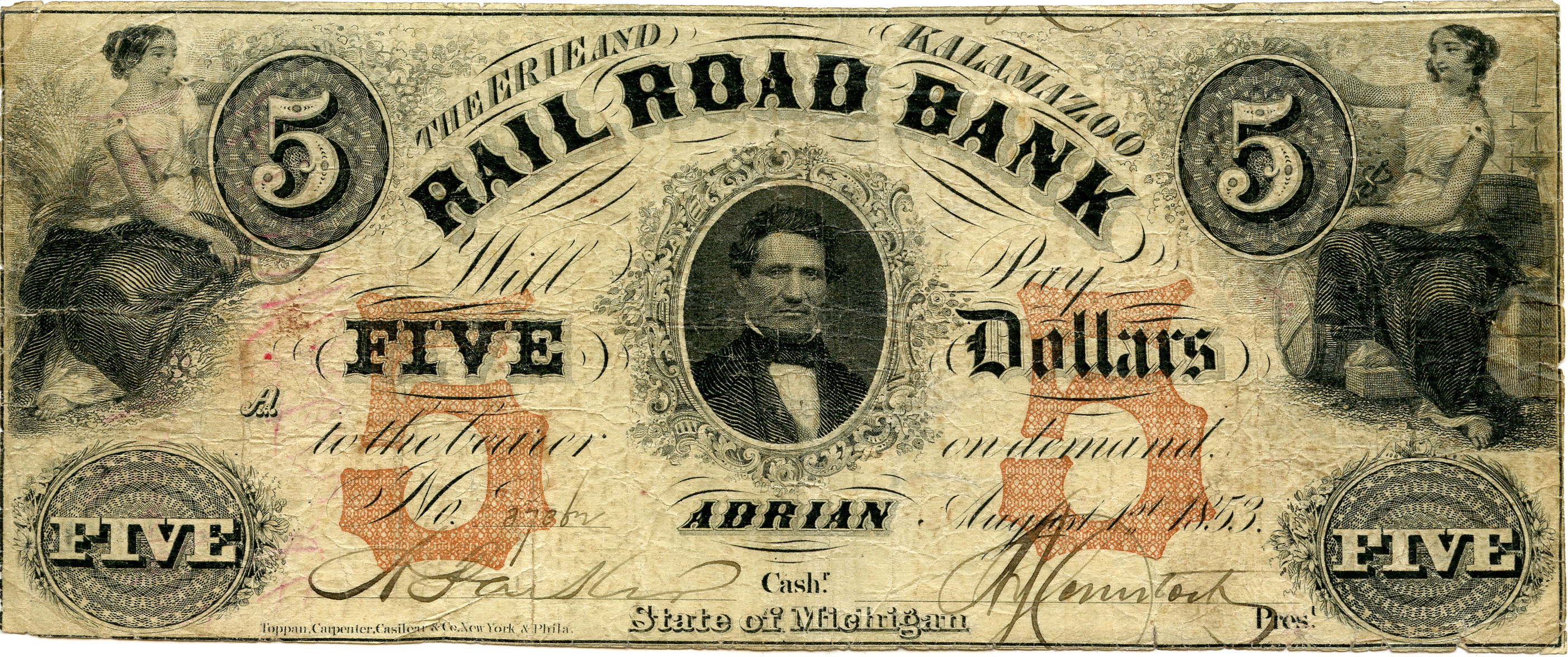
The Erie & Kalamazoo Rail Road Bank was chartered by the Territory of Michigan and opened in the village of Adrian in 1835.

The only remaining piece of the Bank of Pennsylvania— one of the stone pillars — was moved to Adrian, Michigan and erected as the Civil War Memorial in commemoration of those in Adrian who died in the American Civil War.

In the late 19th century through early 20th century Adrian was known as the "fence capital of the world," when J. Wallace Page invented the first successful wire fence. Adrian became known worldwide as a fencing manufacturing hub and its fences were shipped as far as New York, Berlin, Asia, and Africa. The company sponsored the highly successful Page Fence Giants black baseball team.

Adrian was an early auto manufacturing hub. One of the first motor vehicles, the Lion automobile, was created in Adrian. Between 1900 and 1912, three major car models were manufactured in Adrian; in addition to the Lion the Murry Motor Car and Lenawee Car were made by the Church Manufacturing Company in Adrian. The area was poised to be a world center until bad financial decisions at Church Manufacturing Company and a 1912 plant fire at Lion Automobile led to the demise of both companies.

Throughout the 1900s Adrian continued to grow, doubling in size, but as a slower rate than Michigan as a whole (which tripled in size).

== Geography ==
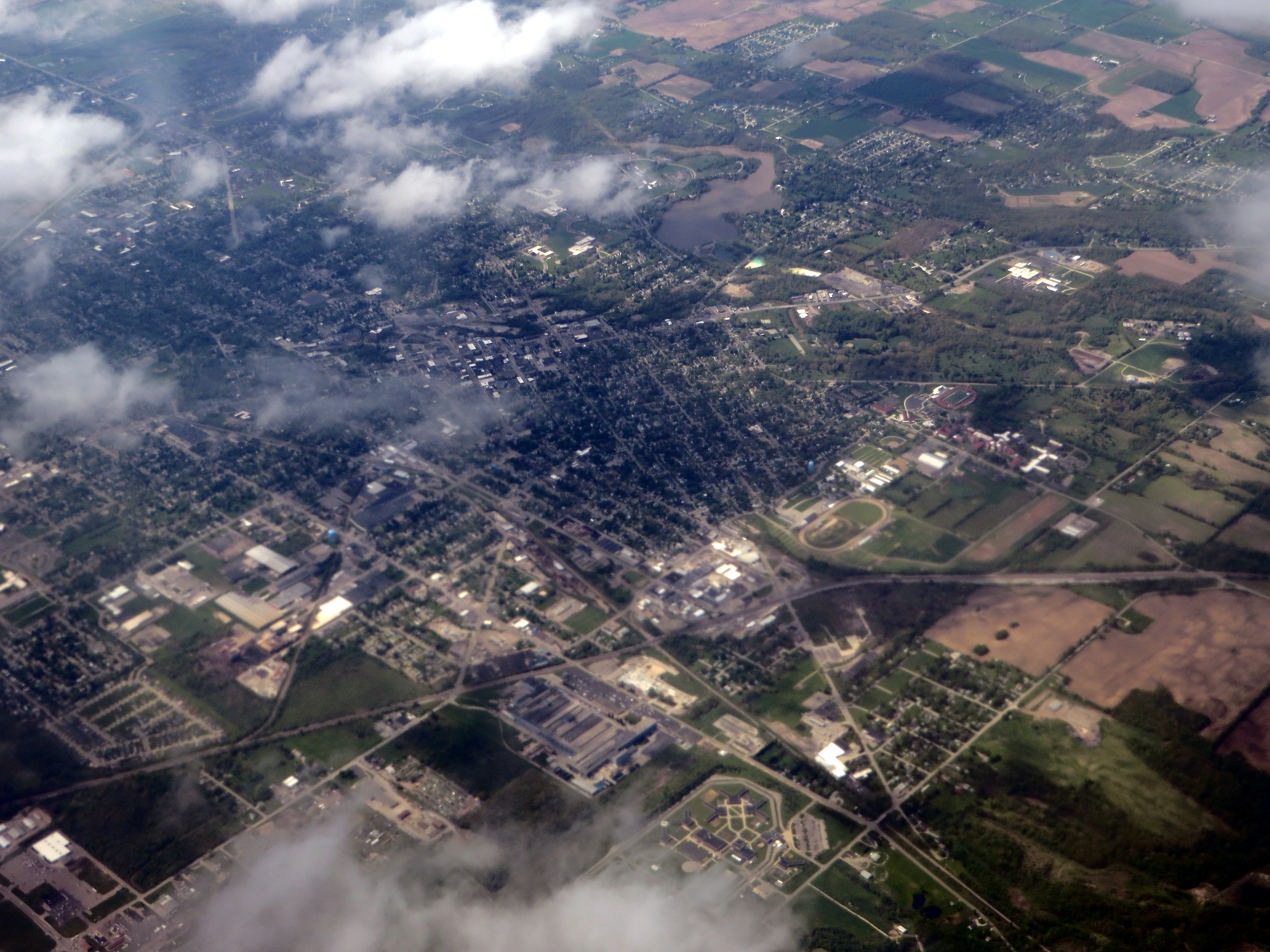
Aerial photo of Adrian, 2014

Adrian is approximately 30 miles (48 km) southwest of Ann Arbor, 30 miles (48 km) southeast of Jackson, and 30 miles (48 km) northwest of Toledo, Ohio. A portion of the city is on the border between Adrian Township and Madison Charter Township, although the city is politically independent of both. The city's urban area extends beyond the city limits into both of those townships as well as into nearby Raisin Township and Palmyra Township.

According to the United States Census Bureau, the city has a total area of 8.10 square miles (20.98 km^{2}), of which 7.95 square miles (20.59 km^{2}) is land and 0.15 square miles (0.39 km^{2}) is water.

The town is approximately 15 miles (24 km) southeast of the Irish Hills area of Michigan, an area known for its many lakes and rolling hills, and home to the Irish Famine Memorial and Michigan International Speedway. Many town residents take advantage of this area for boating and recreation. Devils Lake, Round Lake, Posey Lake and Wamplers Lake are popular weekend destinations within a few miles.

=== Climate ===
Climate data for Adrian 2 NNE, Michigan (1991–2020 normals, extremes 1887–present)
Month	Jan	Feb	Mar	Apr	May	Jun	Jul	Aug	Sep	Oct	Nov	Dec	Year
Record high °F (°C)	68 (20)	70 (21)	85 (29)	92 (33)	99 (37)	106 (41)	108 (42)	107 (42)	104 (40)	91 (33)	80 (27)	69 (21)	108 (42)
Mean daily maximum °F (°C)	33.3 (0.7)	36.4 (2.4)	46.9 (8.3)	59.9 (15.5)	71.8 (22.1)	81.0 (27.2)	84.7 (29.3)	82.5 (28.1)	75.9 (24.4)	63.1 (17.3)	49.2 (9.6)	37.9 (3.3)	60.2 (15.7)
Daily mean °F (°C)	25.1 (−3.8)	27.2 (−2.7)	36.4 (2.4)	48.0 (8.9)	59.2 (15.1)	68.8 (20.4)	72.5 (22.5)	70.7 (21.5)	63.5 (17.5)	51.6 (10.9)	39.8 (4.3)	30.3 (−0.9)	49.4 (9.7)
Mean daily minimum °F (°C)	16.9 (−8.4)	18.0 (−7.8)	25.9 (−3.4)	36.1 (2.3)	46.7 (8.2)	56.5 (13.6)	60.3 (15.7)	58.8 (14.9)	51.0 (10.6)	40.2 (4.6)	30.5 (−0.8)	22.6 (−5.2)	38.6 (3.7)
Record low °F (°C)	−26 (−32)	−24 (−31)	−8 (−22)	5 (−15)	20 (−7)	33 (1)	41 (5)	32 (0)	26 (−3)	15 (−9)	−5 (−21)	−17 (−27)	−26 (−32)
Average precipitation inches (mm)	2.24 (57)	1.99 (51)	2.49 (63)	3.49 (89)	3.99 (101)	4.10 (104)	3.40 (86)	3.63 (92)	3.29 (84)	2.95 (75)	2.82 (72)	2.29 (58)	36.68 (932)
Average snowfall inches (cm)	9.0 (23)	5.8 (15)	4.1 (10)	1.0 (2.5)	0.0 (0.0)	0.0 (0.0)	0.0 (0.0)	0.0 (0.0)	0.0 (0.0)	0.0 (0.0)	1.3 (3.3)	4.8 (12)	26.0 (66)
Average precipitation days (≥ 0.01 in)	11.7	9.0	10.4	11.8	12.4	10.0	9.4	9.5	9.4	10.8	10.2	10.8	125.4
Average snowy days (≥ 0.1 in)	6.5	5.5	2.4	0.4	0.0	0.0	0.0	0.0	0.0	0.0	1.1	4.5	20.4
Source: NOAA

== Demographics ==
Historical population
Census	Pop.	Note	%±
1850	2,219		—
1860	6,213		180.0%
1870	8,438		35.8%
1880	7,849		−7.0%
1890	8,756		11.6%
1900	9,654		10.3%
1910	10,763		11.5%
1920	11,878		10.4%
1930	13,064		10.0%
1940	14,230		8.9%
1950	18,393		29.3%
1960	20,347		10.6%
1970	20,382		0.2%
1980	21,276		4.4%
1990	22,097		3.9%
2000	21,574		−2.4%
2010	21,133		−2.0%
2020	20,645		−2.3%
U.S. Decennial Census

=== Racial and ethnic composition ===
Adrian city, Michigan – Racial and ethnic composition Note: the US Census treats Hispanic/Latino as an ethnic category. This table excludes Latinos from the racial categories and assigns them to a separate category. Hispanics/Latinos may be of any race.
Race / Ethnicity (NH = Non-Hispanic)	Pop 2000	Pop 2010	Pop 2020	% 2000	% 2010	% 2020
White alone (NH)	16,582	15,548	14,478	76.86%	73.57%	70.13%
Black or African American alone (NH)	722	809	858	3.35%	3.83%	4.16%
Native American or Alaska Native alone (NH)	77	81	99	0.36%	0.38%	0.48%
Asian alone (NH)	178	187	158	0.83%	0.88%	0.77%
Native Hawaiian or Pacific Islander alone (NH)	3	2	1	0.01%	0.01%	0.00%
Other race alone (NH)	28	17	69	0.13%	0.08%	0.33%
Mixed race or Multiracial (NH)	319	506	984	1.48%	2.39%	4.77%
Hispanic or Latino (any race)	3,665	3,983	3,998	16.99%	18.85%	19.37%
Total	21,574	21,133	20,645	100.00%	100.00%	100.00%

=== 2020 census ===
As of the 2020 census, Adrian had a population of 20,645. The median age was 34.3 years. 21.8% of residents were under the age of 18 and 18.0% of residents were 65 years of age or older. For every 100 females there were 90.5 males, and for every 100 females age 18 and over there were 86.4 males age 18 and over.

99.9% of residents lived in urban areas, while 0.1% lived in rural areas.

There were 7,893 households in Adrian, of which 27.3% had children under the age of 18 living in them. Of all households, 31.6% were married-couple households, 22.1% were households with a male householder and no spouse or partner present, and 36.7% were households with a female householder and no spouse or partner present. About 37.2% of all households were made up of individuals and 15.7% had someone living alone who was 65 years of age or older.

There were 9,019 housing units, of which 12.5% were vacant. The homeowner vacancy rate was 2.7% and the rental vacancy rate was 8.3%.

Racial composition as of the 2020 census
Race	Number	Percent
White	16,099	78.0%
Black or African American	985	4.8%
American Indian and Alaska Native	157	0.8%
Asian	168	0.8%
Native Hawaiian and Other Pacific Islander	3	0.0%
Some other race	1,155	5.6%
Two or more races	2,078	10.1%

=== 2010 census ===
As of the census of 2010, there were 21,133 people, 7,831 households, and 4,531 families living in the city. The population density was 2,658.2 inhabitants per square mile (1,026.3/km^{2}). There were 8,977 housing units at an average density of 1,129.2 per square mile (436.0/km^{2}). The racial makeup of the city was 84.1% White, 4.4% African American, 0.6% Native American, 0.9% Asian, 5.9% from other races, and 4.0% from two or more races. Hispanic or Latino residents of any race were 18.8% of the population.

There were 7,831 households, of which 31.7% had children under the age of 18 living with them, 35.8% were married couples living together, 16.7% had a female householder with no husband present, 5.3% had a male householder with no wife present, and 42.1% were non-families. 34.7% of all households were made up of individuals, and 12.3% had someone living alone who was 65 years of age or older. The average household size was 2.37 and the average family size was 3.06.

The median age in the city was 32.5 years. 23% of residents were under the age of 18; 17.2% were between the ages of 18 and 24; 23.5% were from 25 to 44; 22.1% were from 45 to 64; and 14.2% were 65 years of age or older. The gender makeup of the city was 47.8% male and 52.2% female.

=== 2000 census ===
As of the census of 2000, there were 21,574 people, 7,908 households, and 4,855 families living in the city. The population density was 3,023.5 inhabitants per square mile (1,167.4/km^{2}). There were 8,498 housing units at an average density of 1,191.0 per square mile (459.8/km^{2}). The racial makeup of the city was 84.47% White, 3.52% Black, 0.62% Native American, 0.83% Asian, 0.2%, 0.02% Pacific Islander, 7.72% from other races, and 2.83% from two or more races. Hispanic or Latino of any race were 16.99% of the population.

There were 7,908 households, out of which 31.7% had children under the age of 18 living with them, 40.8% were married couples living together, 15.9% had a female householder with no husband present, and 38.6% were non-families. 31.5% of all households were made up of individuals, and 12.9% had someone living alone who was 65 years of age or older. The average household size was 2.45 and the average family size was 3.09.

In the city, the population was spread out, with 25.3% under the age of 18, 15.4% from 18 to 24, 25.5% from 25 to 44, 19.0% from 45 to 64, and 14.8% who were 65 years of age or older. The median age was 32 years. For every 100 females, there were 87.0 males. For every 100 females age 18 and over, there were 80.8 males.

The median income for a household in the city was $32,405, and the median income for a family was $42,069. Males had a median income of $31,500 versus $23,359 for females. The per capita income for the city was $16,528. About 9.8% of families and 13.8% of the population were below the poverty line, including 15.5% of those under age 18 and 19.8% of those age 65 or over.

== Economy ==
=== Top employers ===
According to Adrian's 2023 Comprehensive Annual Financial Report, the top employers in the city are:

#	Employer	# of Employees
1	Lenawee County	564
2	Siena Heights University	498
3	Adrian College	400
4	Adrian Public Schools	400
5	Lenawee Intermediate School District	374
6	Adrian Steel	350
7	Adrian Dominican Sisters	300
8	Meijer	279
9	Plastic Omnium	260
10	Inergy Automotive	170

== Culture and life ==
Adrian is sometimes referred to as "the Maple City" due in part to the many sugar maple and other maple tree species found throughout the city. The Adrian High School sports teams are known as the "Adrian Maples" and several local businesses use maple in their names.

Adrian's cultural life has connections to the mid-19th century. The Adrian City Band is one of the oldest continuously active community bands in the country, founded in 1838. The Croswell Opera House is the oldest theater in Michigan. The Adrian Symphony Orchestra was founded in 1981. Adrian College and Siena Heights University also offer many cultural opportunities.

Heritage Park and Trestle Park have extensive mountain bike trails and boardwalks along the river. Trestle Park features a pedestrian walkway along a former railroad trestle.

== Government ==
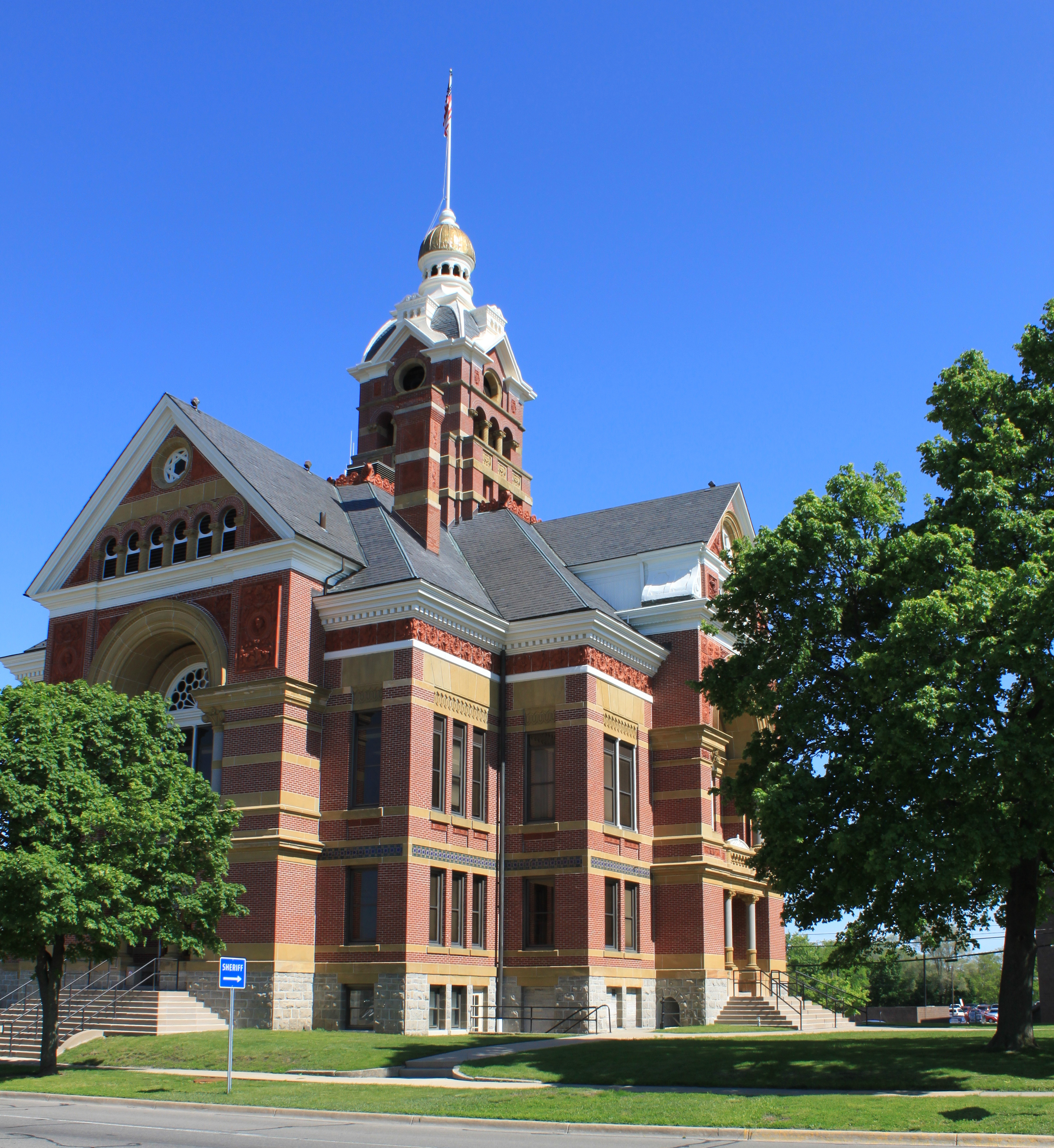
Lenawee County Courthouse in Adrian

Adrian is run by a city commission headed by a mayor. In November 2019, Angela Sword Heath defeated Shane Mackey to become the city's first female mayor. Its sister city is Moriyama, Shiga Prefecture, Japan. While Lenawee County is a close county that leans Republican, elections in Adrian are close but lean Democratic. The three voting precincts on Adrian's east side are more Democratic than the three on Adrian's west side.

== Education ==
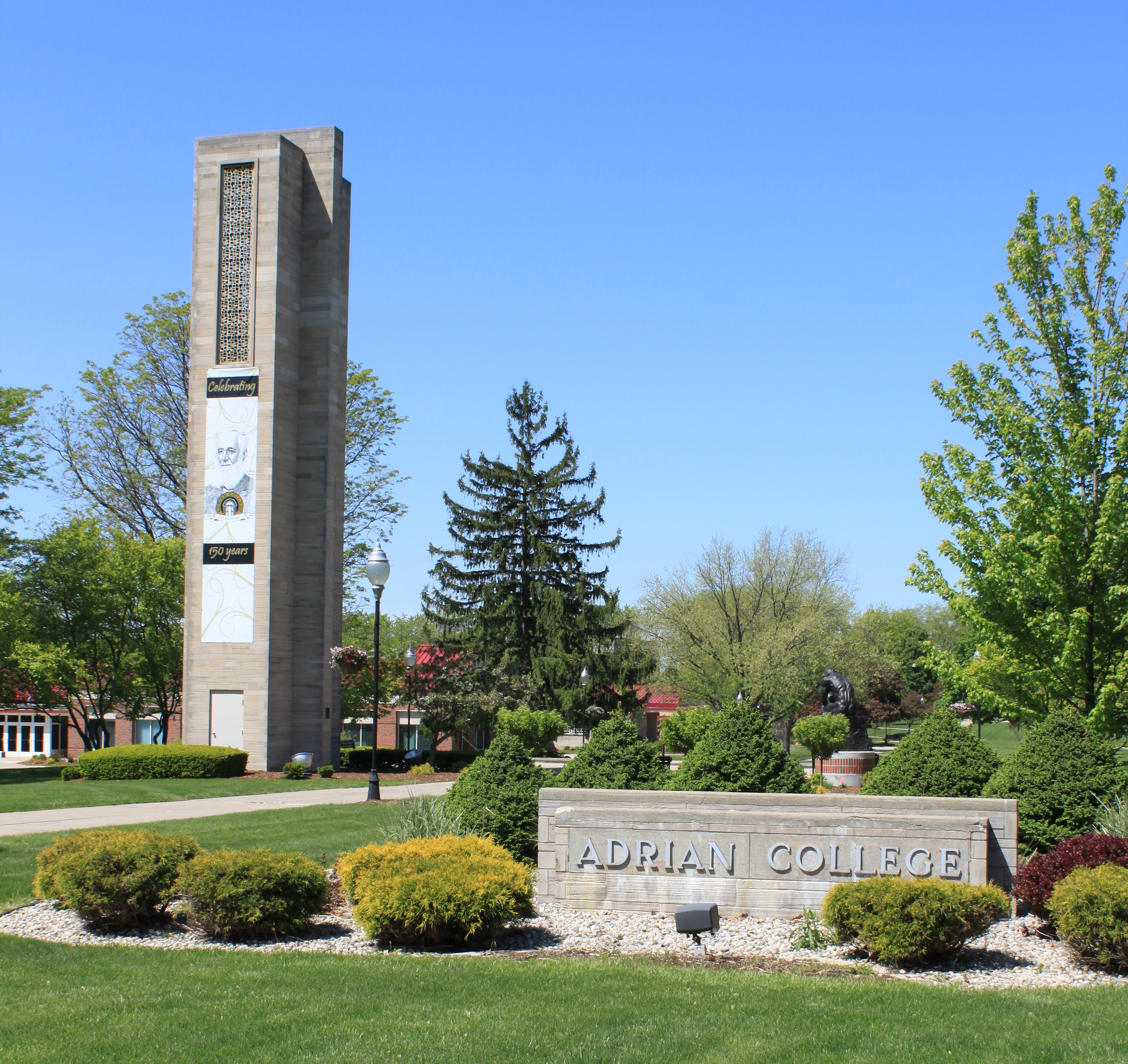
Herrick Tower, Adrian College

Adrian Public Schools serves Adrian and the surrounding area.

Madison School District is situated on the east side of Adrian.

Lenawee Christian School is a K-12 private Christian school situated on the west side of Adrian.

St. Stephen Lutheran School is a Christian PreK-8 school of the Wisconsin Evangelical Lutheran Synod in Adrian.

There are three colleges and universities in the city, namely:

- Adrian College
- Siena Heights University
- Jackson College

== Media ==
Adrian has two newspapers. The Daily Telegram was founded in 1892; it is published daily and is owned by Gannett. An independent monthly newspaper, The Lenawee Voice, was founded in 2023.

Local radio stations include WABJ 1490 AM (mainly syndicated talk); WLEN – 103.9 and 96.5 FM (news); WQTE 95.3 FM (country music); and WVAC 107.9 FM (student-operated radio from Adrian College). WBCL in Fort Wayne also operates a translator FM station in Adrian at 97.7.

Adrian is also served by radio and television signals from Ann Arbor, Toledo, and Jackson, and some Detroit broadcasters can also be seen or heard in parts of the area.

== Major highways ==
- US 223
- Bus. US 223
- M-34
- M-52
