= 2006 GFS Marketplace 400 =

Race details
- Race 23 of 36 in the 2006 NASCAR Nextel Cup Series
- 2006 GFS Marketplace 400 program cover
- Date: August 20, 2006
- Official name: GFS Marketplace 400
- Location: Michigan International Speedway, Brooklyn, Michigan
- Course: Permanent racing facility
- Course length: 2.0 miles (3.219 km)
- Distance: 200 laps, 400 mi (643.738 km)
- Average speed: 135.097 miles per hour (217.418 km/h)

Pole position
Driver	Jeff Burton	Richard Childress Racing
- Time: 38.311

Most laps led
Driver	Matt Kenseth	Roush Racing
- Laps: 87

Winner
No. 17	Matt Kenseth	Roush Racing

The 2006 GFS Marketplace 400 was a NASCAR Nextel Cup Series stock car race held on August 20, 2006, at Michigan International Speedway in Brooklyn, Michigan. Contested over 200 laps on a 2-mile (3.2-kilometre) speedway, it was the 23rd race of the 2006 NASCAR Nextel Cup Series season. Matt Kenseth of Roush Racing won the race.

== Background ==
Michigan International Speedway (MIS) is a 2-mile (3.2-kilometre) moderate-banked D-shaped speedway located off U.S. Highway 12 on more than 1,400 acres (5.7 km^{2}) approximately 4 miles (6.4 kilometres) south of the village of Brooklyn, in the scenic Irish Hills area of southeastern Michigan. The track is used primarily for NASCAR events. It is sometimes known as a "sister track" to Texas World Speedway, and was used as the basis of Auto Club Speedway. The track is owned by International Speedway Corporation (ISC). Michigan International Speedway is recognized as one of motorsports' premier facilities because of its wide racing surface and high banking (by open-wheel standards; the 18-degree banking is modest by stock car standards).

== Entry list ==
Car #	Driver	Hometown	Make	Sponsor	Team	Crew Chief
00	Hermie Sadler	Emporia, VA	Ford	MBA Racing	Michael Anderson	
01	Joe Nemechek	Lakeland, FL	Chevrolet	U.S. Army	Bobby Ginn	
1	Martin Truex Jr	Mayetta, NJ	Chevrolet	Bass Pro Shops / Tracker	Teresa Earnhardt	
2	Kurt Busch	Las Vegas, NV	Dodge	Miller Lite	Roger Penske	
4	Scott Wimmer	Wausau, WI	Chevrolet	Lucas Oil / Forward Air	Larry McClure	
5	Kyle Busch	Las Vegas, NV	Chevrolet	Kellogg's / Delphi	Rick Hendrick	
06	Todd Kluever	Sun Prairie, WI	Ford	3M Performance Finish	Jack Roush	
6	Mark Martin	Batesville, AR	Ford	AAA	Jack Roush	
07	Clint Bowyer	Emporia, KS	Chevrolet	Jack Daniel's Downhome Punch	Richard Childress	
7	Robby Gordon	Bellflower, CA	Chevrolet	Menards / Energizer	Robby Gordon	
8	Dale Earnhardt Jr	Kannapolis, NC	Chevrolet	Budweiser	Teresa Earnhardt	
9	Kasey Kahne	Enumclaw, WA	Dodge	Dodge Dealers / UAW	Ray Evernham	
10	Scott Riggs	Bahama, NC	Dodge	Valvoline / Stanley Tools	James Rocco	
11	Denny Hamlin	Chesterfield, VA	Chevrolet	FedEx Express	J D Gibbs	
12	Ryan Newman	South Bend, IN	Dodge	ALLTEL Fastap	Roger Penske	
14	Sterling Marlin	Columbia, TN	Chevrolet	Ginn Clubs & Resorts	Bobby Ginn	
15	Paul Menard	Eau Claire, WI	Chevrolet	Menards / Hot Shot	Teresa Earnhardt	
16	Greg Biffle	Vancouver, WA	Ford	National Guard	Geoff Smith	
17	Matt Kenseth	Cambridge, WI	Ford	DEWALT	Mark Martin	
18	JJ Yeley	Phoenix, AZ	Chevrolet	Husqvarna	Joe Gibbs	
19	Elliott Sadler	Emporia, VA	Dodge	Dodge Dealers / UAW	Ray Evernham	
20	Tony Stewart	Rushville, IN	Chevrolet	The Home Depot	Joe Gibbs	
21	Ken Schrader	Fenton, MO	Ford	Little Debbie	Glen Wood	
22	Dave Blaney	Hartford, OH	Dodge	Caterpillar	Bill Davis	
24	Jeff Gordon	Vallejo, CA	Chevrolet	DuPont	Rick Hendrick	
25	Brian Vickers	Thomasville, NC	Chevrolet	GMAC	Mary Hendrick	
26	Jamie McMurray	Joplin, MO	Ford	Crown Royal	Georgetta Roush	
29	Kevin Harvick	Bakersfield, CA	Chevrolet	GM Goodwrench	Richard Childress	
31	Jeff Burton	South Boston, VA	Chevrolet	Cingular Wireless	Richard Childress	
32	Travis Kvapil	Janesville, WI	Chevrolet	Tide-Downy	Calvin Wells III	
34	Mike Skinner	Ontario, CA	Chevrolet	Oak Glove Co.	Brad Jenkins	
38	David Gilliland	Riverside, CA	Ford	M&M's Dark	Robert Yates	
40	David Stremme	South Bend, IN	Dodge	Coors Light	Felix Sabates	
41	Reed Sorenson	Peachtree City, GA	Dodge	Target	Chip Ganassi	
42	Casey Mears	Bakersfield, CA	Dodge	Texaco / Havoline	Floyd Ganassi	
43	Bobby Labonte	Corpus Christi, TX	Dodge	Fruity Cheerios	Richard L Petty	
45	Kyle Petty	Trinity, NC	Dodge	Marathon American Spirit Motor Oil	Kyle Petty	
48	Jimmie Johnson	El Cajon, CA	Chevrolet	Lowe's	Jeff Gordon	
49	Kevin Lepage	Shelburne, VT	Dodge	LoansDepot.com	Elizabeth Morgenthau	
55	Michael Waltrip	Owensboro, KY	Dodge	Domino's Pizza Brownie Squares	Douglas Bawel	
61	Chad Chaffin	Smyrna, TN	Dodge	Ramada Inns	Bob Jenkins	
66	Jeff Green	Owensboro, KY	Chevrolet	Haas Automation / Best Buy	Gene Haas	
74	Derrike Cope	Spanaway, WA	Dodge	Sundance Vacations / Royal Admin. Svcs	Raynard McGlynn	
78	Kenny Wallace	St. Louis, MO	Chevrolet	Furniture Row Racing	Barney Visser	
88	Dale Jarrett	Hickory, NC	Ford	UPS	Robert Yates	
96	Tony Raines	LaPorte, IN	Chevrolet	DLP HDTV	Bill Saunders	
99	Carl Edwards	Columbia, MO	Ford	Office Depot	Jack Roush	

== Qualifying ==
Pos	Car #	Driver	Make	Primary Sponsor	Speed	Time	Behind
1	31	Jeff Burton	Chevrolet	Cingular Wireless	187.936	38.311	0.000
2	19	Elliott Sadler	Dodge	Dodge Dealers / UAW	187.071	38.488	-0.177
3	17	Matt Kenseth	Ford	DEWALT	186.804	38.543	-0.232
4	12	Ryan Newman	Dodge	ALLTEL Fastap	186.799	38.544	-0.233
5	29	Kevin Harvick	Chevrolet	GM Goodwrench	186.509	38.604	-0.293
6	16	Greg Biffle	Ford	National Guard	186.403	38.626	-0.315
7	42	Casey Mears	Dodge	Texaco / Havoline	186.027	38.704	-0.393
8	48	Jimmie Johnson	Chevrolet	Lowe's	185.970	38.716	-0.405
9	11	Denny Hamlin	Chevrolet	FedEx Express	185.720	38.768	-0.457
10	14	Sterling Marlin	Chevrolet	Ginn Clubs & Resorts	185.696	38.773	-0.462
11	5	Kyle Busch	Chevrolet	Kellogg's / Delphi	185.591	38.795	-0.484
12	24	Jeff Gordon	Chevrolet	DuPont	185.486	38.817	-0.506
13	1	Joe Nemechek	Chevrolet	U.S. Army	185.347	38.846	-0.535
14	6	Mark Martin	Ford	AAA	185.314	38.853	-0.542
15	9	Kasey Kahne	Dodge	Dodge Dealers / UAW	185.300	38.856	-0.545
16	2	Kurt Busch	Dodge	Miller Lite	185.247	38.867	-0.556
17	8	Dale Earnhardt Jr	Chevrolet	Budweiser	185.014	38.916	-0.605
18	1	Martin Truex Jr	Chevrolet	Bass Pro Shops / Tracker	184.814	38.958	-0.647
19	22	Dave Blaney	Dodge	Caterpillar	184.705	38.981	-0.670
20	99	Carl Edwards	Ford	Office Depot	184.606	39.002	-0.691
21	21	Ken Schrader	Ford	Little Debbie	184.535	39.017	-0.706
22	55	Michael Waltrip	Dodge	Domino's Pizza Brownie Squares	184.436	39.038	-0.727
23	10	Scott Riggs	Dodge	Valvoline / Stanley Tools	184.398	39.046	-0.735
24	7	Robby Gordon	Chevrolet	Menards / Energizer	184.365	39.053	-0.742
25	43	Bobby Labonte	Dodge	Fruity Cheerios	184.341	39.058	-0.747
26	38	David Gilliland	Ford	M&M's Dark	184.129	39.103	-0.792
27	25	Brian Vickers	Chevrolet	GMAC	184.124	39.104	-0.793
28	41	Reed Sorenson	Dodge	Target	183.974	39.136	-0.825
29	7	Clint Bowyer	Chevrolet	Jack Daniel's Downhome Punch	183.454	39.247	-0.936
30	32	Travis Kvapil	Chevrolet	Tide-Downy	183.449	39.248	-0.937
31	18	JJ Yeley	Chevrolet	Husqvarna	183.360	39.267	-0.956
32	40	David Stremme	Dodge	Coors Light	183.327	39.274	-0.963
33	20	Tony Stewart	Chevrolet	The Home Depot	183.281	39.284	-0.973
34	74	Derrike Cope	Dodge	Sundance Vacations / Royal Admin. Svcs	183.188	39.304	-0.993
35	66	Jeff Green	Chevrolet	Haas Automation / Best Buy	182.806	39.386	-1.075
36	15	Paul Menard	Chevrolet	Menards / Hot Shot	182.477	39.457	-1.146
37	88	Dale Jarrett	Ford	UPS	182.440	39.465	-1.154
38	6	Todd Kluever	Ford	3M Performance Finish	182.357	39.483	-1.172
39	49	Kevin Lepage	Dodge	LoansDepot.com	182.302	39.495	-1.184
40	26	Jamie McMurray	Ford	Crown Royal	181.337	39.705	-1.394
41	96	Tony Raines	Chevrolet	DLP HDTV	181.000	39.779	-1.468
42	45	Kyle Petty	Dodge	Marathon American Spirit Motor Oil	178.479	40.341	-2.030
43	00	Hermie Sadler	Chevrolet	MBA Racing	182.149	39.528	-1.217
Failed to qualify
44	4	Scott Wimmer	Chevrolet	Lucas Oil / Forward Air			
45	34	Mike Skinner	Chevrolet	Oak Glove Co.			
46	61	Chad Chaffin	Dodge	Oak Glove Co.			
47	78	Kenny Wallace	Chevrolet	Furniture Row Racing			

== Results ==
Fin	St	#	Driver	Sponsor	Make	Laps	Led	Status	Pts	PTS
1	3	17	Matt Kenseth	DeWalt	Ford	200	87	running	190	190
2	12	24	Jeff Gordon	DuPont	Chevy	200	12	running	175	175
3	33	20	Tony Stewart	Home Depot	Chevy	200	0	running	165	165
4	15	9	Kasey Kahne	Dodge Dealers, UAW, SRT	Dodge	200	0	running	160	160
5	14	6	Mark Martin	AAA	Ford	200	0	running	155	155
6	17	8	Dale Earnhardt, Jr.	Budweiser	Chevy	200	40	running	155	155
7	6	16	Greg Biffle	Subway, National Guard	Ford	200	0	running	146	146
8	28	41	Reed Sorenson	Target	Dodge	200	0	running	142	142
9	9	11	Denny Hamlin	FedEx Express	Chevy	200	0	running	138	138
10	2	19	Elliott Sadler	Dodge Dealers, UAW	Dodge	200	0	running	134	134
11	5	29	Kevin Harvick	GM Goodwrench	Chevy	200	0	running	130	130
12	24	7	Robby Gordon	Jim Beam	Chevy	200	0	running	127	127
13	8	48	Jimmie Johnson	Lowe's	Chevy	200	0	running	124	124
14	23	10	Scott Riggs	Valvoline, Stanley Tools	Dodge	200	0	running	121	121
15	27	25	Brian Vickers	GMAC	Chevy	200	0	running	118	118
16	7	42	Casey Mears	Texaco, Havoline	Dodge	200	0	running	115	115
17	40	26	Jamie McMurray	Crown Royal	Ford	200	8	running	117	117
18	21	21	Ken Schrader	Little Debbie	Ford	200	0	running	109	109
19	25	43	Bobby Labonte	Cheerios, Betty Crocker	Dodge	200	0	running	106	106
20	36	15	Paul Menard	Menards, Quaker State	Chevy	200	0	running	103	103
21	30	32	Travis Kvapil	Tide, Downy	Chevy	200	0	running	100	100
22	20	99	Carl Edwards	Office Depot	Ford	200	32	running	102	102
23	22	55	Michael Waltrip	NAPA Auto Parts	Dodge	200	0	running	94	94
24	19	22	Dave Blaney	Caterpillar	Dodge	200	0	running	91	91
25	4	12	Ryan Newman	Alltel Fastap	Dodge	200	8	running	93	93
26	13	01	Joe Nemechek	U.S. Army	Chevy	200	0	running	85	85
27	35	66	Jeff Green	Best Buy Teach	Chevy	200	0	running	82	82
28	32	40	David Stremme	Coors Light	Dodge	200	0	running	79	79
29	10	14	Sterling Marlin	Ginn Clubs & Resorts	Chevy	199	0	running	76	76
30	18	1	Martin Truex, Jr.	Bass Pro Shops, Tracker Boats	Chevy	199	0	running	73	73
31	42	45	Kyle Petty	Marathon American Spirit Motor Oil	Dodge	199	1	running	75	75
32	41	96	Tony Raines	DLP HDTV	Chevy	199	0	running	67	67
33	29	07	Clint Bowyer	Jack Daniel's	Chevy	197	6	engine	69	69
34	34	74	Derrike Cope	Sundance Vacations, Royal Administration Services	Dodge	197	0	running	61	61
35	43	00	Hermie Sadler	MBA Motorsports	Ford	197	2	running	63	63
36	37	88	Dale Jarrett	UPS	Ford	166	0	engine	55	55
37	31	18	J.J. Yeley	Interstate Batteries	Chevy	158	0	crash	52	52
38	26	38	David Gilliland	M&M's	Ford	145	0	running	49	49
39	11	5	Kyle Busch	Kellogg's	Chevy	132	3	running	51	51
40	16	2	Kurt Busch	Miller Lite	Dodge	127	1	crash	48	48
41	39	49	Kevin Lepage	LoansDepot.com	Dodge	103	0	crash	40	40
42	1	31	Jeff Burton	Cingular Wireless	Chevy	17	0	engine	37	37
43	38	06	Todd Kluever	3M, Post-it Notes	Ford	10	0	crash	34	34
Failed to qualify
44		4	Scott Wimmer	Lucas Oil / Forward Air	Chevrolet					
45		34	Mike Skinner	Oak Glove Co.	Chevrolet					
46		61	Chad Chaffin	Oak Glove Co.	Dodge					
47		78	Kenny Wallace	Furniture Row Racing	Chevrolet					

== Race statistics ==
- Time of race: 2:57:39
- Average speed: 135.097 miles per hour (217.418 km/h)
- Pole speed: 187.936 miles per hour (302.454 km/h)
- Cautions: 10 for 36 laps
- Margin of victory: 0.622 seconds
- Lead changes: 26
- Percent of race run under caution: 18%
- Average green flag run: 14.9 laps

Previous race: 2006 AMD at The Glen	Nextel Cup Series; 2006 season	Next race: 2006 Sharpie 500
