= Detroit Commerce Building =

Building in Michigan, United States

Coordinates: 42.3316°N 83.0493°W

The Detroit Commerce Building was located at 138-150 Michigan Avenue (the corner of Michigan Avenue and Shelby Street), in downtown Detroit, Michigan. The high-rise stood at 13 stories, 12 above-ground, and one basement floor. It was built in 1915 as headquarters for the People's Outfitting Company department store and was designed in the Chicago School architectural style. The store moved to other quarters in 1959 and the building was converted to office space. For many years, the building was home to the Greater Detroit Chamber of Commerce, for which it was named, and various agencies of the City of Detroit and Wayne County.

It was demolished in 2007 to create a parking garage for the Book Cadillac Hotel. The ten-story garage is topped by five additional stories containing 80 condominiums, developed between 2015 and 2016 by Roxbury Group.
