= M124 =

M124 or M-124 may refer to:

- M-124 (Michigan highway)
- a mutation defining the human haplogroup R2 (Y-DNA)
- M124 (Cape Town), a Metropolitan Route in Cape Town, South Africa
