= Irish Hills Towers =

- U.S. National Register of Historic Places
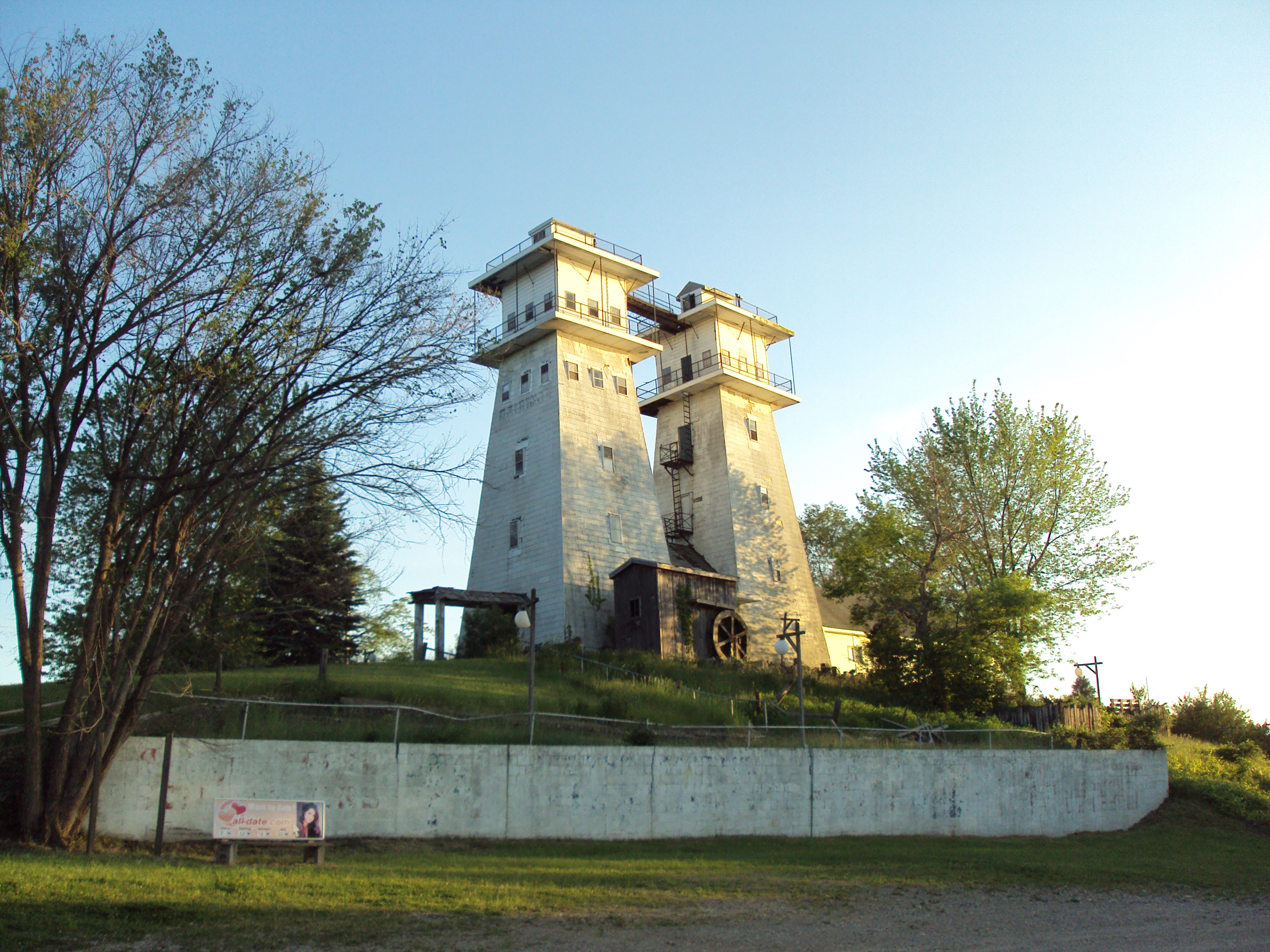

- Location within Michigan Location within the United States
- Interactive map
- Location: 8433 West U.S. Highway 12, Cambridge Township, Michigan
- Coordinates: 42°03′22″N 84°09′23″W
- Built: 1924
- NRHP reference No.: 07000380
- Added to NRHP: May 2, 2007

The Irish Hills Towers are two wooden observation towers located at 8433 West U.S. Highway 12 in Cambridge Township, Lenawee County, Michigan, in the Irish Hills region. They were added to the National Register of Historic Places on May 2, 2007.

== History ==
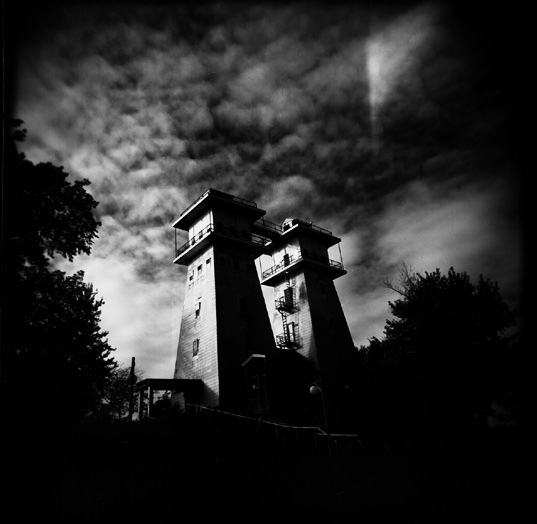
Twin towers in the Irish Hills

In the early 1920s, the Michigan Observation Company sought places of high elevation to erect 50-foot-high (15 m) enclosed platforms to boost tourism. In southern Michigan, a tower was placed atop Bundy Hill in Hillsdale County and officials sought a knoll in the heart of the Irish Hills in Lenawee County. A farmer who owned half of the knoll, Edward Kelly, turned down the company's offer to purchase his portion of the land. The adjoining land owner, Thomas Brighton, consented to the sale of his plat, and construction of the Irish Hills Observatory commenced.

The opening of the Irish Hills Observatory was announced by The Brooklyn Exponent in September 1924. In a gala celebration on October 4 and October 5, hundreds of people ascended the hill and tower to gaze upon the rolling landscape and crystal blue lakes in all directions. Kelly seemed angered by the exploitation of the MOC's venture, and protested by erecting his own tower. By the end of November, 1924, his own observation platform was in place, just feet away from the MOC's structure and several feet higher.

The Michigan Observation Company responded by adding a second observation enclosure to the top of its own facilities, now designated as the Original Irish Hills Tower. Kelly proceeded to add a raised platform to his "Gray" tower (named as such because of its gray-painted exterior), an act which brought the two edifices to an even height. The MOC informed Kelly that if he attempted to compete with more height given to his tower, they would tear down their own and construct a metal observatory so large that Kelly's efforts would be nullified. He conceded, and turned his efforts instead to drawing more revenue to his creation.

The Irish Hills Towers operated as separate and competitive entities through the 1950s, when Frank Lamping acquired both and connected them with a gift shop at the ground floor. They briefly closed in the late 1960s, and were refurbished in 1972, by Allen Good. They were given new observation platforms, and, as a result, attained a near-identical look.

The Irish Hills Towers closed to the public at the end of the summer of 2000. The township deemed the towers unsafe in April 2013. The Irish Hills Historical Society began demolition of the tops of the towers on July 1, 2013 to begin the process of bringing them up to code. As of their September 2014 meeting, the township board had once again agreed to hold off demolition while the historical society continued fundraising to save the landmarks. A news report in January 2024 stated that the towers "remained shuttered" due to a lack of funding. Only a basic preservation had been completed: "without cash flow, the vision to restore the towers and reopen them as a museum attraction goes unrealized".The Irish Hills Historical Society replaced windows and roof caps, installed siding and performed other restoration to avoid demolition.

On September 28, 2024, The Irish Hills Historical Society has hosted a 100-year celebration, at the Irish Hills Towers. The event was three hours long and featured a food truck and music, allowing the audience to walk the grounds around the twin towers.
