= M-124 (Michigan highway) =

State highway in Jackson and Lenawee counties in Michigan, United States

M-124

Route information
- Maintained by MDOT
- Length: 7.731 mi (12.442 km)
- Existed: 1929–present

Major junctions
- West end: M-50 at Brooklyn
- East end: US 12 near Springville

Location
- Country: United States
- State: Michigan
- Counties: Jackson, Lenawee

Highway system
- Michigan State Trunkline Highway System; Interstate; US; State; Byways
← M-123	→ M-125

M-124 is a state trunkline highway in the Lower Peninsula of the US state of Michigan that runs on the north side of Vineyard and Wamplers lakes near Brooklyn in Jackson County near the Irish Hills area. The highway travels directly through W. J. Hayes State Park before ending in Lenawee County. The designation was created in 1929 for a road that accessed the state park, connecting it to US Highway 112 (US 112, now US 12). It was later extended westward to M-50 in Brooklyn in the 1930s.

== Route description ==
M-124 begins at an intersection with M-50 just south of Brooklyn. The trunkline runs eastward on Wampers Lake Road through a residential section of town and crosses the River Raisin on the north side of Vineyard Lake. After passing Vineyard Lake, the highway curves towards the southwest as it passes several other smaller lakes and heads towards Wamplers Lake. M-124 passes between Wamplers and Mud lakes, curving around the eastern side of Wamplers Lake as it enters Walter J. Hayes State Park from the north. The park is a popular tourist destination for boaters, craft and antique shows and its close proximity to Michigan International Speedway. The road nearly bisects the park as it passes through near Round Lake before exiting the park and terminating an at intersection with US 12.

M-124 is maintained by the Michigan Department of Transportation (MDOT) like other state highways in Michigan. According to the department between 1,692 and 4,222 vehicles used the highway each day. No segment of M-124 is listed on the National Highway System, a network of roads important to the country's economy, defense, and mobility.

== History ==
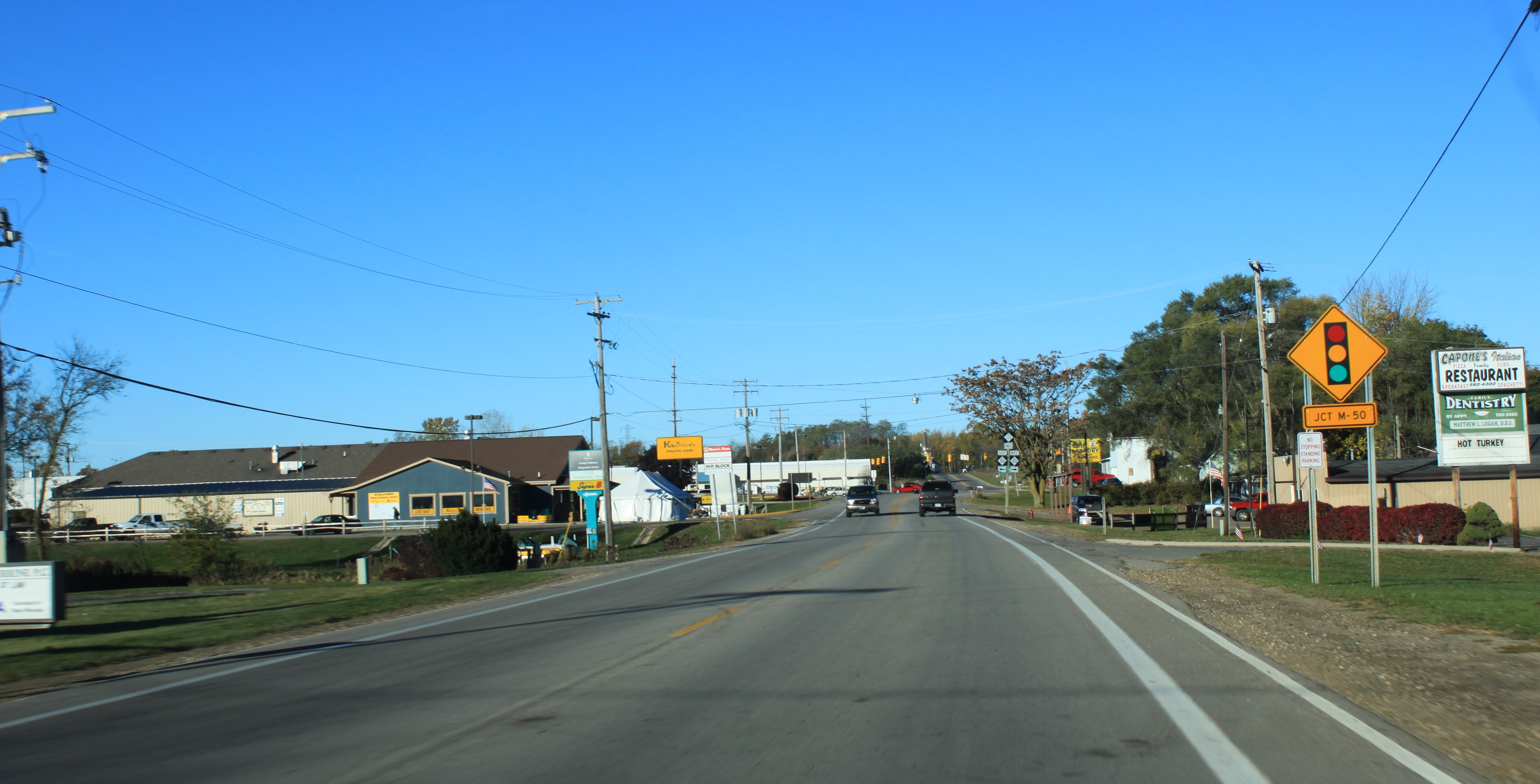
M-124 western terminus at junction with M-50, facing west, Brooklyn

When M-124 was designated in 1929, it extended from US 112 (what is now US 12) north to Cedar Hills State Park. Between 1929 and 1932 a series of extensions and realignments proceeded to move the route further northward, at the same time the park was renamed to its present-day moniker, Walter J. Hayes State Park, to honor Walter J. Hayes. In 1933, the western end was extended to terminate at M-50 in Brooklyn. This western section of the highway was realigned to is present course in 1939. The trunkline has retained this alignment ever since.

== Major intersections ==
County	Location	mi	km	Destinations	Notes
Jackson	Brooklyn	0.000	0.000	M-50 – Jackson, Monroe	Road continues from the west as Constitution Avenue
Lenawee	Cambridge Township	7.731	12.442	US 12 – Coldwater, Ypsilanti	Road continues to the south as Boardman Drive
1.000 mi = 1.609 km; 1.000 km = 0.621 mi

== See also ==
- Irish Hills
