= Loss E. Jones =

American politician

Loss E. Jones was an American politician.

On November 2, 1846, Jones was elected to the Michigan House of Representatives where he represented the Jackson County district from January 4, 1847, to March 17, 1847. During his term in the legislature, he served on the Education committee. Jones lived in Brooklyn, Michigan.
