= Michiana (disambiguation) =

Michiana is a region on the Indiana/Michigan border in the U.S.

Michiana may also refer to:

== Places ==
- Michiana, Michigan
- Michiana Shores, Indiana

== Other ==
- Michiana Parkway
