= Hayes State Park =

Park in Michigan, USA

Walter J. Hayes State Park
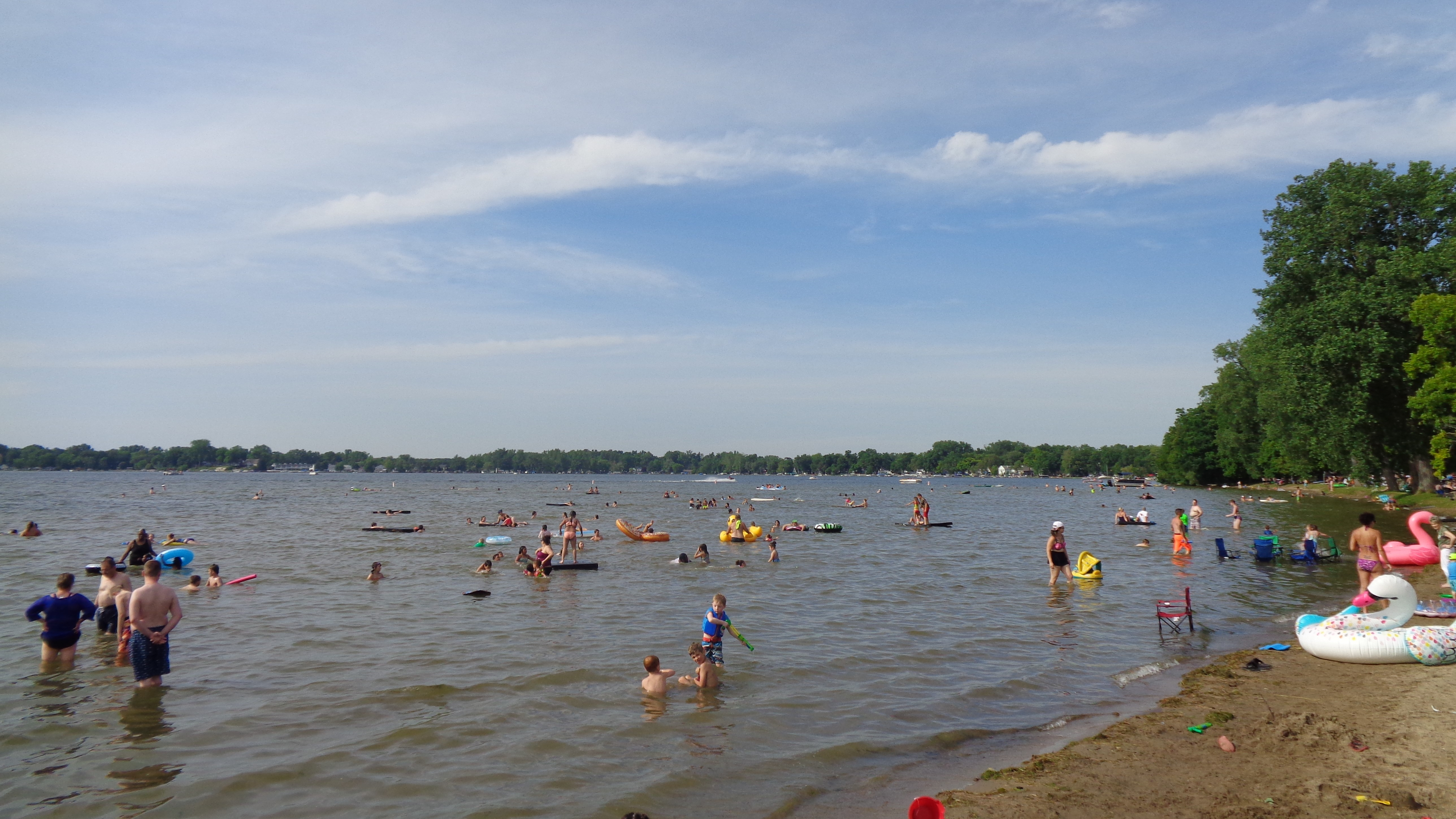
- Beach area along Wamplers Lake

- Location within Michigan Location within the United States
- Location: Lenawee County, Michigan, United States
- Nearest town: Onsted, Michigan
- Coordinates: 42°04′16″N 84°07′54″W
- Area: 654 acres (265 ha)
- Elevation: 968 feet (295 m)
- Established: 1920
- Administrator: Michigan Department of Natural Resources
- Designation: Michigan state park
- Website: Official website

Walter J. Hayes State Park is a public recreation area covering 654 acres (265 ha) on the southeast corner of Wamplers Lake in the Irish Hills region of the state of Michigan. Most of the state park lies within Lenawee County with a small portion extending into Jackson and Washtenaw counties in the Round Lake area. The park offers access to 796-acre (322 ha) Wamplers Lake and completely surrounds 100-acre (40 ha) Round Lake, which connects to Wamplers Lake via a channel navigable by smaller boats. Other scenic lakes including Evans Lake and Sand Lake as well as chains of smaller lakes lie nearby. The park is traversed by Michigan Route 124 north of its intersection with US Highway 12.

== History ==
Dedicated in 1920, the park was among the first 25 established by the Michigan State Parks Commission, which referred to it as both Cedar Hills State Park and Adrian State Park. It originally comprised a 99-acre purchase by the state plus two donations of land which brought the park's size to some 200 acres. It was renamed in 1930 after the family of Michigan State Senator Walter J. Hayes made a donation of land with the stipulation that the name change take place. The Civilian Conservation Corps made improvements to the park during the 1930s. Michigan CCC camp SP1 was active in Hayes State Park from 1933 to 1935.

== Facilities and activities ==
The park offers fishing for bass, bluegill and pike, swimming, hiking, picnicking, boat launch, boat rentals, campgrounds, and mini-cabins.
