= Michiana Parkway =

Michiana Parkway may refer to part or all of the following:

- M-217 (Michigan highway)
- County Road 17 (Elkhart County, Indiana)
