= M-218 (Michigan highway) =

Former state highway in Oakland County, Michigan, United States

M-218
- M-218 highlighted in red on a modern map

Route information
- Maintained by MDOT
- Length: 18.108 mi (29.142 km)
- Existed: c. 1936–1963

Major junctions
- West end: I-96 in Wixom
- US 10 in Pontiac
- East end: Bus. US 10 in Pontiac

Location
- Country: United States
- State: Michigan
- Counties: Oakland

Highway system
- Michigan State Trunkline Highway System; Interstate; US; State; Byways
← M-217	→ M-221

M-218 was a state trunkline highway in the US state of Michigan that served as a connector route from Interstate 96 (I-96, originally US Highway 16, US 16) in Wixom through Oakland County's lake country area to Business US 10 (Bus. US 10) in Pontiac. M-218 was originally designated by 1936 and extended into Pontiac in 1938. The highway was decommissioned in 1963.

== Route description ==
M-218 began at a junction with I-96 in Wixom. From there, the road traveled north via Wixom Road to 14 Mile Road and continued northeast. The trunkline then continued along Pontiac Trail through the communities of Walled Lake, Orchard Lake Village, Keego Harbor and Sylvan Lake in Oakland County's lake country. Northeast of Sylvan lake, the highway crossed US 10 (Telegraph Road) and crossed into Pontiac. M-218 terminated at a junction with Bus. US 10 in downtown.

== History ==
M-218 was proposed in 1936 as part of connection between Chicago and Port Huron, Michigan. As first introduced into the State Trunkline System by 1936, it served as a connector between M-58 in Pontiac and US 16 in West Novi. In 1938, the route was extended into Pontiac where it terminated at US 10. In 1958, plans for an extension to Northwestern Highway (now M-10) to M-59 included an interchange to connect to M-218.

In 1963, the highway was scheduled to receiving upgrades, including an expansion from two to four lanes between Keego Harbor and Sylvan Lake, elimination of sharp curves and the reduction of some steep grades along the highway. The cost was expected to be $1.6 million (equivalent to $12.5 million in 2024), including the first phase already contracted at a cost of $512,964 (equivalent to $4.02 million in 2024). The second phase of work on the highway was bid in April 1963 to modernize 12.2 miles (19.6 km) at a cost of $609,018 (equivalent to $4.77 million in 2024). The trunkline was removed from the trunkline system by the end of 1963, although it was still being mentioned in news articles as a location reference as late as 1978.

== Major intersections ==
The entire highway was in Oakland County.

Location	mi	km	Destinations	Notes
Wixom	0.000	0.000	I-96 – Lansing, Detroit	Western terminus
Pontiac	16.236– 16.247	26.129– 26.147	US 10 (Telegraph Road) – Detroit, Flint	Now US 24
Pontiac	18.108	29.142	Bus. US 10 (Woodward Avenue)	Now BL I-75/Bus. US 24
1.000 mi = 1.609 km; 1.000 km = 0.621 mi
