= M-205 (Michigan highway) =

Former state highway in Cass County, Michigan, United States

M-205
- M-205 highlighted in red on a modern map

Route information
- Maintained by MDOT
- Length: 1.709 mi (2.750 km)
- Existed: 1935–2002

Major junctions
- South end: SR 19 near Elkhart
- North end: US 12 near Union

Location
- Country: United States
- State: Michigan
- Counties: Cass

Highway system
- Michigan State Trunkline Highway System; Interstate; US; State; Byways
← M-204	→ M-206

M-205 was a state trunkline highway in the US state of Michigan. The route was turned back to local control in October 2002 by the Michigan Department of Transportation (MDOT) after the completion of M-217 (Michiana Parkway). MDOT swapped roadways with the Cass County Road Commission ending the 67-year history of M-205.

== Route description ==
M-205 ran from State Road 19 (SR 19) at the state line north of Elkhart, Indiana, northward for about one-half mile (0.80 km) along Cassopolis Road before turning easterly to US Highway 12 (US 12, the former US 112) between Union and Adamsville. The highway went through no towns within Michigan, but did connect with some local roads.

== History ==
When the state highway system was initially signposted in 1919, a highway numbered M-23 ran north from the state line near Union and turned east, eventually connecting all the way to Ypsilanti in Washtenaw County, east of Detroit. On the original approved US Highway plan, M-23 was replaced by US 112, running over the border into Indiana. Michigan diverted that highway along a route entirely within Michigan, and the very short segment of highway became M-205. The curve between Cassopolis and Redfield roads was realigned to give M-205 a more sweeping curve in 1950. As part of the swap between MDOT and Cass County, M-217 was designated several miles to the east as a new connector to the toll road, and M-205 was transferred to local control in 2002, decommissioning the trunkline.

The highway is now identified as "Old M-205" on road signs. Its old northern end, an intersection on US 12 was rebuilt as a traffic circle after the highway was decommissioned.

== Major intersections ==
The entire highway was in Mason Township, Cass County.

mi	km	Destinations	Notes
0.000	0.000	SR 19 south – Elkhart	Indiana state line
1.709	2.750	US 12 – Niles, Coldwater	
1.000 mi = 1.609 km; 1.000 km = 0.621 mi
