= Cambridge Township, Michigan =

- Civil township
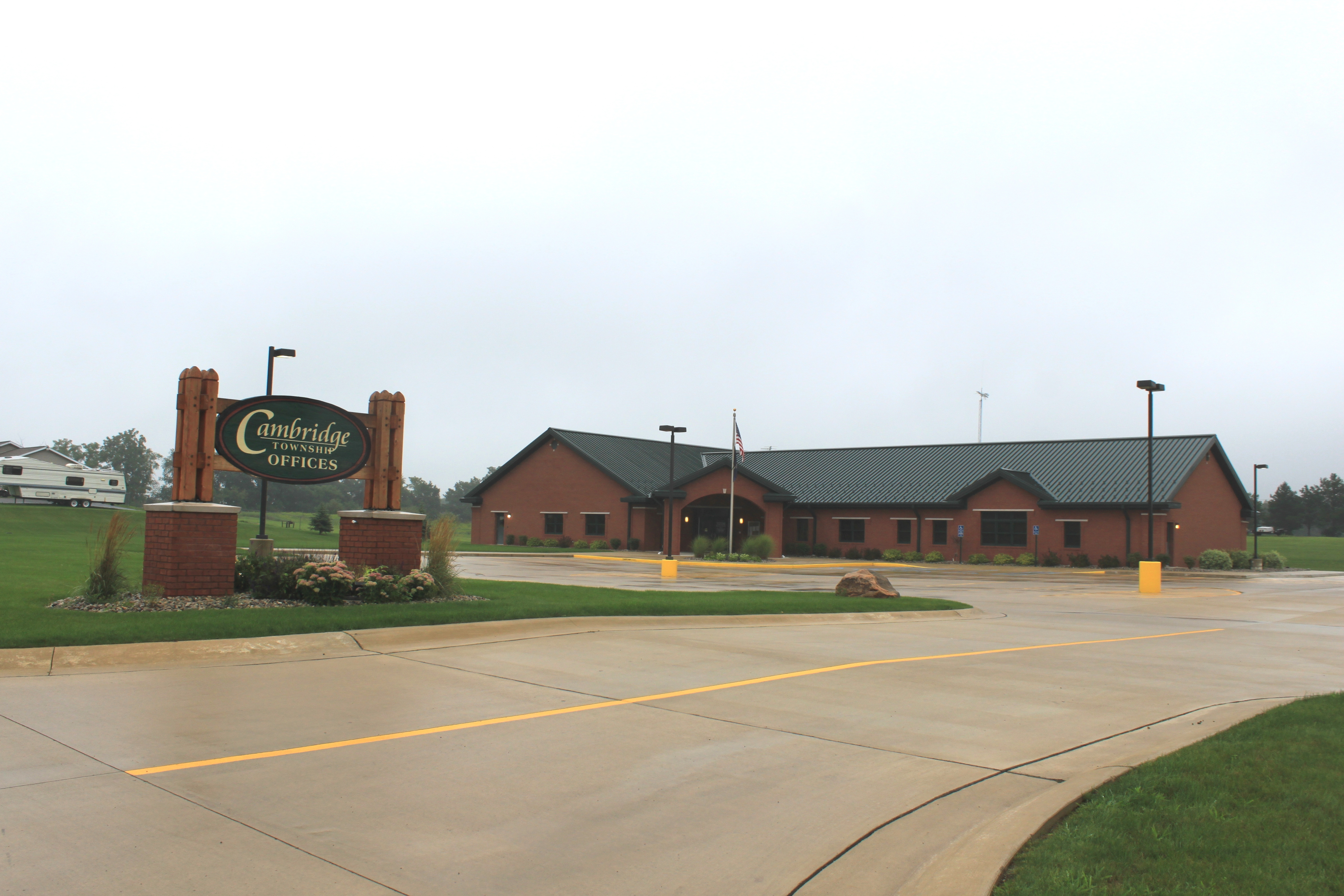
- Township Offices along M-50

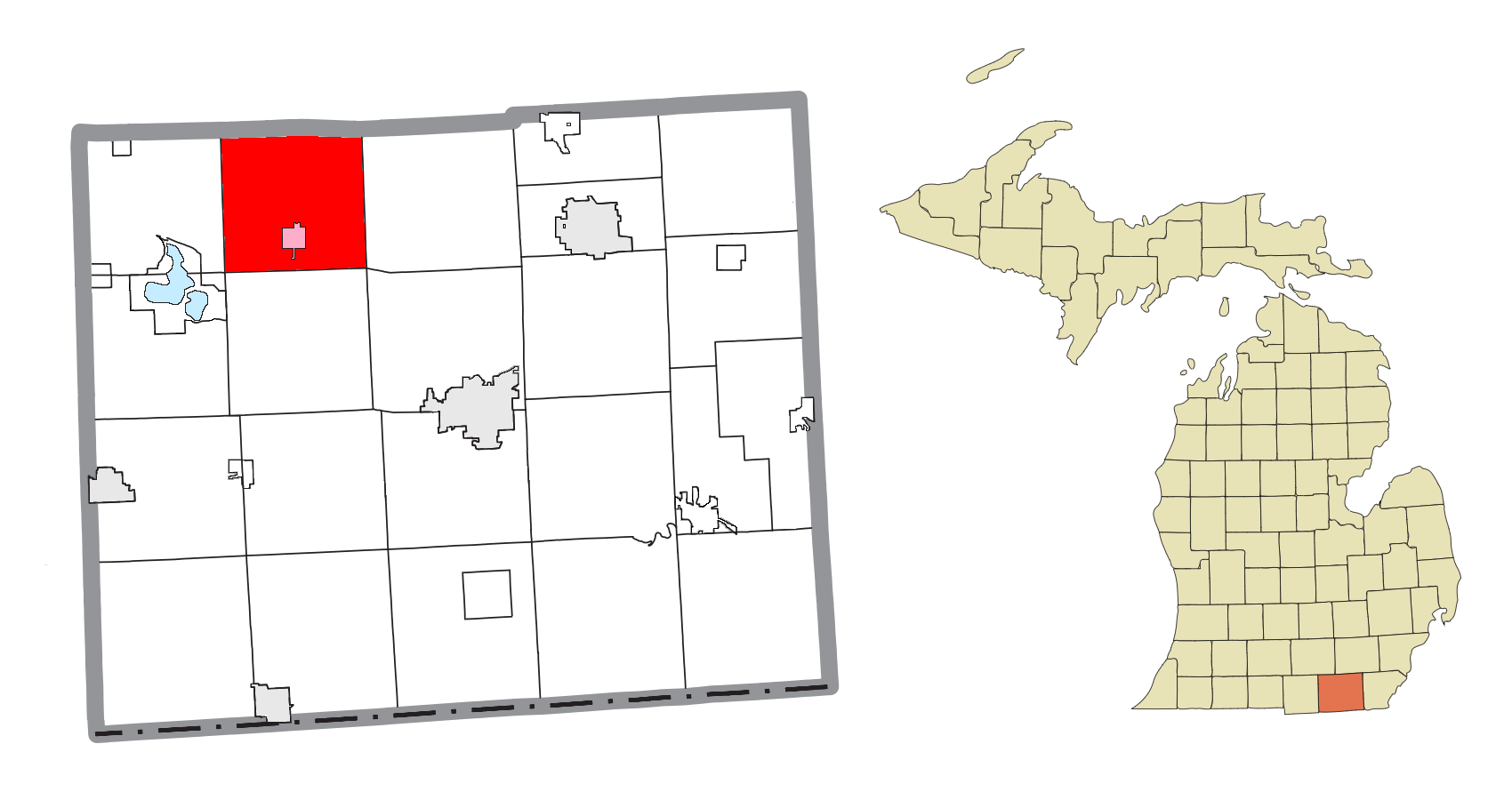
- Location within Lenawee County (red) and the administered village of Onsted (pink)

- Location within the state of Michigan Cambridge Township (the United States)
- Coordinates: 42°02′39″N 84°10′58″W
- Country: United States
- State: Michigan
- County: Lenawee
- Established: 1835

Government
  - Supervisor: Tom Kissel
  - Clerk: Rick W. Richardson
  - Treasurer: Diane Higgins

Area
  - Total: 35.5 sq mi (91.9 km^{2})
  - Land: 32.0 sq mi (82.9 km^{2})
  - Water: 3.5 sq mi (9.0 km^{2})
- Elevation: 971 ft (296 m)

Population (2020)
  - Total: 5,722
  - Density: 179/sq mi (69.0/km^{2})
- Time zone: UTC-5 (Eastern (EST))
  - Summer (DST): UTC-4 (EDT)
- ZIP code(s): 49230 (Brooklyn); 49253 (Manitou Beach); 49265 (Onsted)
- Area code: 517
- FIPS code: 26-12720
- GNIS feature ID: 1626026
- Website: www.cambridgetownshipmi.gov

Cambridge Township is a civil township of Lenawee County in the U.S. state of Michigan. The population was 5,722 at the 2020 census.

== Communities ==
- The village of Onsted is in the southern part of the township.
- Springville is an unincorporated community on M-50 in the central portion of the township at 42°02′00″N 84°10′16″W. A post office operated from January 21, 1835, until August 31, 1905.

== Geography ==
According to the United States Census Bureau, the township has a total area of 35.5 square miles (92 km^{2}), of which 32.0 square miles (83 km^{2}) is land and 3.5 square miles (9.1 km^{2}) is water, a total of 9.80%.

== Demographics ==
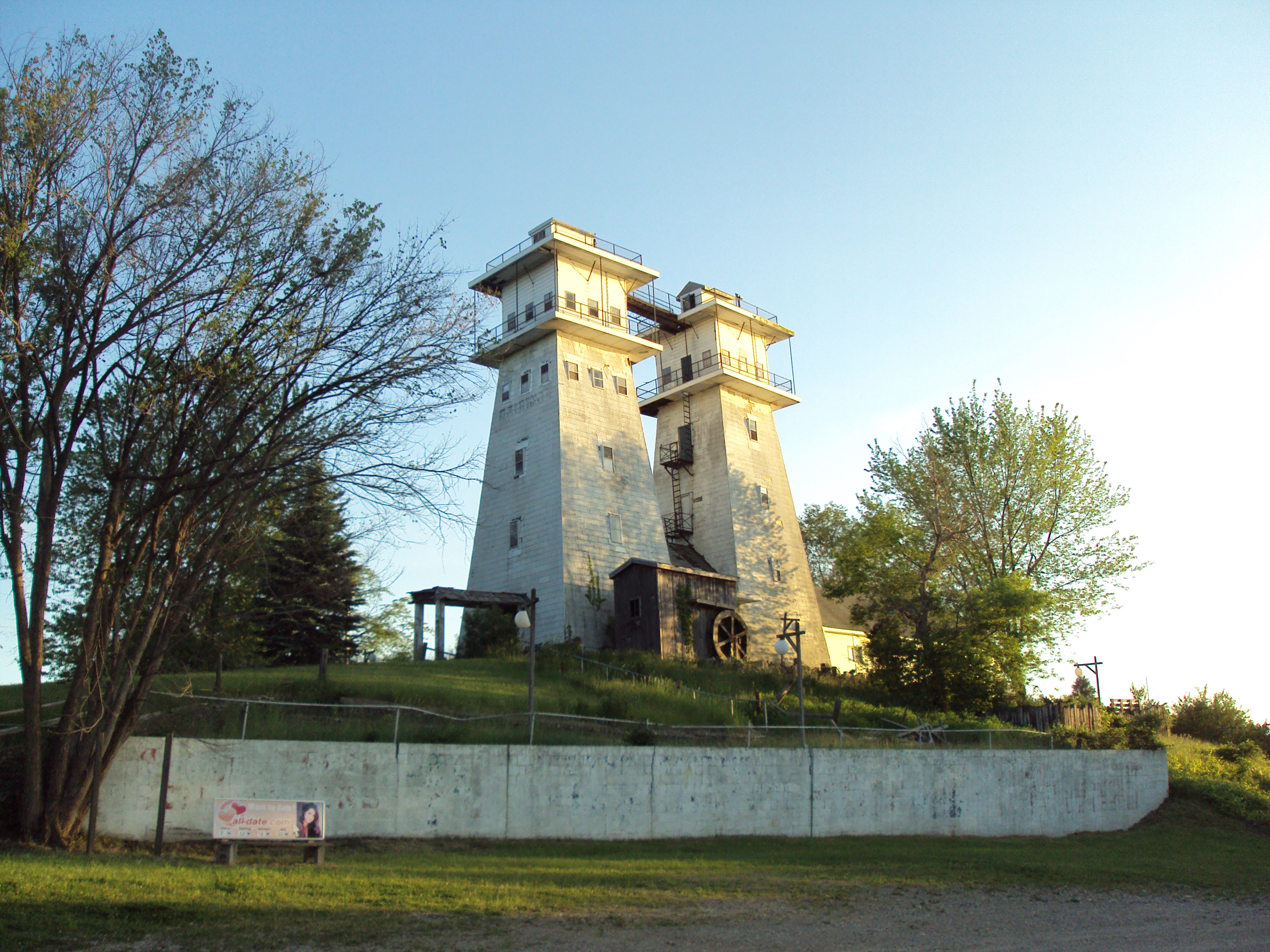
Towers of the Irish Hills on US 12

As of the census of 2000, there were 5,299 people, 1,996 households, and 1,566 families in the township. The population density was 165.5 inhabitants per square mile (63.9/km^{2}). There were 2,686 housing units at an average density of 83.9 per square mile (32.4/km^{2}). The racial makeup of the township was 97.30% White, 0.15% African American, 0.36% Native American, 0.26% Asian, 0.66% from other races, and 1.26% from two or more races. Hispanic or Latino of any race were 2.02% of the population.

Of the 1,996 households, 33.9% had children under the age of 18 living with them, 68.8% were married couples living together, 6.4% had a female householder with no husband present, and 21.5% were non-families. 17.8% of households were one person, and 6.9% were one person aged 65 or older. The average household size was 2.65 and the average family size was 3.01.

In the township the population was spread out, with 25.8% under the age of 18, 6.1% from 18 to 24, 27.8% from 25 to 44, 29.1% from 45 to 64, and 11.3% 65 or older. The median age was 40 years. For every 100 females, there were 99.4 males. For every 100 females age 18 and over, there were 97.5 males.

The median household income was $59,450 and the median family income was $70,246. Males had a median income of $52,005 versus $26,605 for females. The per capita income for the township was $26,705. About 2.5% of families and 3.4% of the population were below the poverty line, including 3.3% of those under age 18 and 2.5% of those age 65 or over.

== Notable person ==
- Lyster Hoxie Dewey, botanist.
