= Brooklyn, Michigan =

- Village
- Village of Brooklyn
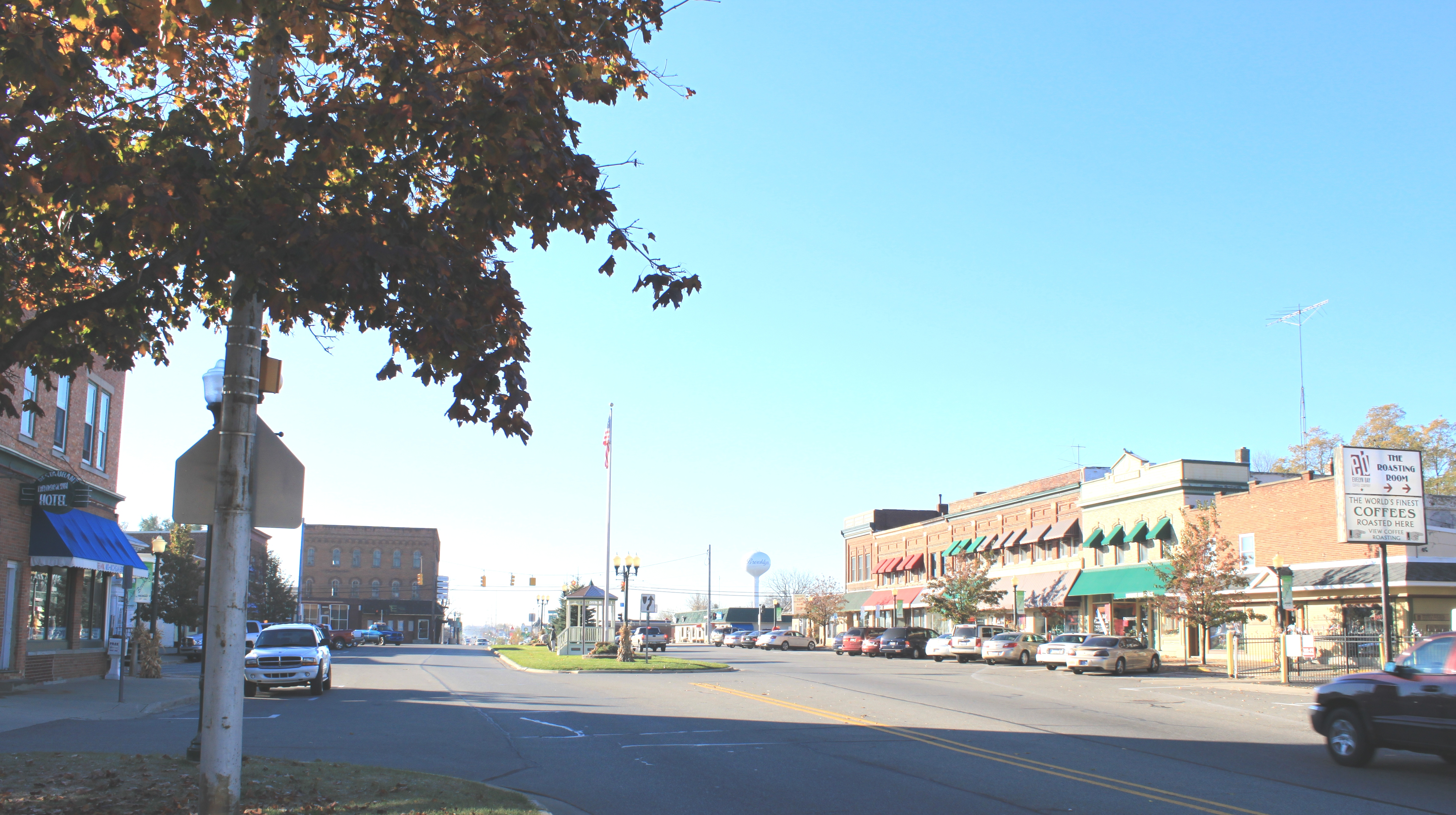
- Looking south along Main Street (M-50)
- Motto: " A Place For All Seasons"
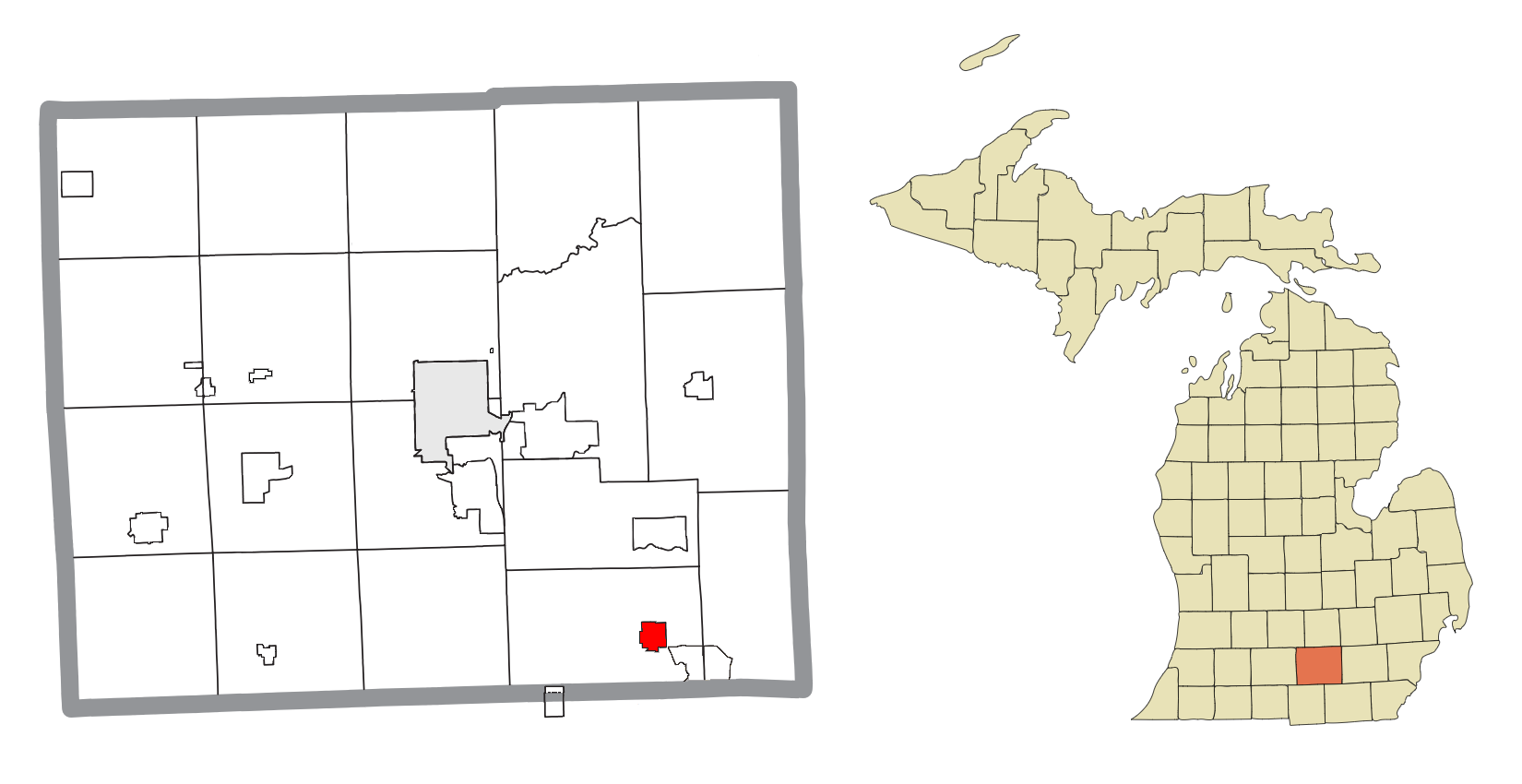
- Location within Jackson County

- Location within the state of Michigan
- Coordinates: 42°06′21″N 84°14′56″W
- Country: United States
- State: Michigan
- County: Jackson
- Township: Columbia
- Founded: 1832

Government
  - Type: Village council
  - President: Estella Roberts
  - Manager: Matt Swartzlander
  - Clerk: Whitney Harbowy

Area
  - Total: 0.95 sq mi (2.46 km^{2})
  - Land: 0.94 sq mi (2.43 km^{2})
  - Water: 0.012 sq mi (0.03 km^{2})
- Elevation: 994 ft (303 m)

Population (2020)
  - Total: 1,313
  - Density: 1,400.4/sq mi (540.69/km^{2})
- Time zone: UTC-5 (Eastern (EST))
  - Summer (DST): UTC-4 (EDT)
- ZIP code(s): 49230
- Area code: 517
- FIPS code: 26-11000
- GNIS feature ID: 2397467
- Website: Official website

Brooklyn is a village in Jackson County in the U.S. state of Michigan. The population was 1,313 at the 2020 census. It is located in the Irish Hills region of southern Michigan, just north of U.S. Route 12 along M-50. The village is located within Columbia Township. Michigan International Speedway is just to its south in Cambridge Township.

== History ==
The village was founded by Calvin Swain, who filed the first land claim on June 16, 1832, and named his settlement Swainsville. In a town meeting vote on August 5, 1836, the community elected to change the town's name to Brooklyn. The town is named after Brooklyn, New York.

The area has historically been a summer vacation spot for residents of metropolitan Detroit who owned cottages near lakes in the area.

The Ford Motor Company Brooklyn Plant opened in 1939. It made parts for B-24 bombers during World War II. Then, after the war, it made components for Ford cars and trucks through 1966, when the plant was closed.

The Michigan International Speedway opened in 1968. It is used primarily for NASCAR events.

== Geography ==
According to the United States Census Bureau, the village has a total area of 1.02 square miles (2.64 km^{2}), of which 1.01 square miles (2.62 km^{2}) is land and 0.01 square miles (0.03 km^{2}) (0.98%) is water.

Brooklyn is located in a portion of central lower Michigan known for its lush, rolling green landscapes in the Irish Hills area of Southeast Michigan, which contains scenic lakes surrounding Hayes State Park, Watkins Lake State Park and County Preserve, and Cambridge Junction Historic State Park. The village is 14 miles (23 km) southeast of Jackson, 37 miles (60 km) southwest of Ann Arbor, 56 miles (90 km) southeast of Lansing and 60 miles (97 km) from Detroit.

=== Major highways ===
- US 12 (4 miles (6 km) south)
- M-50
- M-124

== Demographics ==
Historical population
Census	Pop.	Note	%±
1860	334		—
1870	544		62.9%
1880	470		−13.6%
1890	596		26.8%
1900	494		−17.1%
1910	662		34.0%
1920	611		−7.7%
1930	733		20.0%
1940	749		2.2%
1950	862		15.1%
1960	986		14.4%
1970	1,112		12.8%
1980	1,110		−0.2%
1990	1,027		−7.5%
2000	1,176		14.5%
2010	1,206		2.6%
2020	1,313		8.9%
U.S. Decennial Census

=== 2010 census ===
As of the census of 2010, there were 1,206 people, 577 households, and 306 families living in the village. The population density was 1,194.1 inhabitants per square mile (461.0/km^{2}). There were 661 housing units at an average density of 654.5 per square mile (252.7/km^{2}). The racial makeup of the village was 96.9% White, 0.2% African American, 0.7% Native American, 1.3% Asian, and 0.8% from two or more races. Hispanic or Latino of any race were 2.9% of the population.

There were 577 households, of which 27.0% had children under the age of 18 living with them, 34.7% were married couples living together, 13.5% had a female householder with no husband present, 4.9% had a male householder with no wife present, and 47.0% were non-families. 41.6% of all households were made up of individuals, and 22.6% had someone living alone who was 65 years of age or older. The average household size was 2.09 and the average family size was 2.86.

The median age in the village was 43.6 years. 22.7% of residents were under the age of 18; 7.7% were between the ages of 18 and 24; 21.8% were from 25 to 44; 24.9% were from 45 to 64; and 23% were 65 years of age or older. The gender makeup of the village was 43.4% male and 56.6% female.

=== 2000 census ===
As of the census of 2000, there were 1,176 people, 507 households, and 297 families living in the village. The population density was 1,171.1 inhabitants per square mile (452.2/km^{2}). There were 534 housing units at an average density of 531.8 per square mile (205.3/km^{2}). The racial makeup of the village was 97.96% White, 0.26% Native American, 0.51% Asian, 0.51% from other races, and 0.77% from two or more races. Hispanic or Latino of any race were 1.96% of the population.

There were 507 households, out of which 27.8% had children under the age of 18 living with them, 41.8% were married couples living together, 12.4% had a female householder with no husband present, and 41.4% were non-families. 35.9% of all households were made up of individuals, and 18.1% had someone living alone who was 65 years of age or older. The average household size was 2.22 and the average family size was 2.87.

In the village, the population was spread out, with 23.5% under the age of 18, 7.2% from 18 to 24, 27.8% from 25 to 44, 19.6% from 45 to 64, and 21.9% who were 65 years of age or older. The median age was 40 years. For every 100 females there were 81.8 males. For every 100 females age 18 and over, there were 74.1 males.

The median income for a household in the village was $31,964, and the median income for a family was $48,750. Males had a median income of $32,727 versus $22,083 for females. The per capita income for the village was $18,933. About 9.7% of families and 12.1% of the population were below the poverty line, including 25.1% of those under age 18 and 12.1% of those age 65 or over.

== Notable people ==
- Ethlyn T. Clough (1858–1936), American newspaper publisher, editor
- Vivian Kellogg, first baseman in the All-American Girls Professional Baseball League; lived in Brooklyn; the Vivian Kellogg Field was dedicated at the Columbia Little League complex.
