= Onsted, Michigan =

- Village
- Village of Onsted
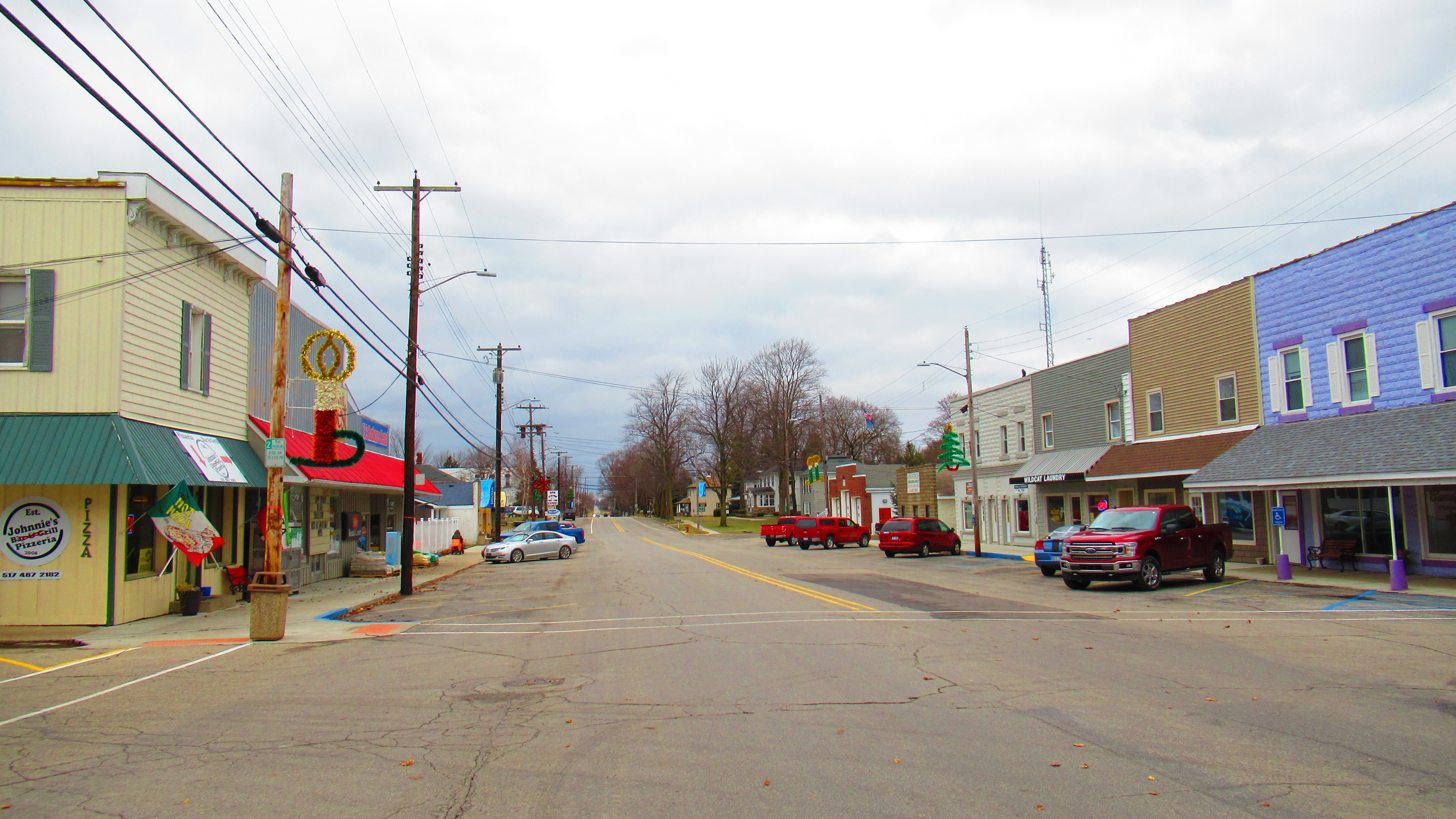
- Facing north along Main Street
- Motto: Gateway to the Irish Hills
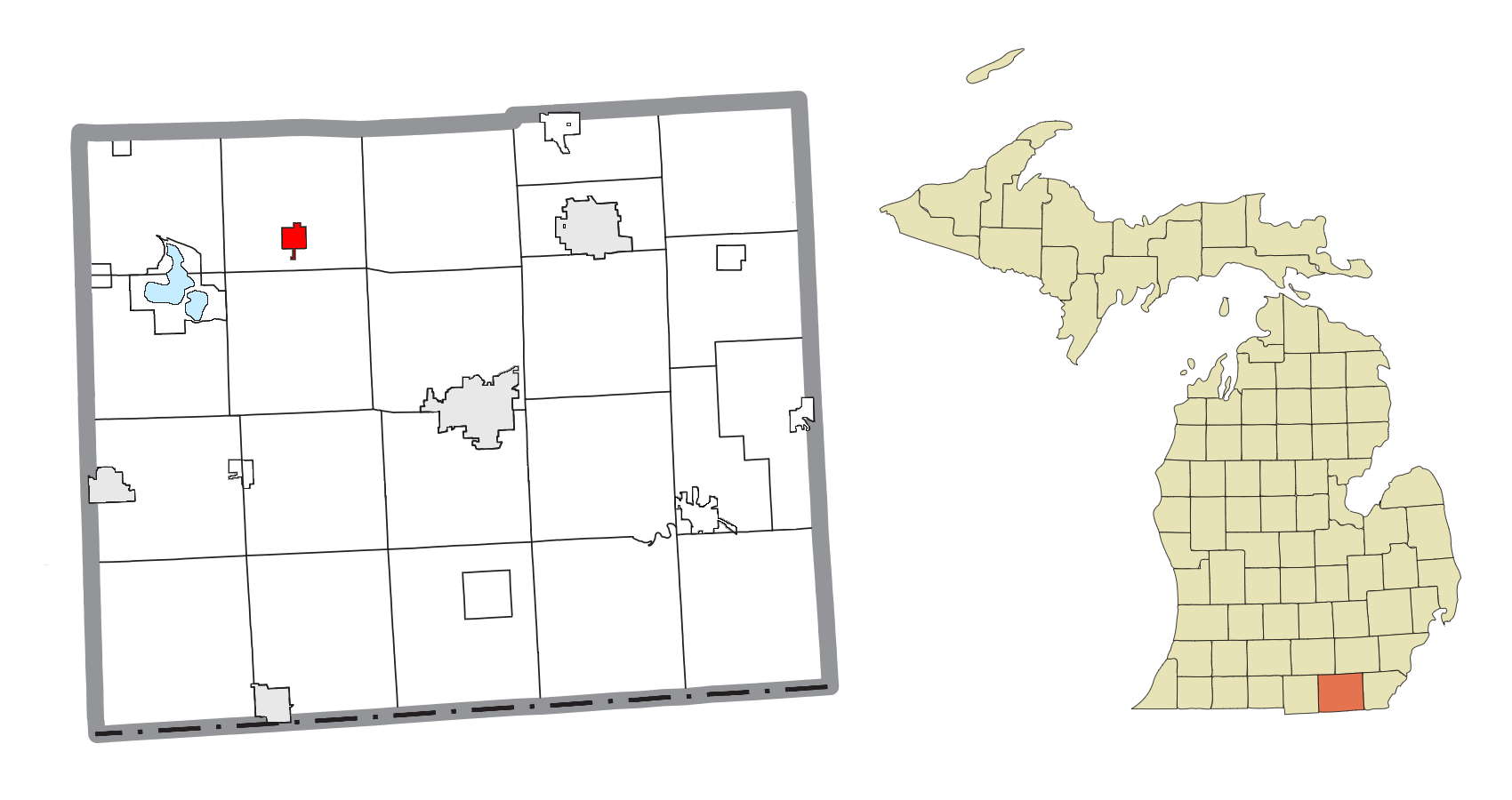
- Location within Lenawee County

- Location in Michigan Location in the United States
- Coordinates: 42°00′21″N 84°11′20″W
- Country: United States
- State: Michigan
- County: Lenawee
- Township: Cambridge
- Established: 1883
- Incorporated: 1907

Government
  - Type: Village council
  - President: Robert Schafer
  - Clerk: Annette Padley
  - Treasurer: Courtney Miller

Area
  - Total: 1.07 sq mi (2.76 km^{2})
  - Land: 1.07 sq mi (2.76 km^{2})
  - Water: 0 sq mi (0.00 km^{2})
- Elevation: 1,010 ft (308 m)

Population (2020)
  - Total: 988
  - Density: 926/sq mi (357.4/km^{2})
- Time zone: UTC-5 (Eastern (EST))
  - Summer (DST): UTC-4 (EDT)
- ZIP code(s): 49265
- Area code: 517
- FIPS code: 26-60840
- GNIS feature ID: 0634075
- Website: Official website

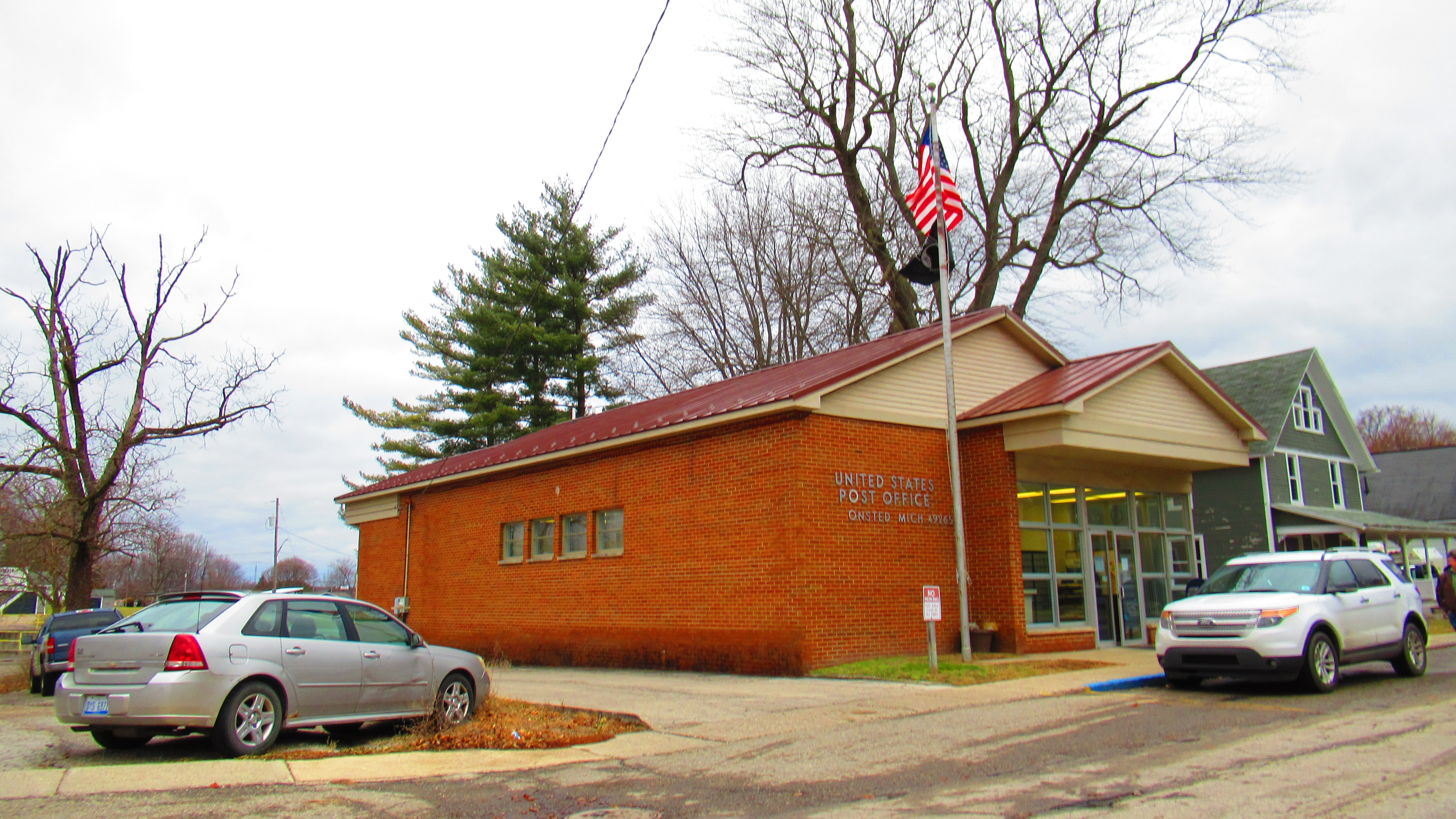
Onsted Post Office

Onsted is a village within Lenawee County in the U.S. state of Michigan. The village had a population of 988 at the 2020 census. Located within the Irish Hills region, the village is part of Cambridge Township.

Onsted was first settled in 1883 and named after early settler John Onsted. The community incorporated as a village in 1907.

== Geography ==
According to the United States Census Bureau, the village has a total area of 1.07 square miles (2.77 km^{2}), all land.

== Demographics ==
=== 2010 census ===
Historical population
Census	Pop.	Note	%±
1910	398		—
1920	323		−18.8%
1930	375		16.1%
1940	414		10.4%
1950	486		17.4%
1960	526		8.2%
1970	555		5.5%
1980	670		20.7%
1990	801		19.6%
2000	813		1.5%
2010	917		12.8%
2020	988		7.7%
U.S. Decennial Census

As of the census of 2010, there were 917 people, 370 households, and 253 families living in the village. The population density was 945.4 inhabitants per square mile (365.0/km^{2}). There were 399 housing units at an average density of 411.3 per square mile (158.8/km^{2}). The racial makeup of the village was 96.2% White, 0.2% African American, 1.6% Native American, 0.4% Asian, 0.2% from other races, and 1.3% from two or more races. Hispanic or Latino of any race were 1.6% of the population.

There were 370 households, of which 34.9% had children under the age of 18 living with them, 50.8% were married couples living together, 12.2% had a female householder with no husband present, 5.4% had a male householder with no wife present, and 31.6% were non-families. 28.6% of all households were made up of individuals, and 14.1% had someone living alone who was 65 years of age or older. The average household size was 2.48 and the average family size was 3.00.

The median age in the village was 39.3 years. 26.9% of residents were under the age of 18; 7.4% were between the ages of 18 and 24; 25% were from 25 to 44; 24.8% were from 45 to 64; and 15.8% were 65 years of age or older. The gender makeup of the village was 48.9% male and 51.1% female.

=== 2000 census ===
As of the census of 2000, there were 813 people, 321 households, and 227 families living in the village. The population density was 849.7 inhabitants per square mile (328.1/km^{2}). There were 343 housing units at an average density of 358.5 per square mile (138.4/km^{2}). The racial makeup of the village was 96.92% White, 0.12% African American, 0.62% Native American, 0.12% Asian, 0.25% from other races, and 1.97% from two or more races. Hispanic or Latino of any race were 1.97% of the population.

There were 321 households, out of which 38.3% had children under the age of 18 living with them, 53.9% were married couples living together, 13.1% had a female householder with no husband present, and 29.0% were non-families. 26.5% of all households were made up of individuals, and 14.0% had someone living alone who was 65 years of age or older. The average household size was 2.53 and the average family size was 3.09.

In the village, the population was spread out, with 29.9% under the age of 18, 6.5% from 18 to 24, 30.1% from 25 to 44, 19.4% from 45 to 64, and 14.0% who were 65 years of age or older. The median age was 36 years. For every 100 females, there were 85.6 males. For every 100 females age 18 and over, there were 75.9 males.

The median income for a household in the village was $34,539, and the median income for a family was $52,500. Males had a median income of $42,159 versus $24,554 for females. The per capita income for the village was $19,862. About 7.0% of families and 8.0% of the population were below the poverty line, including 8.2% of those under age 18 and 12.5% of those age 65 or over.
