= M-217 (Michigan highway) =

State highway in Cass County, Michigan, United States

M-217
- Michiana Parkway
- M-217 highlighted in red

Route information
- Maintained by MDOT
- Length: 1.653 mi (2.660 km)
- Existed: September 25, 2002–present

Major junctions
- South end: CR 17 at Indiana state line
- North end: US 12 near Union

Location
- Country: United States
- State: Michigan
- Counties: Cass

Highway system
- Michigan State Trunkline Highway System; Interstate; US; State; Byways
← M-216	→ M-218

M-217, also known as Michiana Parkway, is a multi-lane state trunkline highway in the U.S. state of Michigan. The Michiana Parkway, which extends into Indiana, was constructed as a joint effort of the Michigan Department of Transportation (MDOT), the Cass County Road Commission and the Elkhart County Highway Department. Michigan's segment of the parkway is 1.563 miles (2.515 km) long continuing County Road 17 (CR 17) in Elkhart County north into the state.

== Route description ==
M-217 starts at State Line Road on the Michigan–Indiana state line. It is the continuation of CR 17 that runs due north to an intersection with US Highway 12 (US 12) in Porter Township in Cass County. The highway crosses farmland between the two termini. In 2008, 4,239 vehicles used the highway on a daily basis in MDOT's average annual daily traffic (AADT) survey. The survey calculated how many vehicles used the roadway on average each day. The 2008 counts also showed that 75 trucks were included in the total. For 2009, the figured dropped to 3,738 vehicles and 67 trucks. M-217 is not listed on the National Highway System, a system of highways important to the country's economy, defense, and mobility.

== History ==
The Michiana Parkway was constructed from CR 4, just south of the "Elkhart East" interchange (exit 96) of the Indiana Toll Road, to US 12 in Porter Township, along the boundary with Mason Township. The Indiana portion was an upgrade and extension of Elkhart County Road 17 to the state line; Michigan's portion was entirely new construction built by the Michigan Department of Transportation and numbered M-217. With the completion of M-217, MDOT and the Cass County Road Commission swapped roads on September 25, 2002. MDOT took over jurisdiction of M-217 and gave M-205 to the road commission, an action that decommissioned M-205 as a state trunkline.

== Major intersections ==
The entire highway is along the Porter–Mason township line, Cass County.

mi	km	Destinations	Notes
0.000	0.000	CR 17 south – Elkhart	Indiana state line
1.653	2.660	US 12 – Niles, Sturgis	
1.000 mi = 1.609 km; 1.000 km = 0.621 mi
