= Irish Hills =

Rolling region in southeastern Michigan

Coordinates: 42°05′N 84°10′W

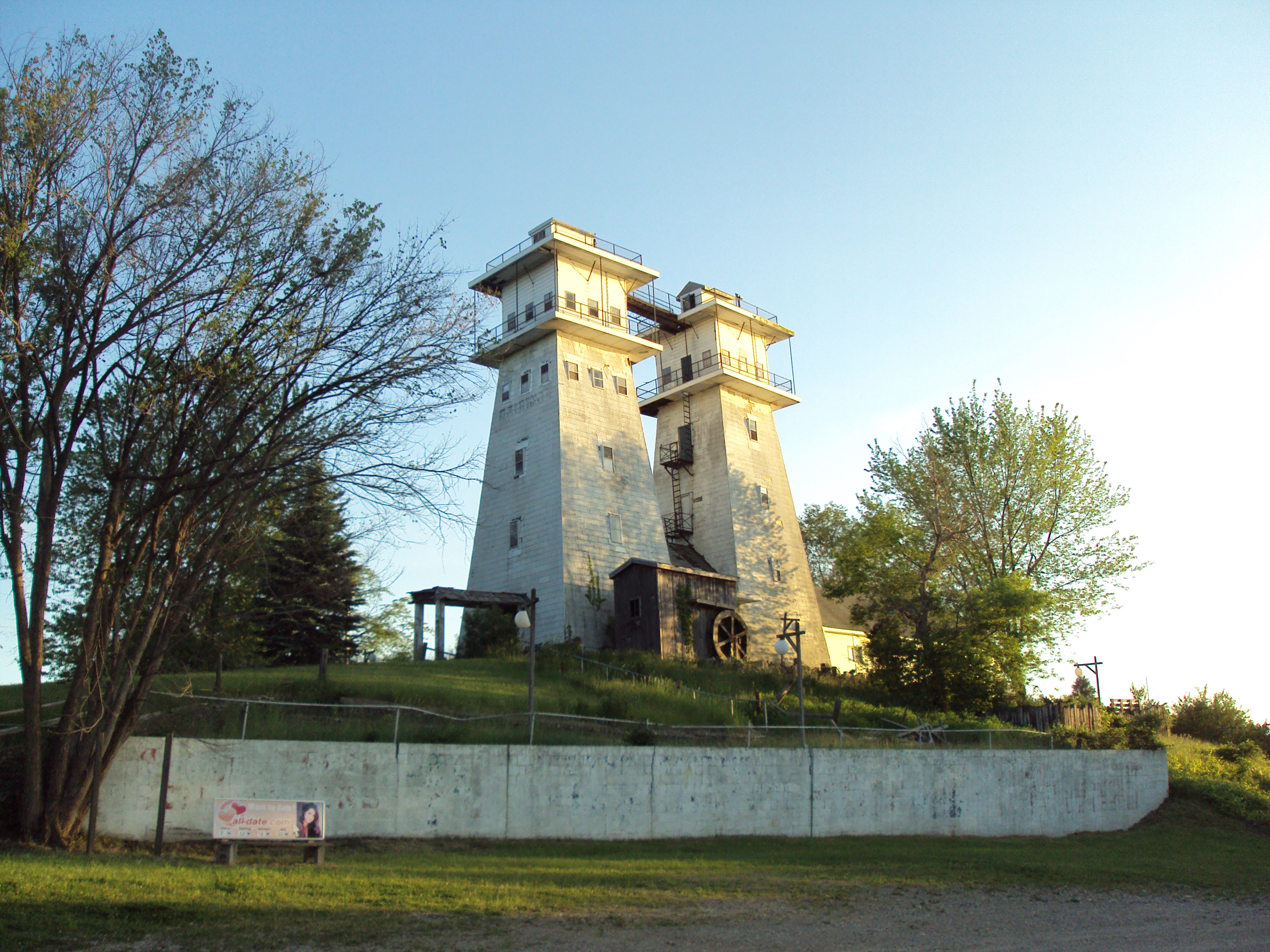
The Irish Hills Towers on US-12 west of Walter J. Hayes State Park

Irish Hills is an area of land located roughly in southeastern Jackson County and northwest Lenawee County in Southeast Michigan. It was named after the numerous Irish immigrants who settled there from 1830 until 1850. Today it is known throughout the state for its scenery, especially in the summer. Its hills and larger kettle lakes surround the 654-acre (2.65 km^{2}) Hayes State Park. It is also known for its chain of smaller kettle lakes bordered by US Highway 12 (US 12, Michigan Avenue). These link to Cambridge Junction Historic State Park, which is adjoined by the Michigan International Speedway.

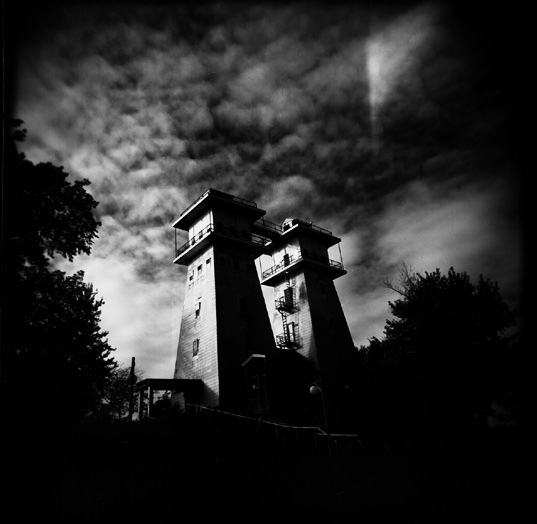
Twin towers in Irish Hills

Starting in the 1920s the Irish Hills has had several family-oriented roadside attractions, including an old west theme park known as Frontier City, a mock dinosaur exhibit named Prehistoric Forest, and a fairy tale themed park named Fantasy Land, all of which have closed. Frontier City saw some competition in 1965 with the opening of the Stagecoach Stop, a similar park with a better location. As of 2024, Mystery Hill, a gravity hill, is still in operation. Attempts are being made to save the observation towers known as the Irish Hills Towers. In the 1970s, Cedar Point acquired land in an attempt to build an amusement park, which would have complemented its location in Sandusky, Ohio. However, local residents spoke out against the project and it was eventually cancelled.

The Michigan International Speedway hosts NASCAR races, attracting over 300,000 fans a year during the racing season of June and August. The Michigan International Speedway also hosts the Faster Horses Music Festival and Nite Lights a drive-through winter holiday light display around Christmas.

Some towns in Irish Hills include Brooklyn, Napoleon, Norvell and Onsted.

== See also ==
- Tourism in metropolitan Detroit
- Southern Michigan
