= U.S. Route 12 in Michigan =

US Highway in Michigan

US Highway 12
- Iron Brigade Memorial Highway
- US 12 highlighted in red

Route information
- Maintained by MDOT
- Length: 210.077 mi (338.086 km)
- Existed: November 11, 1926–present
- Tourist routes: Lake Michigan Circle Tour; US 12 Heritage Trail

Major junctions
- West end: US 12 near New Buffalo
- I-94 near New Buffalo; US 31 near Niles; US 131 in White Pigeon; I-69 in Coldwater; US 127 near Somerset; US 23 near Ann Arbor; I-94 in Ypsilanti; I-275 in Canton; US 24 in Dearborn; I-94 in Dearborn
- East end: Michigan Avenue and Cass Avenue in Detroit

Location
- Country: United States
- State: Michigan
- Counties: Berrien, Cass, St. Joseph, Branch, Hillsdale, Lenawee, Washtenaw, Wayne

Highway system
- United States Numbered Highway System; List; Special; Divided; Michigan State Trunkline Highway System; Interstate; US; State; Byways
← M-11	→ M-12
← Bus. US 23	M-23	→ US 24
← M-111	US 112	→ M-112
← M-150	M-151	→ M-151

US Highway 12 (US 12) is an east–west United States Numbered Highway that runs from Aberdeen, Washington, to Detroit, Michigan. In Michigan, it runs for 210 miles (340 km) between New Buffalo and Detroit as a state trunkline highway and Pure Michigan Byway. On its western end, the highway is mostly a two-lane road that runs through the southern tier of counties roughly parallel to the Indiana state line. It forms part of the Niles Bypass, a four-lane expressway south of Niles in the southwestern part of the state, and it runs concurrently with the Interstate 94 (I-94) freeway around the south side of Ypsilanti in southeastern Michigan. In between Coldwater and the Ann Arbor area, the highway angles northeasterly and passes Michigan International Speedway. East of Ypsilanti, US 12 follows a divided highway routing on Michigan Avenue into Detroit, where it terminates at an intersection with Cass Avenue.

When US 12 was designated in Michigan on November 11, 1926, along with the other original US Highways, it ran along a more northerly course. It originally replaced sections of the original M-11 and M-17 along Michigan Avenue in the state, the route of the much older St. Joseph Trail, a footpath used by Native Americans before European settlement in the area. It entered from Indiana as it does now, but it followed the Lake Michigan shoreline farther north to Benton Harbor–St. Joseph before turning eastward to run through Kalamazoo, Battle Creek, and Jackson. In the Ann Arbor area, it followed a more northerly path into Detroit before terminating downtown. In the 1940s and 1950s, sections of the highway were converted into expressways and freeways. Starting in 1959, these freeway segments were renumbered as part of I-94, and, in January 1962, US 12 was shifted to replace US Highway 112 (US 112). That highway, when it was designated in 1926 replaced the original M-23 along the Chicago Road, which was the route of the older Sauk Trail. Later, US 112 replaced the first M-151 when the former was extended to New Buffalo in the mid-1930s. Since 1962, the highway has remained relatively unchanged aside from minor truncations in the city of Detroit. US 112 previously had two business loops, both of which were renumbered Business US Highway 12 (Bus. US 12) in 1962. In 2010, the Niles business loop was decommissioned, but the one in Ypsilanti remains. One section of the former US 112 was renumbered US Highway 112S (US 112S) for a few years in the 1930s.

== Route description ==
Between the state line near Michiana and the interchange with I-94 near New Buffalo, US 12 forms a portion of the Lake Michigan Circle Tour (LMCT). The full length of the highway in the state is also a Pure Michigan Byway. Outside of the various cities, most of US 12 is a rural, two-lane state highway. One section runs concurrently with I-94 south of Ypsilanti. From there eastward, US 12 is a divided highway and then a boulevard into the Detroit area. The entire length of the highway east of Coldwater is listed on the National Highway System, a network of roads important to the US's economy, defense, and mobility.

=== Southwest Michigan ===
US 12 enters the state of Michigan southwest of New Buffalo near the town of Michiana. The highway runs a bit inland and parallel to the Lake Michigan shore on Red Arrow Highway past the community of Grand Beach before turning eastward away from the lake on the north side of New Buffalo. US 12 intersects I-94 less than a mile (1.6 km) east of this turn and continues due east along Pulaski Highway through rural farmland. The highway is the main east–west street as it crosses through Three Oaks in southern Berrien County. East of Galien, the highway dips southward around Dayton Lake before passing south of Buchanan. The highway continues eastward, intersecting US 31 (St. Joseph Valley Parkway) near Niles. East of that freeway, US 12 expands into an expressway as the Niles Bypass. This bypass intersects M-139, crosses the St. Joseph River, and intersects M-51 on the south side of Niles. US 12 turns northeasterly along the bypass east of downtown and then departs to the southeast at an interchange with Main Street and M-60 just across the county line with Cass County.

Continuing through southern Cass County, US 12 runs roughly parallel to the state line. It turns northeasterly to run into Edwardsburg, where it intersects M-62. The highway turns southeasterly and runs to the south of Eagle Lake before entering the community of Adamsville. The highway continues on this southeasterly course until it intersects the former M-205 and M-217 (Michiana Parkway) near Union and turns to the northeast. US 12 intersects the southern end of M-40 before crossing into St. Joseph County at the eastern crossing of the St. Joseph River.

On the eastern side of the river, US 12 enters Mottville and intersects M-103. The highway continues as Chicago Road through farmland and intersects US 131 near White Pigeon. It runs along the south side of Klinger Lake and continues to a junction with M-66 in Sturgis; the two highways run concurrently for about eight blocks through town. East of Sturgis, US 12 turns northeasterly into Branch County. Still named Chicago Road, it passes through Bronson and past Batavia. Northeast of Batavia, US 12 intersects the eastern end of M-86 near Branch County Memorial Airport. The airport is on the western edge of Coldwater, and, after crossing the Coldwater River between Cemetery and South lakes, the highway runs through residential neighborhoods and into downtown. East of Division Street, Business Loop I-69 (BL I-69) follows US 12 through downtown and out to an interchange with I-69 on the east side of Coldwater. The highway continues past retail businesses and parallel to the Sauk River. US 12 passes through the town of Quincy before crossing into Hillsdale County.

=== Southeast Michigan ===
East of the Hillsdale County line, US 12 runs easterly into Allen, where it intersects M-49. The highway continues northeastward through farmland to Jonesville, where it runs concurrently with M-99 through downtown and across a different St. Joseph River. The trunkline continues northeasterly through northern Hillsdale County, crossing the South Branch of the Kalamazoo River in Moscow. US 12 runs along the south side of Lake LeAnn in Somerset Center in the northeastern corner of the county. East of Somerset, the highway crosses into northern Lenawee County.

Immediately east of the Lenawee County line, US 12 intersects US 127 in the Irish Hills region. South of Brooklyn in Cambridge Junction, it passes Michigan International Speedway and crosses the River Raisin next to a junction with M-50. East of the racetrack, the highway meanders through an area dotted by several smaller lakes until it intersects M-124 at Hayes State Park. Continuing as Michigan Avenue, US 12 angles northeasterly from the park until it hits the Lenawee–Washtenaw county line. The highway follows the line for several miles before reentering Lenawee County. It continues through an intersection with M-52 and into Clinton before turning northeasterly and fully crossing into Washtenaw County.

In Washtenaw County, US 12 passes through Benton in a rural southern section of the county. At Saline, the highway enters the suburban edge of the Ann Arbor–Ypsilanti metro area. US 12 follows Michigan Avenue northeasterly through Saline and across an interchange with US 23 before intersecting I-94 in Pittsfield and Ypsilanti townships. US 12 leaves Michigan Avenue to follow I-94 at that freeway's exit 181; Michigan Avenue continues into downtown Ypsilanti as a city street. I-94/US 12 skirts around the south side of the city and intersects the western end of Bus. US 12 at Huron Street south of downtown. The freeway continues around the south side of the city and rounds the north end of Ford Lake. It is bounded by residential neighborhoods, and it crosses the Huron River on the eastern side of Ypsilanti. Near the Willow Run industrial complex and airport, US 12 separates from I-94 and turns northeasterly along an expressway on the north side of the airport. There are three interchanges, including one for the eastern end of M-17 before US 12 crosses into Wayne County and intersects the eastern end of Bus. US 12.

=== East into Detroit ===
Once US 12 intersects the eastern end of its business loop, it returns to Michigan Avenue for the remainder of its routing in the state. The roadway is a boulevard in this area, a street divided by a central median. It runs through Canton Township and parallel to the Lower River Rouge. US 12 intersects I-275 on the eastern side of the township before crossing into Wayne. The highway is bounded by a mix of industrial and commercial properties in suburban Metro Detroit. In downtown Wayne, the two sides of Michigan Avenue split apart, surrounding the central business district of the city and separated by two to three city blocks. East of this split, Michigan Avenue crosses a section of Westland before entering Inkster.

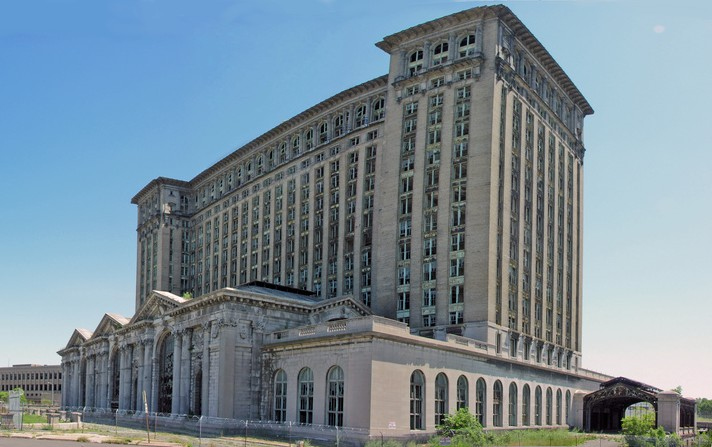
Historic Michigan Central Station along Michigan Avenue

In Dearborn, US 12 intersects US 24 (Telegraph Road) at an interchange on the western side of the city, and M-39 (Southfield Freeway) on the eastern side near the River Rouge crossing and Greenfield Village. On the Dearborn–Detroit city border, US 12 pass through a complex interchange with I-94 (Edsel Ford Freeway) and M-153 (Ford Road/Wyoming Avenue). Michigan Avenue continues northeasterly parallel to I-94 for a short distance before it turns due east. Once it makes the direction change, it forms the 0 Mile of Detroit's Mile Road System. US 12 continues through residential areas on Detroit's West Side, passing through the interchange that connects I-75 with I-96's eastern terminus near the Ambassador Bridge. The highway runs through Corktown and beside the site of the former Tiger Stadium at the corner of Michigan and Trumbull. East of the former stadium, US 12 crosses M-10 (Lodge Freeway) near the MGM Grand Detroit casino. East of M-10, Michigan Avenue enters Downtown Detroit. At the corner of Michigan and Cass, US 12 ends while Michigan Avenue continues several blocks further to terminate at Campus Martius Park at Woodward Avenue.

== History ==
=== Before 1926 ===
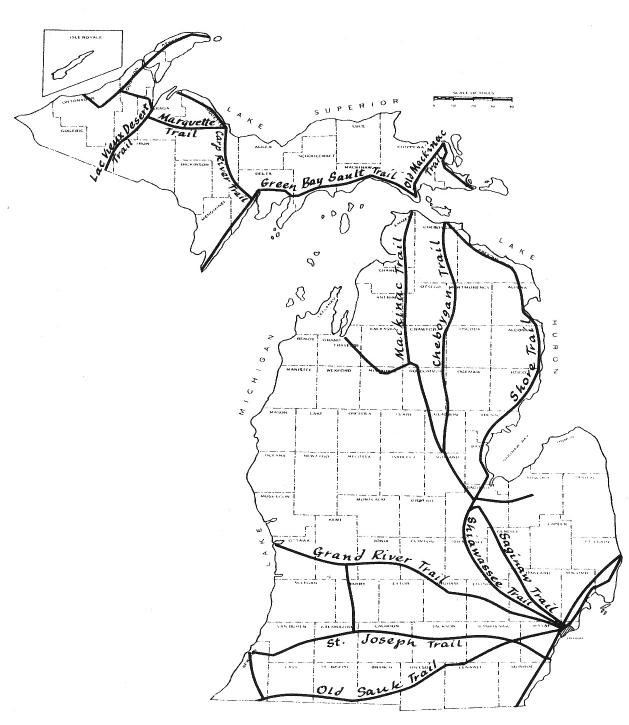
Map of the pre-statehood Indian trails

The first major overland transportation corridors in the future state of Michigan were the Indian trails. Two of these trails are relevant to US 12. The St. Joseph Trail ran between the Benton Harbor–St. Joseph area and Detroit by way of what is now Kalamazoo, Battle Creek, Jackson, and Ann Arbor. The second, the Sauk Trail, ran further south through what is now Niles, and Coldwater to the Ann Arbor area.

The Town of Detroit (Note: Detroit was incorporated as a town in 1802 by the government of the Northwest Territory before incorporation and reincorporation as a city by the Michigan Territory in 1806 and 1815.) created 120-foot-wide (37 m) rights-of-way for the principal streets of the city in 1805, including Michigan Avenue. This street plan was devised by Augustus B. Woodward and others following a devastating fire in Detroit, with a mandate from the territorial governor to improve on the previous plan. The wide width of the avenues was an emulation of the street plan for Washington DC and intended to make Detroit the "Paris of the West".

The southern of these two Indian trails later became the Chicago Road. Father Gabriel Richard, the first priest to serve in the U.S. House of Representatives, petitioned Congress to fund a highway between Detroit and Chicago in March 1824. A year later, the road was established in federal law, and it was surveyed by the end of 1825. Construction started in 1829, and the road was finished across Michigan in 1833. The northern Indian trail was established as an unnamed territorial road (later called Territorial Road) in 1829.

The State Trunkline Highway System was created on May 13, 1913, by an act of the Michigan Legislature; at the time, two of the system's divisions corresponded to the original US 12. Division 5 had a segment from New Buffalo to Benton Harbor and Watervliet while Division 6 connected Watervliet through Kalamazoo, Jackson, and Ann Arbor to Detroit. No divisions corresponded to the future US 112. In 1919, the Michigan State Highway Department (MSHD) (Note: The Michigan State Highway Department was reorganized into the Michigan Department of State Highways and Transportation on August 23, 1973. The name was shortened to its current form in 1978.) signposted the highway system for the first time, and the future US 12 corridor was assigned two numbers. From the state line north through Benton Harbor to Watervliet, it carried the original M-11 designation, and, from Watervliet eastward, it was the original M-17. From Dearborn into Detroit, the original M-10 ran concurrently along M-17.

M-23
- Location: Union–Ypsilanti
- Length: 130.223 mi (209.574 km)
- Existed: c. July 1, 1919–November 11, 1926

The future US 112 along the Chicago Road had two different numbers in the original highway plan. Between New Buffalo and Niles, the highway was numbered M-60, and, from Union to Ypsilanti, it was M-23. East of Ypsilanti, the corridor was part of M-17 and M-10. In November 1926, these two highway corridors were renumbered as part of the United States Numbered Highway System.

=== Original US Highway: 1926–1962 ===
On November 11, 1926, the United States Numbered Highway System was approved by the American Association of State Highway Officials (AASHO), (Note: AASHO was renamed the American Association of State Highway and Transportation Officials (AASHTO) on November 13, 1973.) and US 12 was the designation assigned to a highway running northeasterly from Indiana near Lake Michigan to Benton Harbor–St. Joseph and turning east to Detroit through Kalamazoo, Jackson, and Ann Arbor. This designation replaced sections of the original M-11 and M-17 through the southern part of the state. By the end of the next year, the MSHD rerouted the highway between Sawyer and Stevensville, and downtown Stevensville was bypassed in 1928. Additional work to fully bypass Stevensville was finished in 1929.

In 1931, the original routing of US 12 along a section of Michigan Avenue between Kalamazoo and Comstock was renumbered US 12A, and a new routing along King Highway south of the original opened. By 1936, another US 12A debuted in Battle Creek, and, by the end of the year, the main highway was rerouted between Augusta and Battle Creek. Another new segment of highway opened that same year east of Jackson, bypassing Leoni and Grass Lake to the north. This new bypass was extended eastward from Sylvan Township to bypass Chelsea to the south the following year, filling a gap in "super highway" (Note: Michigan State Highway Department maps of the time defined a "super highway" as one with "three lanes and over" on the map key.) segments between Jackson and Ann Arbor. The last routing change in the 1930s was the opening of Stadium Drive in Kalamazoo, after which US 12 was rerouted to follow it west of downtown.

In 1940, a southern bypass of Battle Creek opened along Columbia Avenue, and the former routing through downtown on Michigan Avenue became a Bus. US 12. In late 1951 or early 1952, a northerly bypass of Jackson opened, and the former route through downtown on Michigan Avenue became another Bus. US 12. By the next year, the western half of the Jackson bypass opened, including a bypass of Parma. In 1954, a new bypass of Kalamazoo and Galesburg opened; US 12 was rerouted to follow the new highway while M-96 replaced part of the old route and the US 12A in the area.

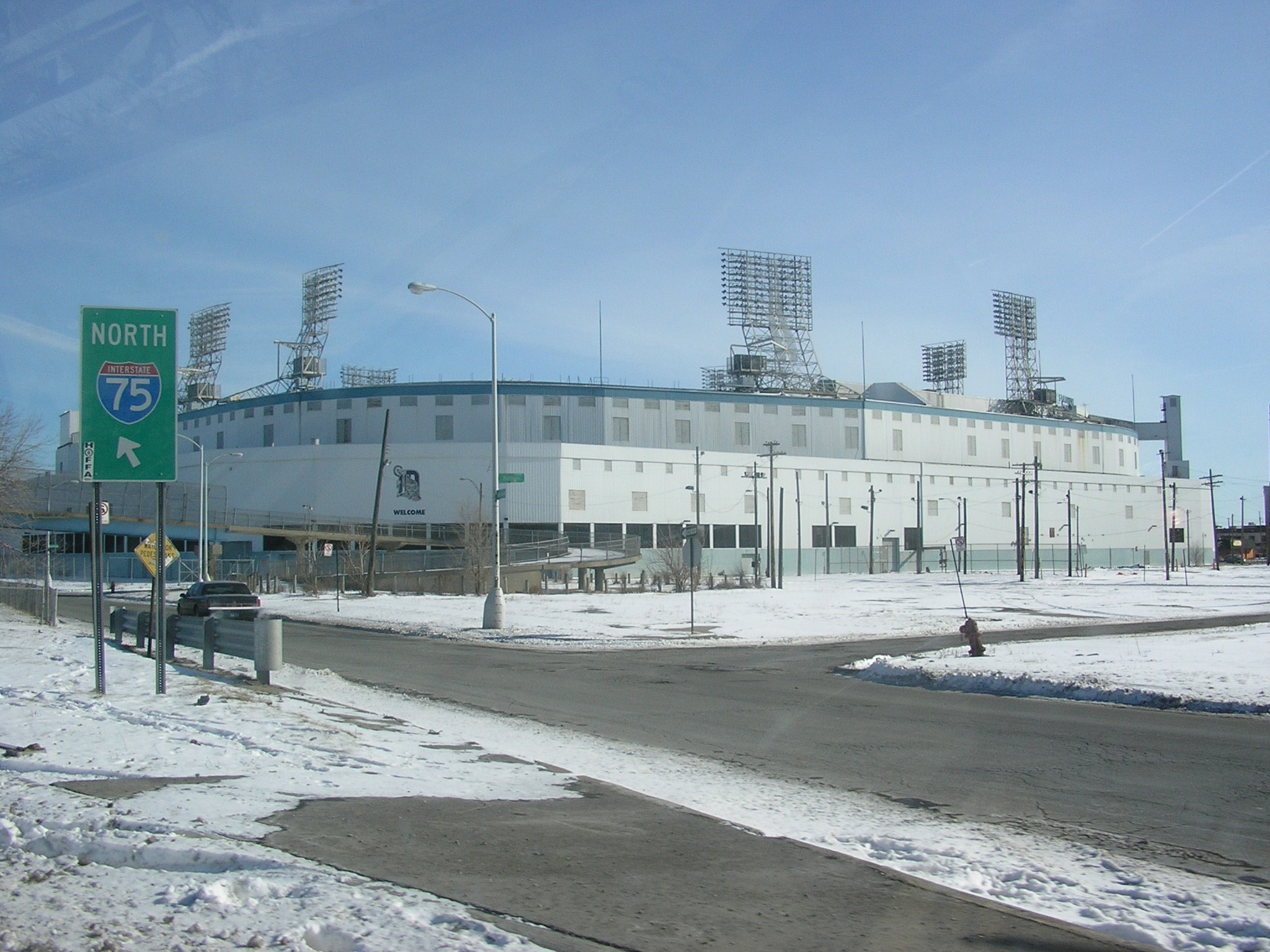
Tiger Stadium, former home of the Detroit Tigers at the corner of Michigan and Trumbull in Detroit (now demolished)

In 1956, several changes were made to US 12's routing. A southern bypass of Ann Arbor and Ypsilanti was converted to a freeway. US 12 was rerouted to follow the bypass, supplanting the M-17 and Bypass US 112 (Byp. US 112) designations used previously on the bypass. US 112 was also rerouted, and it ran concurrently with US 12 along the bypass. The former route of US 12 along Plymouth Road from Ann Arbor east to Detroit was renumbered M-14, and the M-112 designation on the Willow Run and Detroit Industrial expressways was replaced by US 12. At the same time as these changes were made, the Jackson bypass was upgraded to a full freeway. By the middle of 1958, the Kalamazoo bypass was converted to a full freeway.

Previously delayed so that the designations could be finalized, the MSHD started numbering its Interstate Highways in 1959, adding I-94 to the sections of US 12 freeway. Later that year, additional segments of I-94/US 12 were opened, starting with a 10-mile (16 km) section from Hartford to Coloma, then another from Paw Paw to Kalamazoo which connected with a segment between Galesburg to Battle Creek. The overall 45-mile (72 km) section from Paw Paw to Battle Creek was dedicated on December 7, 1959. By the middle of 1960, US 12 followed the I-94 freeway from Coloma to Watervliet and from Paw Paw to the east side of Jackson. It was also routed along the freeway from the west side of Ann Arbor into Detroit, where it followed the southern end of the Lodge Freeway. By the middle of 1961, the Watervliet–Paw Paw and Jackson–Ann Arbor freeway gaps were completed, and the freeway was extended westward to Stevensville. By the end of the year, I-94/US 12 extended all the way to New Buffalo. In January 1962, the state made the biggest rerouting change of all to US 12: the designation was removed from the I-94 freeway from New Buffalo to Detroit and shifted to completely replace US 112.

=== US Highway 112: 1926–1962 ===
US Highway 112
- Location: New Buffalo–Detroit
- Length: 205.507 mi (330.731 km)
- Existed: November 11, 1926–January 1962

M-151
- Location: Niles–Union
- Length: 17.376 mi (27.964 km)
- Existed: 1931–1935

In 1925, US 112 was originally proposed to run from Oshkosh to Fremont, Wisconsin, on what later became US 110. When it was initially designated in November 1926, US 112 made a sharp turn to the southwest to connect to US 20 in Elkhart, Indiana. In 1931, a new trunkline highway was designated between M-60 at Niles and US 112 at Union. This highway was numbered M-151. In 1933, the section of US 112 from Union to Elkhart was renumbered US 112S. M-151 and US 112S each lasted until 1935 when US 112 was extended to replace M-151. US 112 was also extended to run concurrently with M-60 to New Buffalo, and US 112S was renumbered M-205.

In 1936, the section of US 112 along Michigan Avenue east of Ypsilanti was expanded into a "super highway". In 1955, a realignment of US 127 in southern Jackson County removed a short concurrency with US 112 from Somerset Center in Hillsdale County and the current intersection in northwestern Lenawee County.

On December 1, 1956, the highway department opened the first 6.6 miles (10.6 km) of a new four-lane divided highway around the south side of Niles; the final 1.6 miles (2.6 km) of the bypass opened early the next year. Consequently, they converted the former route through town back to US 112/M-60 into a business loop numbered Bus. US 112. At the end of the decade, another highway concurrency was removed when US 131 was realigned to run directly south of US 112 to the state line instead of running concurrently along US 112 between Mottville and White Pigeon. In January 1962, the US 112 designation was eliminated when US 12 was shifted off the I-94 freeway to replace US 112. The state's rationale for the removal of the US 112 designation was the long-standing AASHO recommendation against US Highway designations extant in only one state.

=== After 1962 ===
After US 12 replaced US 112, the Bus. US 12 routes were renumbered as BL I-94, and the two Bus. US 112s were renumbered to Bus. US 12. In 1966, the state truncated M-60 and removed it as a concurrent designation along US 12 between New Buffalo and Niles.

In October 2000, the state proposed changing jurisdiction of several highways near Campus Martius Park in Detroit, and US 12 was shortened by four city blocks the next year to end along Michigan Avenue at Griswold Street. This would be shortened again in 2005 to Michigan and Cass avenues.

In April 2017, MDOT announced the reconstruction of US 12 east of Ypsilanti, which would reduce the route from a boulevard to a singular road along the existing eastbound lanes. This project would also eliminate an interchange with Wiard Road and allow the adjacent American Center for Mobility to use the westbound lanes as part of a facility to test automated vehicles. The project was projected to be completed that November.

== Memorial highway and byway names ==
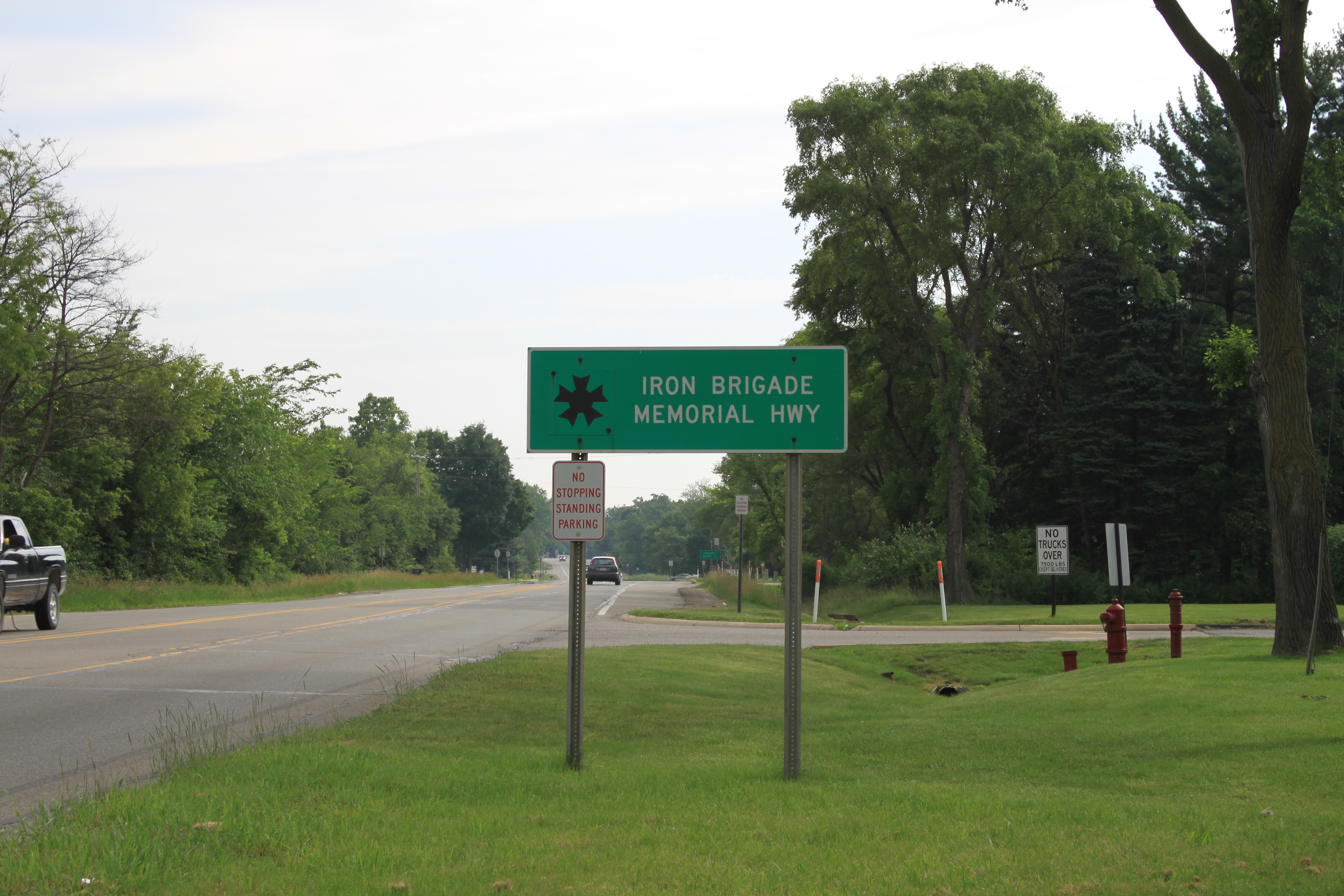
Iron Brigade Memorial Highway sign, Pittsfield Township

The roads that have carried US 12 in Michigan have been given a number of memorial highway names. In 1922, after the publication of Main Street by Sinclair Lewis, that street name took on a pejorative connotation. The newspaper in Jackson advocated that the main road from Detroit to Chicago which formed the main street through many communities in southern Michigan should be given a new name. It was already labeled the Michigan–Detroit–Chicago Highway on travel maps of the time, so the paper suggested that the roadway should be renamed to create the longest street in the country. Both Chicago and Detroit had streets named Michigan Avenue, so that is what the newspaper suggested for a new name. Albion was the first community to change the name of its street followed by Jackson and Marshall in 1924, Battle Creek in 1928, and Kalamazoo in 1929.

In 1952, US 12 was dedicated to the 32nd Infantry Division. The division used a red arrow as its insignia to symbolize how they pierced the German Hindenburg Line during World War I and Japanese defenses during World War II. The soldiers who composed the division were drawn from the Michigan and Wisconsin national guards. After other proposals failed, US 12 was named the Red Arrow Highway on August 30, 1952, and dedicated on March 22, 1953. Jurisdiction of most of the roadways that composed US 12 at that time has passed to local governments as I-94 was built, but the highway still bears that name in Berrien and Van Buren counties.

Count Casimir Pulaski was a Polish-born noble and soldier who fought on the side of the Americans during the Revolutionary War. He was appointed a brigadier general on the recommendations of George Washington and later became known as the "Father of the American Cavalry". He was severely wounded during the siege of Savannah and died while being treated on the brigantine Wasp. The route of US 112 was designated the Pulaski Memorial Highway by Public Act 11 of 1953 and formally dedicated in Detroit on October 4, 1953. The segment of what is now US 12 in Berrien County still bears this name.

US 12 has also been designated as the Iron Brigade Memorial Highway, a designation which it also has in Indiana, Illinois, and Wisconsin. The name honors the 24th Michigan Infantry Regiment, part of the Iron Brigade from the American Civil War. The regiment lost more troops than any other on the Union side during the war and provided the military escort for Abraham Lincoln's funeral in Springfield, Illinois. The unit traveled along the Chicago Road to join the war effort. The highway was dedicated in twin ceremonies in New Buffalo on October 9, 1994, and in Detroit on November 11, 1995, to the Iron Brigade.

In 1986, Michigan Department of Transportation (MDOT) consulted with its counterparts in Wisconsin (WisDOT), Minnesota (MnDOT) and Ontario (Ministry of Transportation of Ontario, MTO) about the formation of a circle tour around Lake Superior. The LMCT was signed on maps by 1988. In May 2001, the section of US 12 through Saline was designated a Michigan Historic Heritage Route. The segment through Clinton was given the same status in October 2002. On June 9, 2004, the full length of US 12 was dedicated as the US 12 Heritage Trail. In December 2014, this became a Pure Michigan Byway when Governor Rick Snyder signed legislation renaming the Michigan Heritage Route System to the Pure Michigan Byway System.

== Major intersections ==
County	Location	mi	km	Exit	Destinations	Notes
Berrien	New Buffalo Township	0.000	0.000		US 12 west / LMCT west – Michigan City	Indiana state line
Berrien	New Buffalo Township	5.758– 5.868	9.267– 9.444		I-94 / LMCT – Detroit, Chicago	Eastern end of LMCT concurrency; exit 4 on I-94
Berrien	Bertrand Township	26.260– 26.304	42.261– 42.332		US 31 (St. Joseph Valley Parkway) – South Bend, Holland	Exit 3 on US 31
Berrien	Bertrand Township	27.213	43.795		M-139 north (Chicago Road)	Former Bus. US 12; western end of Niles Bypass; southern terminus of M-139
Berrien	Niles Township	29.85	48.04	—	M-51 – Niles, South Bend	Former interchange, converted to at-grade intersection in 2024
Cass	Milton Township	31.413	50.554	—	M-60 east (Detroit Road) – Three Rivers; East Main Street	Interchange; US 12 departs via exit ramps, M-60 continues easterly past eastern end of Niles Bypass as divided highway; western terminus of M-60
Cass	Edwardsburg	39.901	64.214		M-62 – Cassopolis	
Cass	Mason Township	46.995	75.631		Old M-205	Formerly M-205
Cass	Mason–Porter township line	50.994	82.067		M-217 south (Michiana Parkway) – Elkhart	Northern terminus of M-217
Cass	Porter Township	55.473	89.275		M-40 north – Marcellus	Southern terminus of M-40
St. Joseph	Mottville	57.857	93.112		M-103 south – Elkhart	Northern terminus of M-103
St. Joseph	White Pigeon	62.742	100.973		US 131 – Kalamazoo, Middlebury	
St. Joseph	Sturgis	74.909	120.554		M-66 south (Centerville Road) – Lagrange	Western end of M-66 concurrency; to Indiana Toll Road
St. Joseph	Sturgis	75.419	121.375		M-66 north (Nottawa Street) – Battle Creek	Eastern end of M-66 concurrency
Branch	Coldwater Township	98.516	158.546		M-86 west (Colon Road) – Three Rivers	Eastern terminus of M-86
Branch	Coldwater	100.759	162.156		BL I-69 south	Western end of BL I-69 concurrency
Branch	Coldwater	102.203– 102.227	164.480– 164.518		I-69 – Ft. Wayne, Lansing BL I-69 south	Eastern end of concurrency BL I-69; exit 13 on I-69
Hillsdale	Allen	113.064	181.959		M-49 north (Allen Road) – Litchfield	Western end of M-49 concurrency
Hillsdale	Allen Township	113.589	182.804		M-49 south (Edon Road) – Reading	Eastern end of M-49 concurrency
Hillsdale	Jonesville	118.539	190.770		M-99 south (Carleton Road) – Hillsdale	Western end of M-99 concurrency
Hillsdale	Jonesville	118.879	191.317		M-99 north (Homer Road) – Albion	Eastern end of M-99 concurrency
Lenawee	Woodstock Township	136.114	219.054		US 127 (Meridian Road) to US 223 – Jackson, Hudson	
Lenawee	Cambridge Township	143.423	230.817		M-50 – Jackson, Monroe	
Lenawee	Cambridge Township	147.669	237.650		M-124 west (Wamplers Lake Road) – W.J. Hayes State Park	Eastern terminus of M-124
Lenawee–Washtenaw county line	No major junctions					
Lenawee	Franklin Township	154.540	248.708		M-52 – Chelsea, Adrian	
Washtenaw	Pittsfield Township	174.258– 174.278	280.441– 280.473		US 23 – Ann Arbor, Toledo	Exit 34 on US 23
Washtenaw	Ypsilanti Township	176.400– 176.419	283.888– 283.919	181	I-94 west – Chicago	Western end of I-94 concurrency
Washtenaw	Ypsilanti	178.211	286.803	183	Bus. US 12 east (Huron Street) – Ypsilanti	
Washtenaw	Ypsilanti Township	181.332	291.826	185	I-94 east – Detroit	Eastern end of I-94 concurrency; eastbound exit and westbound entrance
Washtenaw	Ypsilanti Township	182.150	293.142		M-17 west – Ypsilanti	Eastern terminus of M-17; former westbound exit and eastbound entrance, replaced 2022 by Michigan left
Washtenaw	Ypsilanti Township	182.527	293.749		Willow Run Airport – Plant Truck Access	Former Y-interchange with Wiard Road; replaced 2017–2018 by signalized intersection
Washtenaw	Ypsilanti Township	183.323	295.030		Willow Run Airport – Plant Traffic	Former Y-interchange
Washtenaw–Wayne county line	Ypsilanti–Van Buren township line	183.761	295.735	—	Ecorse Road –Willow Run Airport East and North Access	Eastbound exit and westbound entrance
Wayne	Van Buren Township	184.597	297.080	—	Bus. US 12 west (Michigan Avenue)	Channelized intersection, formerly a westbound exit and eastbound entrance
Wayne	Canton Township	189.537– 189.564	305.030– 305.074	—	I-275 – Flint, Toledo	Exit 22 on I-275
Wayne	Dearborn	198.478– 198.487	319.419– 319.434	—	US 24 (Telegraph Road)	Interchange
Wayne	Dearborn	200.353	322.437	Western end of expressway		
Wayne	Dearborn	201.506– 201.512	324.292– 324.302	—	M-39 (Southfield Freeway)	Exit 6 on M-39
Wayne	Dearborn	202.605	326.061	—	Greenfield Road	Interchange
Wayne	Dearborn	202.846	326.449	Eastern end of expressway		
Wayne	Dearborn	204.481– 204.497	329.080– 329.106		I-94 (Edsel Ford Freeway)	Exit 210 on I-94
Wayne	Detroit	204.718	329.462		M-153 west (Ford Road)	Eastern terminus of M-153
Wayne	Detroit	208.380– 208.413	335.355– 335.408		I-75 (Fisher Freeway)	Exit 47 on I-75
Wayne	Detroit	210.077	338.086		Cass Avenue	Eastern terminus of US 12; Michigan Avenue continues to Woodward Avenue
1.000 mi = 1.609 km; 1.000 km = 0.621 mi: Concurrency terminus; Closed/former; Incomplete access

== Related routes ==
=== Kalamazoo alternate route ===
US Highway 12A
- Location: Kalamazoo–Comstock
- Length: 3.767 mi (6.062 km)
- Existed: 1931–1954

US Highway 12A (US 12A) was an alternate route of US 12 in the Kalamazoo area. The highway followed Michigan Avenue from Kalamazoo eastward along the north side of the Kalamazoo River to Comstock, where it terminated at an intersection with M-96. The highway was formed in 1931 when US 12 was rerouted in the area. In 1954, the designation was decommissioned when M-96 was extended to Kalamazoo on the south side of the Kalamazoo River along King Highway.

Major intersections
The entire highway was in Kalamazoo County.

Location	mi	km	Destinations	Notes
Kalamazoo	0.000	0.000	US 12 / M-43 west – Kalamazoo	Western end of M-43 concurrency
Kalamazoo	0.196	0.315	M-43 east – Lansing	Eastern end of M-43 concurrency
Comstock	3.767	6.062	M-96 east – Battle Creek	
1.000 mi = 1.609 km; 1.000 km = 0.621 mi: Concurrency terminus

=== Niles business loop ===
Business US Highway 112
- Location: Niles
- Length: 5.505 mi (8.859 km)
- Existed: 1956–January 1962

Business US Highway 12
- Location: Niles
- Length: 5.327 mi (8.573 km)
- Existed: January 1962–March 5, 2010

Business US Highway 12 (Bus. US 12) was a business route running in Niles. The western terminus was at the corner of West Chicago Road and US 12 (Pulaski Highway) east of the US 12/US 31 interchange. From there, the business loop followed Chicago Road northeasterly through residential areas on the west side of town. Bus. US 12 turned north along Lincoln Avenue and then east on Main Street, crossing the St. Joseph River. The loop intersected the southern end of M-139 at Front Street one block east of the river in downtown Niles. Four blocks further east, Bus. US 12 met M-51. The two highways merged along Main Street and then turned south along 11th Street at an intersection that also marks the western terminus of Bus. M-60 (Oak Street). Bus. US 12/M-51 continued south along 11th Street to the corner of US 12 (Pulaski Highway) and M-51 (South 11th Street) where the business loop terminated.

The trunkline was first designated in 1956 as a business route of US 112. At that time, US 112 and M-60 were transferred to a bypass south of Niles. When US 112 was decommissioned in January 1962, Bus. US 112 was redesignated Bus. US 12 to match the new US 12 designation. In 1986, US 33 was truncated in Michigan to end at US 12. Bus. US 12 was rerouted in Niles to replace US 33 through town; Bus. US 31 was added a year later when the signage was updated in the area. In 1998, US 33 was removed from Michigan completely. At this time, M-51 was extended over former US 33 and replaced part of the Bus. US 31 designation in Niles. On March 5, 2010, the segment of Bus. US 12 between Bus. US 31 and M-51 was turned over to local control. In April 2010 the Bus. US 12 designation was retired when an extended M-139 replaced it from the local control section southwestward prior to maps and signage being changed. The concurrent segment along M-51 became M-51 only.

Major intersections
The entire highway was in St. Joseph County.

Location	mi	km	Destinations	Notes
Bertrand Township	0.000	0.000	US 12 – New Buffalo, Coldwater	
Niles	2.900	4.667	M-139 north	Southern terminus of M-139
Niles	3.145	5.061	M-51 north – Dowagiac	Northern end of M-51 concurrency
Niles	3.549	5.712	Bus. M-60 east	Western terminus of Bus. M-60
Niles Township	5.327	8.573	US 12 – New Buffalo, Coldwater M-51 south – South Bend	Southern end of M-52 concurrency; interchange on US 12
1.000 mi = 1.609 km; 1.000 km = 0.621 mi: Concurrency terminus

=== Ypsilanti business loop ===
Bypass US Highway 112
- Location: Ypsilanti
- Length: 8.023 mi (12.912 km)
- Existed: c. 1942.–1956

Business US Highway 112
- Location: Ypsilanti
- Length: 8.020 mi (12.907 km)
- Existed: 1956–January 1962

Business US Highway 12
- Location: Ypsilanti
- Length: 8.020 mi (12.907 km)
- Existed: January 1962–present

Business US Highway 12 (Bus. US 12) is a business route running in Ypsilanti. The loop starts at exit 183 on I-94/US 12 south of downtown Ypsilanti and runs northward along the one-way pairing of Huron Street (northbound) and Hamilton Street (southbound). At the intersection with Michigan Avenue in downtown, the two directions reunite and turn eastward, merging onto M-17 in the process. Michigan Avenue crosses the Huron River and continues due east until an intersection at Prospect Street where it turns northeasterly. M-17 separates from Bus. US 12 at Ecorse Road, and Michigan Avenue continues through commercial areas, exiting the city of Ypsilanti. Once Bus. US 12 crosses from Washtenaw County into Wayne County, it expands into a boulevard with Michigan left turns. Just north of the Willow Run industrial complex, Bus. US 12 terminates where US 12 merges onto Michigan Avenue.

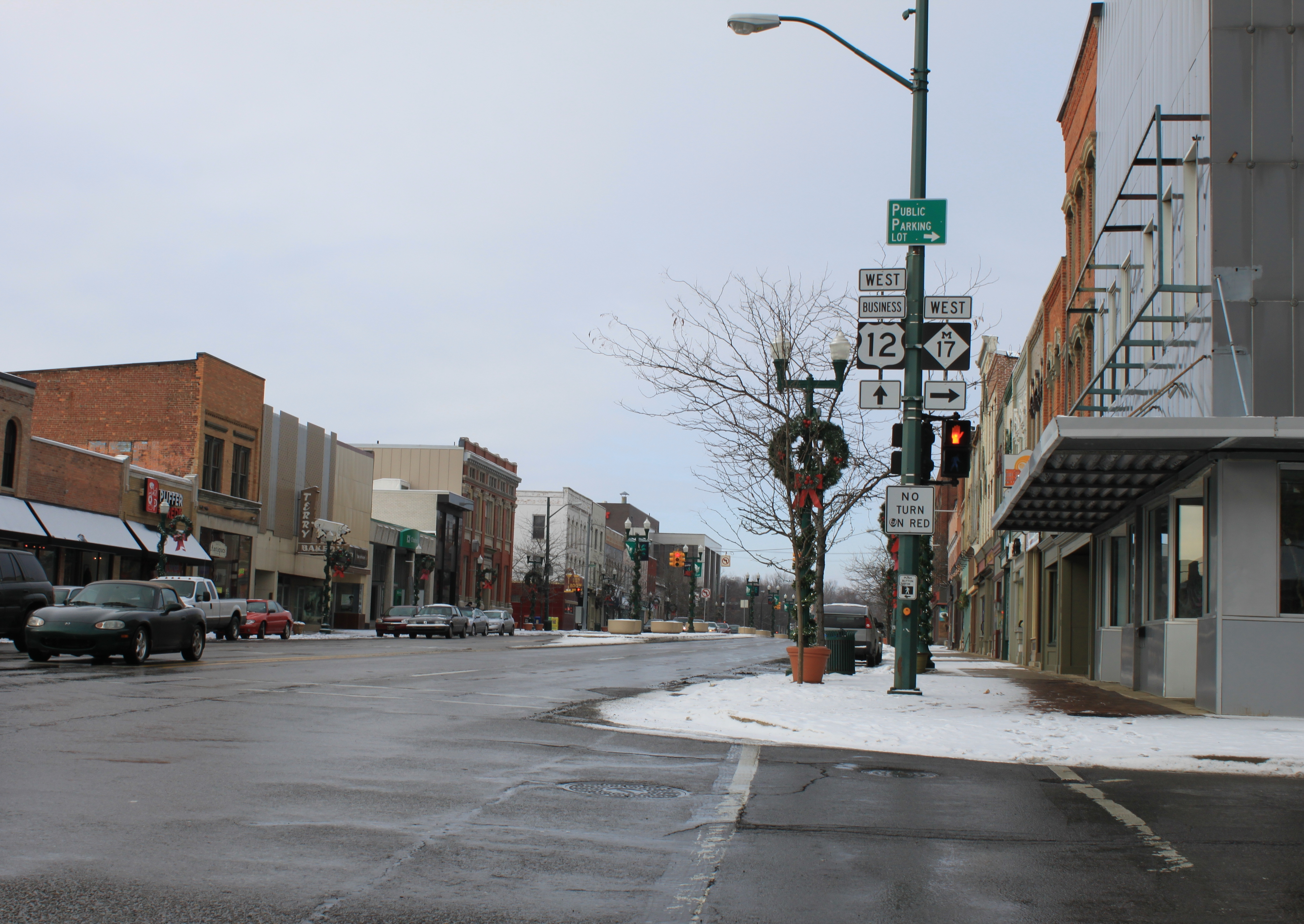
Michigan Avenue facing west, downtown Ypsilanti

In 1942 or 1943, Ypsilanti was bypassed by a Byp. US 112. US 112 continued to run along its routing in Ypsilanti. The first business loop in Ypsilanti was created in 1956 when US 112 was realigned to bypass downtown along the former Byp. US 112. The former route through downtown was then numbered Bus. US 112. The current designation was changed to Bus. US 12 in 1962 when US 12 replaced US 112.

Major intersections

County	Location	mi	km	Destinations	Notes
Washtenaw	Ypsilanti	0.000	0.000	I-94 / US 12 – Chicago, Detroit	Exit 183 on I-94/US 12
Washtenaw	Ypsilanti	1.104	1.777	M-17 west	Western end of M-17 concurrency
Washtenaw	Ypsilanti	1.774	2.855	M-17 east	Eastern end of M-17 concurrency
Wayne	Van Buren Township	8.020	12.907	US 12 – Coldwater, Detroit	
1.000 mi = 1.609 km; 1.000 km = 0.621 mi: Concurrency terminus

=== Suffixed route ===
US Highway 112S
- Location: Union, MI to Elkhart, IN
- Length: 8.68 mi (13.97 km)
- Existed: 1933–1935

US Highway 112S (US 112S) was a spur route of US 112 in the mid-1930s. Originally, US 112 turned southward at Union and ran to US 20 in Elkhart, Indiana. In 1933, this section of highway was renumbered US 112S, before US 112 was relocated to go through Michigan's southwesternmost counties in 1935. At the same time, US 112S was renumbered M-205, a designation it would hold until it was transferred to local control on October 10, 2002, decommissioning the trunkline.

== Notes ==
US Highway 12
Previous state: Indiana	Michigan	Next state: Terminus
