= Addison Community Schools =

School district in Michigan, United States

Address
- 219 N. Comstock St. Addison, Lenawee County, Michigan, 49220; United States
- Coordinates: 41.988796°N 84.344474°W

District information
- Grades: PreKindergarten–12
- Superintendent: Scott Salow
- Schools: 3
- Budget: $11,317,000 2022-2023 expenditures
- NCES District ID: 2601920

Students and staff
- Students: 682 (2024-2025)
- Teachers: 38.62 (on an FTE basis) (2024-2025)
- Staff: 99.07 FTE (2024-2025)
- Student–teacher ratio: 17.66 (2024-2025)
- District mascot: Panthers
- Colors: Red and Black

Other information
- Website: www.addisonschools.org

Addison Community Schools is a public school district in southern Michigan. In Lenawee County, it serves Addison, Manitou Beach-Devils Lake, and parts of the townships of Rollin and Woodstock. In Hillsdale County, it serves parts of Somerset and Wheatland Townships.

== History ==
Addison Community Schools was organized in 1886 under the direction of George Judson Tripp and marked its first official graduation exercises in 1887. Three participated in commencement that year, followed by one in 1888. Recently averaging 70 to 80 graduates each year, Addison's mascot is the Panther, they kept using that mascot for the 1948–49 school year. Prior to that, the school used the nickname Addison Millers, in honor of the village's young factory the flouring mill.

In 2012 the campus connected the new high school building and renovated elementary and middle schools. These buildings are now known as Addison Elementary School (Grades K-5), Addison Middle School (Grades 6–8), and Addison High School (Grades 9–12). As of the 2012–13 school year, the historic "Upper El.", previously the high school from 1925 to 1960 went under in 2009 to save the district money. The district superintendent as of July 1, 2024 is Scott Salow.

== Schools ==
Schools in Addison Community Schools district share a building at 219 North Comstock Street in Addison.

Schools in Addison Community Schools district
School	Notes
Addison High School	Grades 9–12.
Addison Middle School	Grades 6-8.
Addison Elementary	Grades PreK-5.
