= The Addison Courier =

Newspaper in Michigan, United States

The Addison Courier was a weekly newspaper first published on June 27, 1884, for the community of Addison, Michigan, and the surrounding farming community. It ceased publication on January 21, 1960. The newspaper is on microfilm at the Lenawee County Library.

== About the newspaper ==
The Addison Courier served what was called the tri-county area of Lenawee County, Hillsdale County, and Jackson County, Michigan. It used a broadsheet tab from 1884 until 1951, when it switched to a tabloid-sized format. Primarily serving the interests of Addison residents, from 1922 until 1924, the Courier covered the Onsted, Michigan area when its newspaper, The Onsted News, briefly ceased publication. After the Courier closed in 1960, The Brooklyn Exponent absorbed the Addison area and added it to its weekly news coverage full-time in June 1965. Local daily newspapers, the Jackson Citizen Patriot and The Daily Telegram in Adrian also regularly publish Addison news.
