= Devils Lake (Michigan) =

Lake in the state of Michigan, United States

Devils Lake is the name of a few lakes in the U.S. state of Michigan.

== Lenawee County ==
Devils Lake
- Location within Michigan Location within the United States
- Location: Manitou Beach, Michigan
- Coordinates: 41°58′51″N 84°18′39″W
- Type: Reservoir
- Primary outflows: Bean Creek
- Basin countries: United States
- Surface area: 1,330 acres (5 km^{2})
- Max. depth: 63 ft (19 m)
- Surface elevation: 1,040 ft (317 m)
- Settlements: Devils Lake, Manitou Beach

The largest Devils Lake is in Lenawee County on the boundary between Woodstock Township and Rollin Township. The community of Devils Lake is on the northern end of the lake and Manitou Beach is at the southwest end. Together, the communities are part of a census-designated place named Manitou Beach–Devils Lake that encompasses the entire lake and the smaller Round Lake to the southeast. The lake drains into Bean Creek on the southwest, just north of Manitou Beach. Bean Creek flows into the village of Addison about two miles (3 km) to the west and continuing south, ultimately turns into the Tiffin River after crossing the Ohio state line.

== Alpena County ==
In Alpena County, Devils Lake is a long and shallow marl and muck-bottomed lake on the North Branch of the Devils River within the Alpena State Forest. There is another, much smaller Devils Lake in Alpena County, on Long Lake Creek, about a dozen miles (19 km) to the northeast of the larger Devils Lake.

== Others ==
There are two other much smaller lakes called Devils Lake in Michigan:

- In Brookfield Township in southeast Eaton County at 42°26′14″N 84°44′16″W
- In Dayton Township in west central Newaygo County at 43°30′36″N 85°57′50″W

Devils Lake is also identified as a variant name for some other small lakes:

- Devils Bowl Lake in Corwith Township, Otsego County, Michigan
- Devils Bowl Lake in Watersmeet Township, Gogebic County
- Devils Hollow Lake in Columbus Township, Luce County
- Eden Lake in Eden Township, Mason County
- Flint Park Lake in the city of Flint
- List Lake in Elk Township, Lake County

== See also ==
- List of lakes in Michigan
