= Devils River =

Devils River is the name of several rivers. These include:

- Devil's River, Bulgaria
- Devils River (Jamaica)
- Devils River (Michigan)
- Devils River (Texas)
- Devils River (Wisconsin)
