= The Brooklyn Exponent =

Weekly newspaper published in Brooklyn, Michigan

- Type: Weekly newspaper
- Owner: Rex Crist
- Founder: Charles Clough
- Founded: 1881
- Language: English
- Headquarters: 160 S Main St, Brooklyn, MI 49230
- Website: theexponent.com

The Brooklyn Exponent is a weekly newspaper serving the communities in and around Brooklyn, Michigan and the Irish hills, Michigan. The paper also covers Irish Hills, Cement City, Michigan, Clark Lake, Michigan and Napoleon, Michigan areas.

== History ==
The Brooklyn Exponent was started on September 1, 1881 by Charles Clough. It was a five-column quarto, and independent on all public questions. It aimed to give a fair mention of local happenings, together with general international news. At his death on September 30, 1884, his widow, Ethlyn, took over the business and ran the newspaper for eighteen years.

In June 1965, The Brooklyn Exponent changed its production format from broadsheet to tabloid, and expanded its coverage to the Addison, Michigan, Onsted, Michigan, Manitou Beach, Michigan and Somerset, Michigan communities. Following the closing of the Grass Lake Times in 2021, the Exponent further expanded its coverage area to include the community of Grass Lake.

Matt Schepeler’s family published the paper for 66 years. In 2026, the paper was sold to businessman Rex Crist, owner of Meadowbrook Media.

== The Manchester Mirror ==
The Manschester Mirror is a newspaper serving the Manchester, Michigan, community since 2013. The Mirror is printed by The Brooklyn Exponent.

The Manchester Mirror was founded in response to the decline and then closure of The Manchester Enterprise. The paper transitioned from online to a weekly print edition in 2016 with a circulation size of 1500. The Mirror was featured on Michigan Radio in a conversation about the importance of local news.
