= Ethlyn T. Clough =

American journalist (1868–1936)

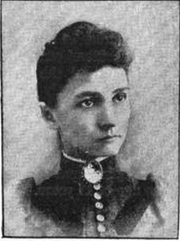
- Photo in Michigan Woman's Press Association, 1893
- Born: Ethlyn Theresa Packard; August 21, 1858; Monroeville, Ohio, U.S.
- Died: 1936 (aged 77–78)
- Resting place: Oxford Cemetery, Oxford, Ohio, U.S.
- Occupations: Newspaper publisher, editor
- Spouse: Charles W. Clough (m. 1876; died 1884)
- Children: 4
- Writing career
- Language: Englisy

Ethlyn T. Clough (August 21, 1858 – 1936) was an American newspaper publisher and editor. For eighteen years, she published The Brooklyn Exponent, a Michigan newspaper. She was the recording secretary of the Michigan Woman's Press Association (MWPA).

== Early life ==
Ethlyn Theresa Packard was born in Monroeville, Ohio, August 21, 1858. She was a daughter of Daniel and Cornelia (Hubbell) Packard. Her parents were natives of Ohio.

== Career ==
On July 21, 1876, she married Charles W. Clough, newspaper publisher, removing to Attica, Ohio. In 1878, they removed to Clinton, Ohio where the husband founded the Local. In 1881, her husband founded The Brooklyn Exponent. There being no other paper in Brooklyn, Michigan, and Mr. Clough being a practical printer, the location was most favorable for the establishment of a good weekly newspaper, and the Exponent soon commanded patronage and support. But, never robust, the hard labor soon began to tell upon him. At her husband's death, September 30, 1884, Mrs. Clough assumed the management of the paper, having learned how to manage a newspaper accidentally during her husband's lifetime.

Mrs. Clough, now a widow with four young children, was conscious of her abilities, and recognizing the necessity of having someone at the head of the business who would have a financial interest in its success, she at once assumed the responsibility of editor and publisher, and conducted the business, supporting herself and family of three children, one daughter, Adelaide M., having been adopted by her husband's sister at the time of his death.

== Affiliations ==
She was a charter member of the MWPA, and in 1890, was elected a member of the committee on constitution and by-laws, and in 1893, became the recording secretary. She also served as president of Brooklyn's Saturday Night circle, a member of the Bay View Reading Club, which focused on literary study.

== Personal life ==
Clough's sons and daughters were named respectively: Charles R., Adelaide M., Edward F. and Eleanor Maude.

She died in 1936 and was buried at Oxford Cemetery, in Oxford, Ohio. The Clough Memorial room of the Brooklyn (Michigan) Public Library was established in 1951 in her honor.

== Selected works ==
- Norwegian life. : an account of past and contemporary conditions and progress in Norway and Sweden. Ed. and arranged., 1909
- Oriental life : an account of past and contemporary conditions and progress in Asia, excepting, China, India and Japan, 1910
- Africa : an account of past and contemporary conditions and progress, 1911
- South American life : an account of past and contemporary conditions and progress in south america.ed.and arranged by Ethlyn T. Clough. , 1912
- German life; an account of the past and contemporary conditions and progress in Germany., 1913
