= The Daily Telegram =

Newspaper published in Adrian, Michigan

- Type: Daily newspaper
- Format: Broadsheet
- Owner: USA Today Co.
- Publisher: Dave Zewicky
- Editor: None listed
- Founded: December 3, 1892, as Evening Telegram
- Headquarters: 246 South Main Street, Adrian, Michigan 49221, United States
- Circulation: 2,425 (as of 2024)
- OCLC number: 33972687
- Website: lenconnect.com

The Daily Telegram is a daily newspaper published Sundays through Fridays in Adrian, Michigan, United States. Former owner GateHouse Media acquired the paper from Independent Media Group in 2000.

The newspaper covers all of Lenawee County and southern Jackson County, including "Adrian, Tecumseh, Blissfield, Clinton, Addison, Deerfield, Hudson, Morenci, Onsted, Brooklyn and all points in between."

== History ==
The first edition of the Evening Telegram was published on December 3, 1892. Inaugural publishers M.W. Redfield and Elmer E. Putnam said "particular attention will be given to events of a local nature." It competed with the Times and Expositor.

After several management changes the newspaper came under the ownership of David Grandon, prohibitionist publisher of a paper called the Weekly Michigan Messenger, who changed its name to the Adrian Daily Telegram beginning August 6, 1898. In addition to the new name, that day's paper announced upgrades to its printing plant.

In 1907, Grandon sold the newspaper to Stuart H. Perry. At that time, its circulation was reported at 6,000. In 1914, the former Times and Expositor, which by then was just known as the Times, shut down and was absorbed into the Telegram. Temporarily, the front-page nameplate would read "Adrian Daily Telegram and Times," but after several months the Times name was dropped everywhere except the masthead on Page 4, where the legacy of both papers would continue to be acknowledged through 1975.

Perry died in 1957 and the title of publisher passed to his son-in-law, C. Kenneth Wesley.

The Telegram was sold to Thomson Newspapers in 1964. At that time, the new owners announced that its offices would soon move to the former A&P grocery store at 133 North Winter Street.

Publication of the Adrian Daily Telegram was disrupted in late 1972 because of a strike. No paper was published from October 10 to October 23. The Telegram published a single edition on October 24 in which it detailed management's position on the strike by the Toledo Typographical Union Local 63 and the Toledo Newspaper Guild and said it would continue publishing. Beginning October 31, Thomson published a newspaper intermittently under the name Adrian News-Advertiser; 19 editions were published under that name before the Telegram resumed on January 8, 1973. Striking union members published in interim paper called the Maple City Reporter.

The paper changed its name to The Daily Telegram in 1973. In a front-page note, the paper explained: "Such changes are not made without careful consideration of the role and mission of a newspaper. Over the years The Telegram has expanded its circulation to the point where two-thirds of it is outside the city. As the county seat daily, it publishes considerable news of the work of the county agencies, courts and the county commissioners." At the same time, the paper switched from the old hot type printing method to cold type.

The Telegram was a six-day-a-week paper for its first 98 years, publishing Monday through Saturday. A Sunday edition was launched in April 1990.

The paper was sold to the Illinois-based chain Independent Media Group in 1997. In 2000, it was purchased by Liberty Group Publishing, an arm of a private equity firm. At the time, the Telegram reported a circulation of 17,000. Liberty would later be purchased by Fortress Investment Group and rebranded as GateHouse Media.

In 2018, the Telegram reported an average daily circulation of 8,570 on its Statement of Ownership, Management and Circulation.

Beginning in 2018, the Telegram no longer had its own editor, instead sharing a regional editor with The Monroe News. In 2019, GateHouse Media moved production of the Telegram out of Adrian and to a centralized hub. In July 2021, the building that the newspaper's offices had occupied since 1964 was sold at auction. In 2022, the newspaper started renting offices in a downtown Adrian co-working space.

The Telegram ceased printing a Saturday edition in March 2022.

In 2024, the Telegram reported an average daily print run of 2,245, of which an average of 1,910 copies were distributed. As of November 2024, its website listed two news reporters and one sports reporter.
