= Great Michigan Pizza Funeral =

1973 historical event

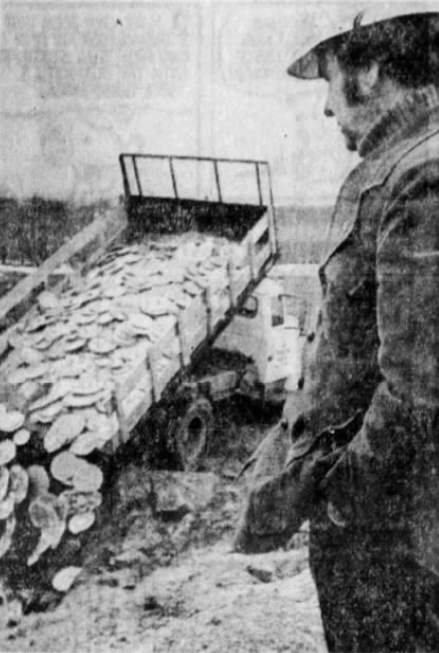
Ilario Fabbrini, owner of the frozen pizza manufacturer, watches the pizza burial.

The Great Michigan Pizza Funeral (also referred to as the Great Pizza Funeral of Michigan and the Great Pizza Burial) was the ceremonial disposal of 29,188 frozen cheese-and-mushroom pizzas in Ossineke, Michigan, on March 5, 1973. The manufacturer, Ilario "Mario" Fabbrini, had been ordered to recall the pizzas by the U.S. Food and Drug Administration (FDA) after initial tests suggested the presence of botulism-causing bacteria in a batch of canned mushrooms used to make the pizza.

Fabbrini decided to ceremonially dispose of the pizzas to demonstrate accountability and receive publicity. The pizzas were tipped into an 18-foot (5.5 m) deep hole in the ground before a crowd of onlookers, who were addressed by Michigan governor William Milliken. Later tests by the Food and Drug Administration ruled out botulism. Notwithstanding, Fabbrini sued his suppliers, and the Michigan Court of Appeals awarded him $211,000 in 1979 (equivalent to $936,000 in 2025), though he closed his business a few years later.

== Background ==
Ilario Fabbrini came from Rijeka, Croatia. Having lived under fascist Italian rule and then in communist Yugoslavia, he emigrated to the United States after World War II. Settling in Ossineke, Michigan, he began making and selling frozen pizzas from his home kitchen. Fabbrini's wife, Olga, helped him adapt the traditional recipes of his hometown to suit American tastes. Within nine years, Fabbrini had grown his business, Papa Fabbrini Pizzas, into one of the most modern pizza factories in the country. His plant, which employed 22 people, could produce 45,000 pizzas a week.

== Alleged botulism contamination ==
In January 1973, employees at the United Canning Company of East Palestine, Ohio, noticed several cans of mushrooms were swelling, indicating contamination. The plant had recently switched to an automated can-filling line, which was less sterile than the previous method of hand-filling, and also led to some overfilling of the cans. United Canning notified the Food and Drug Administration (FDA), which took samples for testing.

The FDA stated that their tests confirmed the presence of botulism, a potentially fatal disease in humans. The customers of United Canning were contacted by the FDA, including Tolono Pizza Products, a Chicago wholesaler who had sold the mushrooms to Fabbrini. Fabbrini was himself contacted by the FDA on February 19, 1973, and told to recall his products.

Fabbrini estimated that 30,000 pizzas were involved, costing him $30,000 and a retail value of around $60,000. This was the largest recall of pizzas in American history then. The FDA found no evidence of illness caused by Fabbrini's pizzas, although 17 claims were made by members of the public.

== Disposal ==
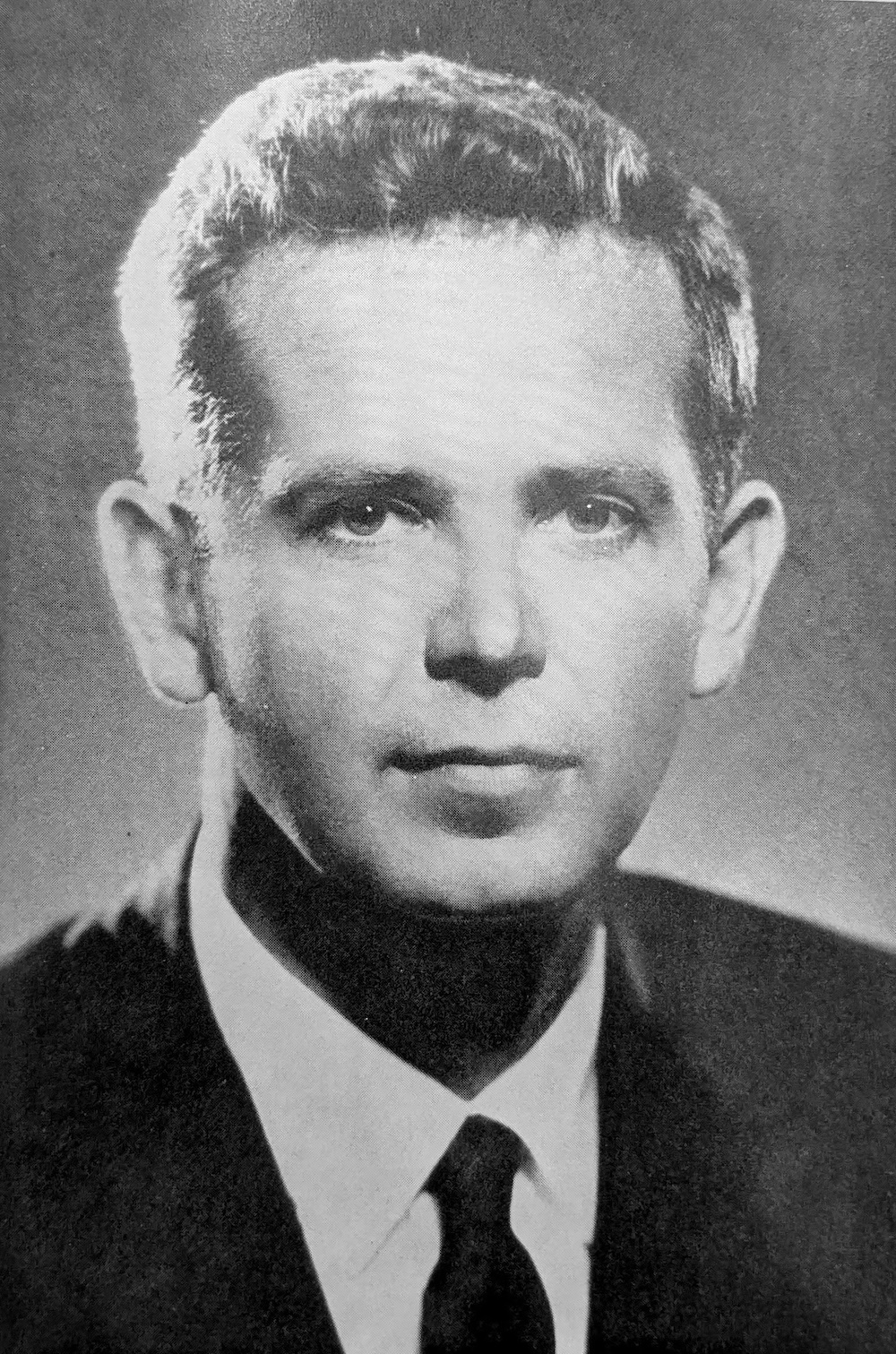
William Milliken, governor of Michigan, attended the event.

As a means of creating publicity and a demonstration of his accountability, Fabbrini organized a public disposal of the recalled pizzas on March 5, 1973. Fabbrini themed the occasion as a funeral, and it was later referred to as the "Great Michigan Pizza Funeral", the "Great Pizza Funeral of Michigan" and the "Great Pizza Burial".

Several hundred people attended the event at a time when Ossineke was a village of only 1,800 inhabitants. The press reported that 40,000 or 44,000 pizzas were buried, though, in later court documents, Fabbrini claimed to have only disposed of 29,188. The pizzas were tipped into an 18-foot (5.5 m) deep hole from four dump trucks. They were still enclosed in their cellophane wrappers.

After the burial, Fabbrini laid a wreath of red gladioli and white carnations on the grave, which a report in Atlas Obscura claims represented the colors of pizza sauce and cheese. The event was attended by Michigan governor William Milliken who gave a homily on the subject of courage in the face of tragedy. Pizza was served at the funeral. Governor Milliken was presented with a frozen pizza by Fabbrini, who cooked pizzas on-site to feed the attendees. When one attendee questioned the safety of eating the food offered, Fabbrini retorted, "Gov. Milliken ate a piece, and he's still alive".

The pizzas were memorialized with a mock obituary.

== Aftermath ==
Although he stated he did not blame his suppliers and would continue to use them, Fabbrini filed a $1,000,000 lawsuit against United Canning and Tolono Pizza Products. The case was finally settled in the Michigan Court of Appeals in 1979, with Fabbrini receiving $211,000. Around a third of the award was needed to pay Fabbrini's legal costs. After the recall, the Company struggled. In the early 1980s, Papa Fabbrini Pizzas went out of business, with Fabbrini selling its operation and assets for $5,000. The successor company went out of business shortly after the acquisition.

The initial FDA test results were overturned upon further investigation by the FDA and the Michigan state veterinarian. The deaths of the laboratory mice used in the tests were confirmed to be from an unrelated peritonitis case rather than botulism.

== See also ==
- 1971 Bon Vivant botulism incident
- List of food contamination incidents
