= Steve Moore (basketball) =

American basketball coach (born 1952)

Biographical details
- Born: May 6, 1952 (age 74); Monroeville, Ohio, U.S.

Playing career
- 1970–1974: Wittenberg
- Positions: Point guard, Shooting guard

Coaching career (HC unless noted)

College
- 1976–1981: Wittenberg (assistant)
- 1981–1987: Muhlenberg
- 1987–2020: Wooster

Head coaching record
- Overall: 867–253

Accomplishments and honors

Awards
- 9× NCAC Coach of the Year (1991, 1992, 1998–2000, 2003, 2007, 2014, 2019)

Steve Moore (born May 6, 1952) is an American retired college basketball head coach. In his 39-year career, he coached at two schools: Muhlenberg College (1981–1987) and The College of Wooster (1987–2020).

== Career ==
A native of Monroeville, Ohio, Moore played college basketball at Wittenberg University, graduating in 1974. He won three OAC championship titles.

Moore kicked off his coaching career at Springfield Catholic Central High School, where he coached junior varsity basketball in 1974-75 while teaching mathematics. He then attended Ohio University in the 1975-76 season, where he served as a volunteer graduate assistant and coached Ohio's junior varsity walk-on team, while completing his master's degree in Physical education. From 1976 to 1981, he served as an assistant coach at Wittenberg, helping the team capture an NCAA Division III national championship in 1977 under coach Larry Hunter. From 1981 to 1987, he was the head coach of Muhlenberg College, where he recorded 87 wins and 65 defeats.

In 1987, Moore was named head men's basketball coach of The College of Wooster. Moore retired from coaching following the Fighting Scots' loss in the first round of the 2019-20 NCAA Division III basketball tournament. When he retired in 2020, Moore had a record of 867 wins and 253 losses (780-188 at Wooster), ranking 12th in all-time men's basketball wins, regardless of division. He also was second all-time in games won in the NCAA Division III, when leaving Wooster. While at Wooster, his players received a total of 21 All-America accolades. Under Moore's guidance, Wooster had a record of 522 wins and 113 victories in the 2000s, which made the Fighting Scots the winningest NCAA Division III team of the century.

Moore was named North Coast Athletic Conference (NCAC) Coach of the Year nine times and is a five-time NABC Great Lakes District Coach of the Year. In 2008, he was presented with NABC's "Guardians of the Game" award.

Some of Moore's players went on to play professionally after leaving Wooster, including players like Tom Port (played in Iceland and Ireland), James Cooper (played in Germany), Evan Pannell (played in Canada) and Mike Trimmer (played in European and South American countries).

Other Wooster standouts of the Moore era include players like Bryan Nelson (2003 NCAA Division III Player of the Year, by NABC), Erich Riebe, Ian Franks, Ryan Gorman, Dan Fanelly, Stan Aukamp, Justin Hallowell, Danyon Hempy, John Ellenwood and Doug Thorpe. Riebe was Moore's first recruit at Wooster. Being able to get a player like Riebe "changed Wooster basketball forever", according to Moore's longtime assistant coach (later associate head coach and his successor as head coach), Doug Cline. As a coach, Moore was known to exemplify the intensity he expected from his players. Before a game against rival Wittenberg in 2001, Moore ended up breaking his hand in practice when diving for a ball in order to demonstrate to his players the type of intensity he was looking for.

== See also ==
- List of college men's basketball coaches with 600 wins
