= Wooster Fighting Scots =

- University: College of Wooster
- Conference: NCAA
- Division: Division III
- Football stadium: John P. Papp Stadium
- Basketball arena: Timken Gymnasium
- Baseball stadium: Art Murray Field
- Softball stadium: Galpin Park
- Soccer stadium: Carl Dale Field
- Golf course: L.C. Boles Course
- Tennis venue: Wooster Tennis Courts
- Outdoor track and field venue: Carl Munson Track
- Volleyball arena: Timken Gymnasium
- Nickname: Fighting Scots
- Colors: Black and gold
- Website: www.woosterathletics.com

The Wooster Fighting Scots are the athletics teams of the College of Wooster, located in Wooster, Ohio. The university is member of the Division III level of the National Collegiate Athletic Association (NCAA), competing in the North Coast Athletic Conference (NCAC).

== History ==
Wooster's athletic history dates back to its first baseball team, in 1880, which played only one game, losing 12–2 to Kenyon College. The football program was established in 1889; over its first two seasons, the team won all seven games it played, by a total score of 306–4. Included was a 64–0 victory at Ohio State on November 1, 1890, in the Buckeyes' first-ever home football game. Shortly thereafter, intercollegiate sports were banned by the College President.

After varsity athletics returned in 1901, Wooster became an early member of the Ohio Athletic Conference (OAC). In 1983, Wooster (along with the rest of the Ohio Five) broke away from the OAC to form the North Coast Athletic Conference (NCAC). The NCAC, which competes at the non-scholarship Division III level of the NCAA, was founded primarily on the principle of offering women equal opportunity to participate in varsity sports. In its first season of competition, 1984–85, the NCAC sponsored 21 sports, eleven for men and ten for women. Women's softball was added in 1998, and women's golf in 2010, giving the NCAC its current 23 sports. Wooster fields varsity athletic teams in all 23 of these sports.

== Varsity sports ==
Men's sports	Women's sports
Baseball	Basketball
Basketball	Cross country
Cross country	Field hockey
Football	Golf
Golf	Lacrosse
Lacrosse	Soccer
Soccer	Softball
Swimming	Swimming
Tennis	Tennis
Track and field	Track and field
	Volleyball

=== Baseball ===
The baseball team has made six appearances in the NCAA Division III World Series, most recently in 2018, including second-place finishes in 1997 and 2009. During the 1982-2019 career of head coach Tim Pettorini, Wooster won 19 conference championships and made 25 appearances in the NCAA D3 baseball tournament. A 2024 American Baseball Coaches Association Hall of Fame inductee, Pettorini won 1243 games over his 38 seasons leading the program, placing him in the all-time top five among D-III baseball coaches. During the first decade of the 21st century, the Scots had a record of 372–98, winning more games than any other team in Division III, and were second in winning percentage over that span, trailing only The College of St. Scholastica.

Fourteen Fighting Scots have been selected in the MLB draft since 1970. Among them was Michael Wielansky (2018), who eventually reached the AAA level in the Houston Astros organization.

=== Basketball ===
Wooster has a long tradition of success in men's basketball, with the team ranking #2 in all-time wins among current NCAA Division III programs. The court is named for retired men's head coach Steve Moore, who won 780 games at Wooster over a 33-season career concluding in 2020, ranking second all-time in NCAA Division III history. Moore led the Scots to 28 NCAA D3 tournament berths, including in each of his final 18 seasons, the longest-ever such streak in D3 men's basketball. Under his leadership, Wooster advanced to the 2011 national championship game, falling to St. Thomas (Minnesota), which moved up to D1 a few years later. Scots teams also made D3 "Final Four" appearances in 2003 and 2007.

Steve Moore Court is located inside Timken Gymnasium, which opened in 1973 and currently seats 2,600 after a complete renovation in 2018. Wooster has annually ranked among the national leaders in D3 men's basketball attendance for decades. Post-season tournament contests and the rivalry games against rival Wittenberg University draw the largest crowds, including fans from the campus and local community.

=== Football ===
Charles Follis, the first black professional football player, attended the University of Wooster and starred on the baseball team before signing with the Shelby Athletic Club to play professional football in 1902. Wooster was the last State of Ohio team not to be beaten by Ohio State, when it tied the Buckeyes at home on November 1, 1924. (as of 2018)

The 1905 football team

The football team's greatest success occurred between 1916 and 1934; during this era, Wooster had a record of 118–31–12, and won four outright OAC championships. The 1934 title would be the Scots' last outright conference championship for 70 years, with only a trio of shared conference titles (1959/1970 OAC and 1997 NCAC) during that time.

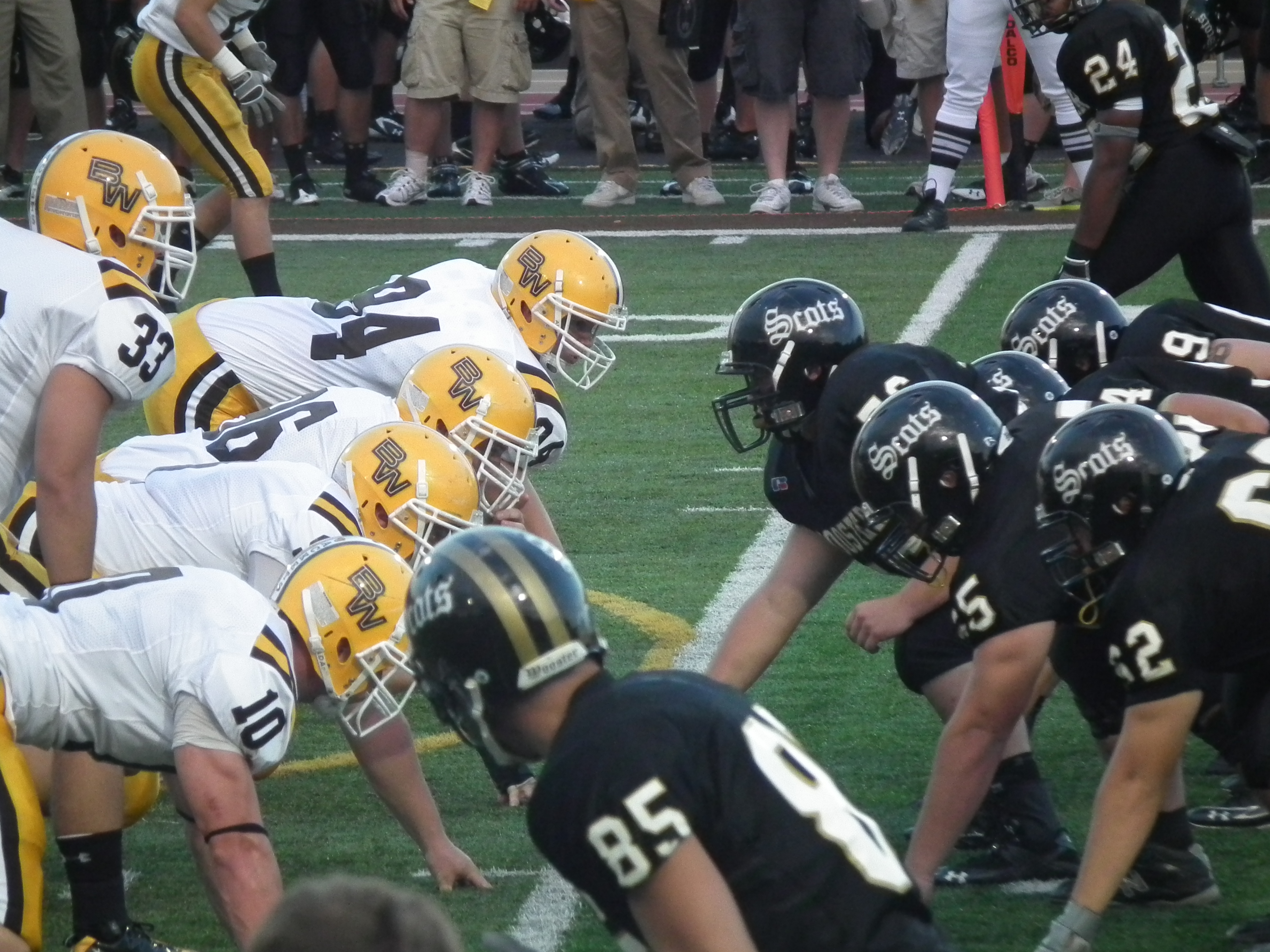
Wooster v Baldwin Wallace game in 2010

Jack Lengyel, who is known for becoming Marshall's head coach following the airplane crash that killed their head coach, coached Wooster for five seasons before accepting the Marshall job. In 2004, the team recorded a perfect 10–0 regular season and won its first outright NCAC conference championship, as well as its first NCAA D-III football tournament game. The 2004 team was led by senior All-American running back Tony Sutton, who set multiple NCAA Division III career rushing records and was a 2004 finalist for the Gagliardi Trophy, the D-III equivalent of the Heisman Trophy. From 1995 through 2008, Wooster's record was 99–43, making this the most successful era since World War II. In 2009, lights and artificial turf were added to the Scots' 4,500-seat John Papp stadium. The first-ever nighttime football game at Wooster was played on October 10, 2009, against Case Western Reserve University, with Case retaining the Baird Brothers Trophy by virtue of a 53–32 victory over the Scots.

=== Other sports ===
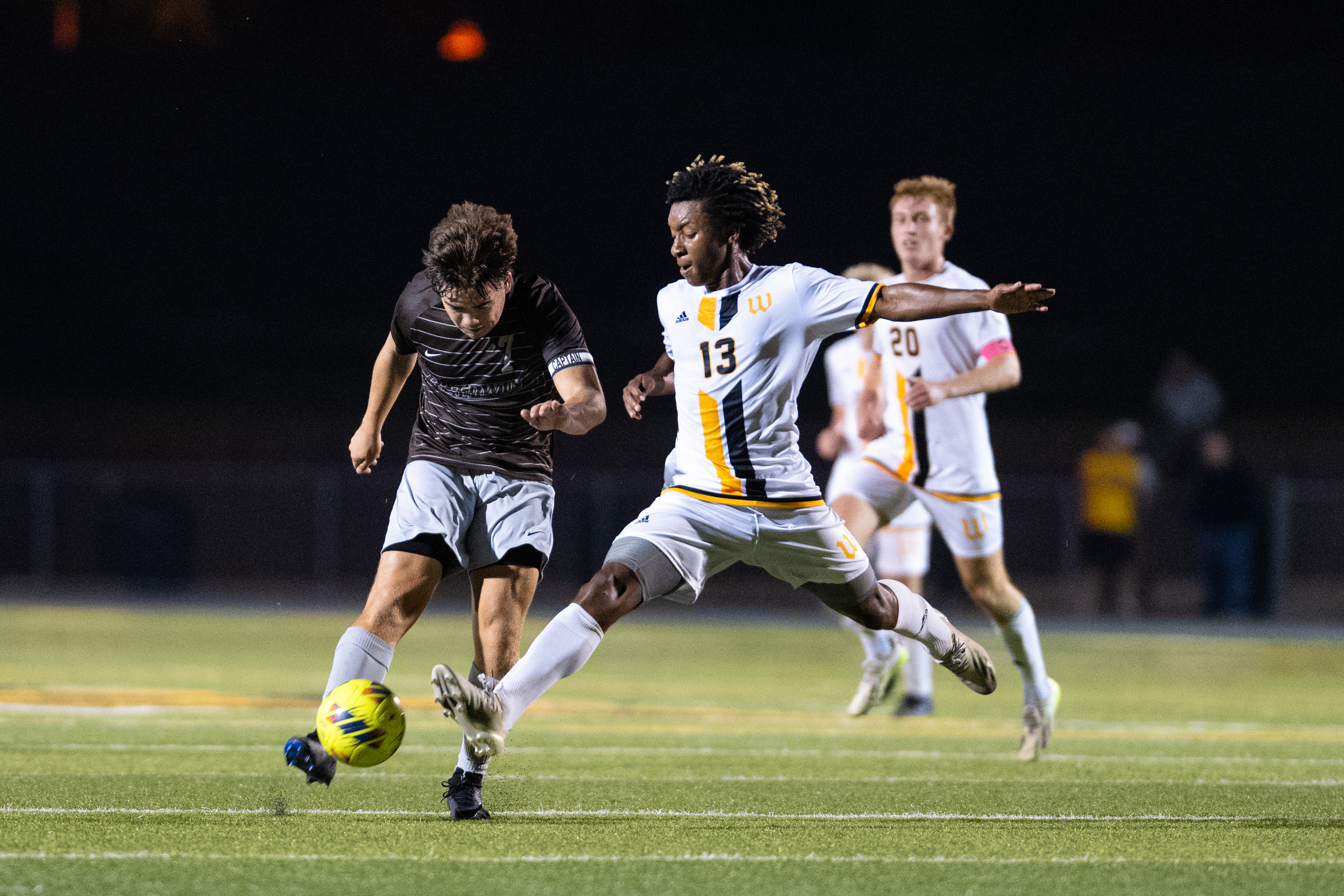
A men's soccer match between Wooster and Baldwin Wallace in 2023

In the early 2000s, the women's field hockey and women's lacrosse teams each won multiple NCAC championships, earning automatic bids to their national NCAA Division III tournaments. The only national championship won by a Wooster athletic team came in 1975, when the men's golf team won the NCAA D3 title. In addition to varsity athletics, Wooster has club teams in men's & women's ultimate, women's rugby, men's soccer, and cricket, among others.

=== Academic All-Americans ===
Since 2000, Scots have been named Academic All-Americans 32 times by College Sports Information Directors of America, in the college division, which includes NCAA Division II and Division III institutions, as well as NAIA schools, a total of over 1,000 colleges.

=== NCAA Postgraduate Scholars ===
33 Scots have won the prestigious NCAA Postgraduate Scholarship, including 18 since 2018. Over the five academic years ending in 2025, Wooster ranked 3rd across all NCAA institutions in this category, trailing only Stanford University and Emory University. Each year, 126 of these $10,000 scholarships are awarded to "student-athletes who have excelled academically and athletically, and who plan to pursue graduate school."

== Facilities ==
The Scot Center is the recreation center for students and alumni at the college. Construction was completed in January 2012 at a cost of roughly 30 million dollars. Home to the Fighting Scots, the center offers a wide assortment of fitness equipment available to both college athletes and the community. It was built to improve athletics and overall fitness at the college.

facility includes four intramural courts for basketball, tennis, and volleyball, a 200-meter running track, equipment for indoor baseball practice, and an indoor golf simulator.

The previous recreation facility for the college, Armington Physical Education Center (the PEC), was adequate. However, an increased demand for high-end facilities pressured the administration and the board of trustees to build the Scot Center. The 123,000 square-foot facility houses four intramural courts for basketball, tennis and volleyball that are put to use daily.

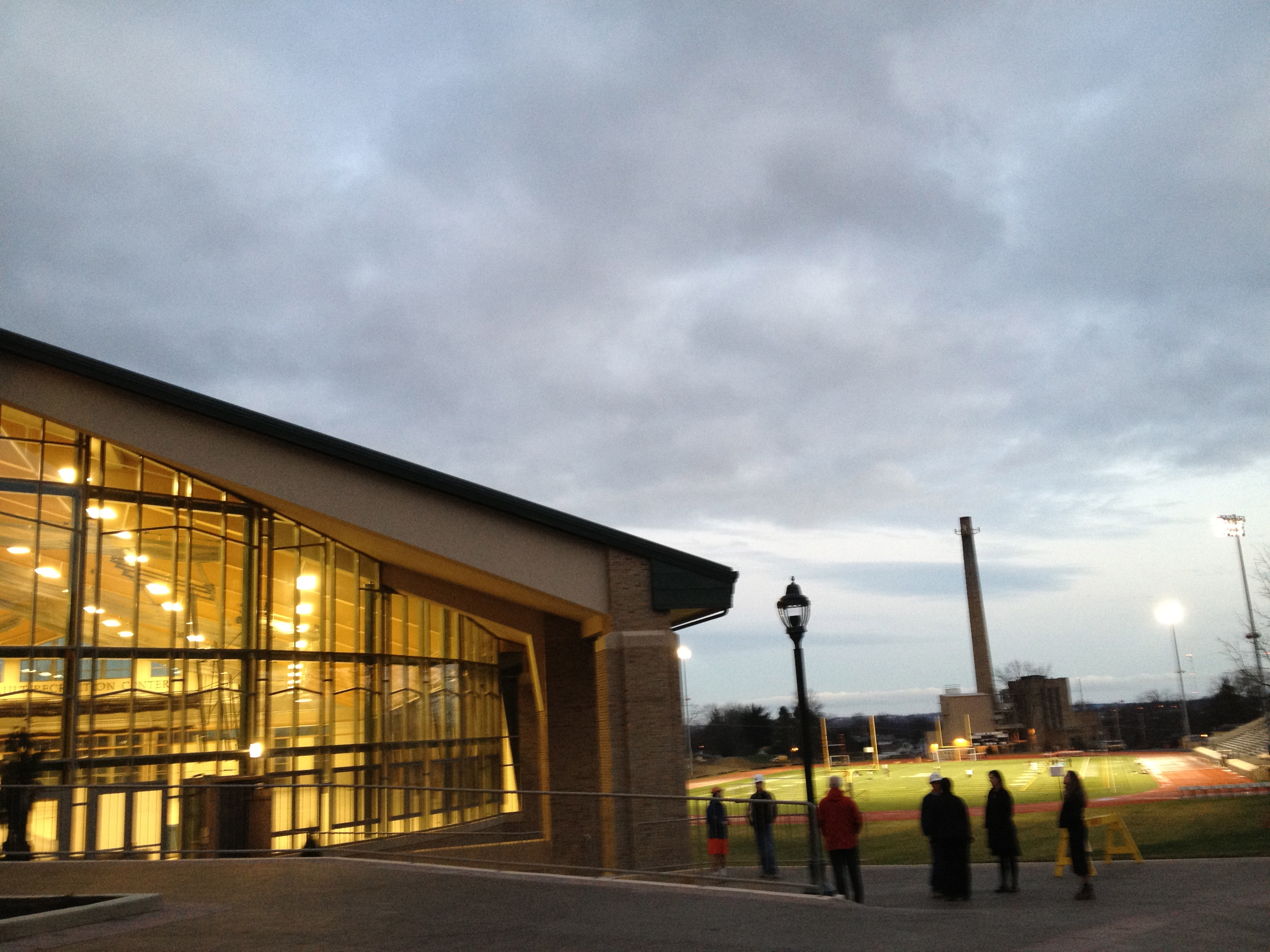
Scot Center, Wooster's main recreational facility, with Papp Stadium in the background

Venue	Sport(s)	Ref.
John P. Papp Stadium	Football; Track and field (Note: Practised at the Carl Munson Track.)	
Art Murray Field	Baseball	
Timken Gymnasium (Note: Located inside the Armington Physical Education Center.)	Basketball; Volleyball	
Carl Dale Field	Soccer	
Galpin Park	Softball	
Timken Natatorium	Swimming	
Wooster Tennis Courts	Tennis	
Scot Center (Note: For recreational purposes, not the home venue of varsity teams officially.)	(various) (Note: Include intramural courts for basketball, tennis, and volleyball; a 200 meter running track, a fitness center, batting cages for indoor baseball practice, and an indoor golf simulator.)	
L.C. Boles Course (Note: Not owned by the college but an open-to-public course.)	Golf	
