= Devils River (Michigan) =

River in Michigan, United States

Coordinates: 44°55′34″N 83°25′15″W

Devils River is a 2.4-mile-long (3.9 km) river in the U.S. state of Michigan. It is located mostly in Alpena County south of the city of Alpena.

The mouth is on Thunder Bay of Lake Huron near the small community of Ossineke in Sanborn Township. The north branch rises as the outflow of Devils Lake a few mile north-northwest of Ossineke. The south branch of the river rises in northern Alcona County near the community of Spruce in Caledonia Township and flows mostly north and east to join the north branch near Ossineke, just 2.4 miles (3.9 km) from the mouth.

The south branch runs closely along the west side of U.S. Highway 23 for about two miles (3.2 km), before the road crosses both the south and north branches near Ossineke.

An Ojibwe village was once located at the mouth of the river along with two large image stones from which the name of Ossineke (from zhingaabewasiniigigaabawaad meaning "Where the Image stones stood,") is derived.
