= North Monroeville, Ohio =

Community in Erie County, Ohio, United States

- Unincorporated community
- Location within Ohio Location within the United States
- Coordinates: 41°17′15″N 82°43′33″W
- Country: United States
- State: Ohio
- County: Erie
- Elevation: 722 ft (220 m)
- Time zone: Eastern (UTC)
- ZIP code: 44847
- Area code: 419
- GNIS feature ID: 1065850

North Monroeville is an unincorporated community in Erie County, Ohio, United States. Its name derives from Monroeville, an incorporated village south of the community and in Huron County. There is a cemetery in North Monroeville called the North Monroeville Cemetery that has existed since the early 19th century.
