= Ossineke, Michigan =

- Census-designated place (CDP) & unincorporated community
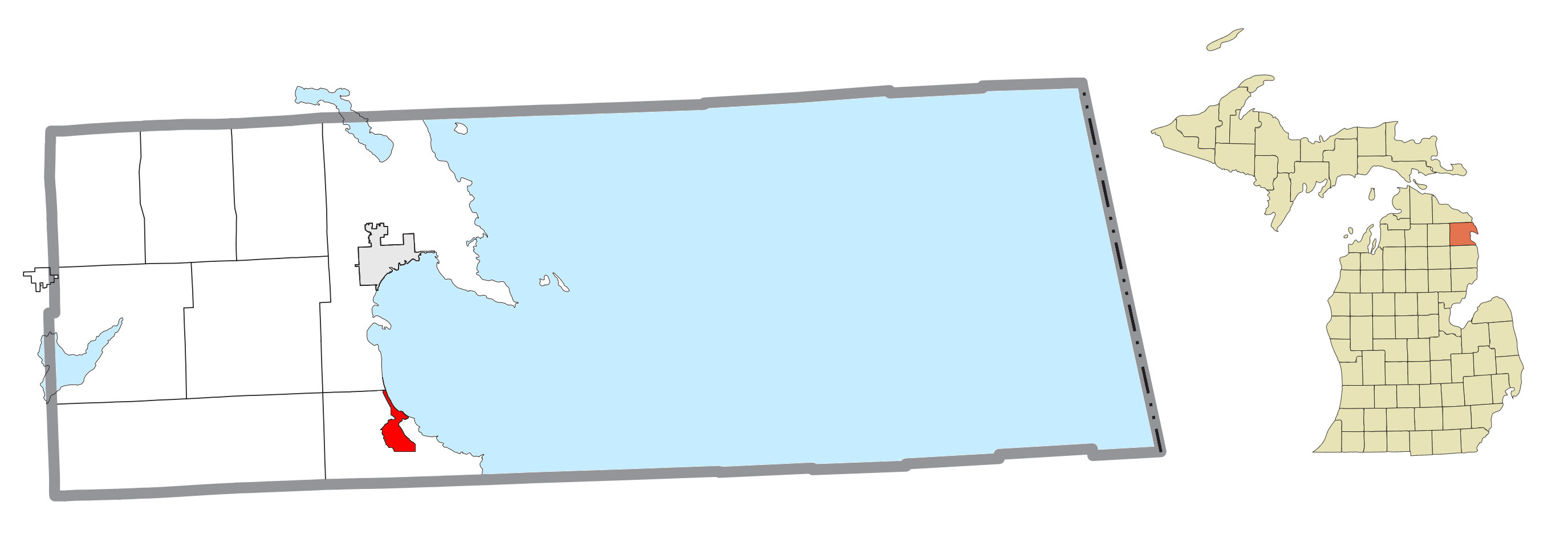
- Location within Alpena County

- Location within the state of Michigan Ossineke (the United States)
- Coordinates: 44°54′26″N 83°25′44″W
- Country: United States
- State: Michigan
- County: Alpena County
- Township: Sanborn

Area
  - Total: 3.67 sq mi (9.50 km^{2})
  - Land: 3.66 sq mi (9.47 km^{2})
  - Water: 0.012 sq mi (0.03 km^{2})

Population (2020)
  - Total: 932
  - Density: 254.9/sq mi (98.41/km^{2})
- Time zone: UTC-5 (Eastern (EST))
  - Summer (DST): UTC-4 (EDT)
- ZIP code(s): 49766
- Area code: 989
- FIPS code: 26-61500
- GNIS feature ID: 2393175

Ossineke is an unincorporated community and census-designated place in Alpena County in the U.S. state of Michigan. The population was 932 at the 2020 census. The community is located within Sanborn Township, several miles south of Alpena on U.S. Highway 23.

The name is derived from the Anishinaabe word (either the Ojibwa or the Ottawa) zhingaabewasiniigigaabawaad, meaning "Where the image stones stood", though the modern Anishinaabe name for the place is asiniike, meaning "to quarry".

== Geography ==
According to the United States Census Bureau, the CDP has a total area of 3.67 square miles (9.51 km^{2}), of which 3.66 square miles (9.48 km^{2}) is land and 0.01 square miles (0.03 km^{2}) (0.27%) is water. Ossineke is part of Northern Michigan.

== History ==
The image stones were thought to embody the spirit of Chief Shinggabaw, who promised to return there after death. After they were stolen by a rival tribe, the Great Spirit put them back and destroyed the raiding party. Later, a white fisherman stole them, using them to anchor fishing nets, and they are now somewhere in Lake Huron.

In 1973, the community was the site of the Great Michigan Pizza Funeral. The factory was located at 6050 Gull Road, Osineke, Michigan.

== Demographics ==
Historical population
Census	Pop.	Note	%±
2020	932		—
U.S. Decennial Census

As of the census of 2000, there were 1,059 people, 416 households, and 306 families residing in the CDP. The population density was 287.8 inhabitants per square mile (111.1/km^{2}). There were 516 housing units at an average density of 140.2 per square mile (54.1/km^{2}). The racial makeup of the CDP was 98.49% White, 0.28% Black or African American, 0.19% Native American, 0.19% Asian, 0.19% from other races, and 0.66% from two or more races. Hispanic or Latino of any race were 0.19% of the population.

There were 416 households, out of which 33.9% had children under the age of 18 living with them, 58.7% were married couples living together, 11.1% had a female householder with no husband present, and 26.4% were non-families. 22.4% of all households were made up of individuals, and 10.6% had someone living alone who was 65 years of age or older. The average household size was 2.52 and the average family size was 2.90.

In the CDP, the population was spread out, with 25.0% under the age of 18, 6.7% from 18 to 24, 27.5% from 25 to 44, 25.2% from 45 to 64, and 15.6% who were 65 years of age or older. The median age was 40 years. For every 100 females, there were 98.7 males. For every 100 females age 18 and over, there were 91.8 males.

The median income for a household in the CDP was $33,667, and the median income for a family was $40,625. Males had a median income of $36,250 versus $19,464 for females. The per capita income for the CDP was $16,519. About 12.1% of families and 15.0% of the population were below the poverty line, including 22.1% of those under age 18 and 15.0% of those age 65 or over.

== Transportation ==
=== Bus ===
Indian Trails provides daily intercity bus service between St. Ignace and Bay City, Michigan.

== Paul Bunyan and Babe the Blue Ox ==
A large statue of Paul Bunyan with a neutered Babe the Blue Ox is on site in downtown Ossineke, on US-23. This was accomplished after a "mega-move" from its original site in Spruce, Alcona County, Michigan.

== See also ==
- Great Michigan Pizza Funeral
