= Manitou Beach–Devils Lake, Michigan =

- Census-designated place (CDP) & unincorporated community
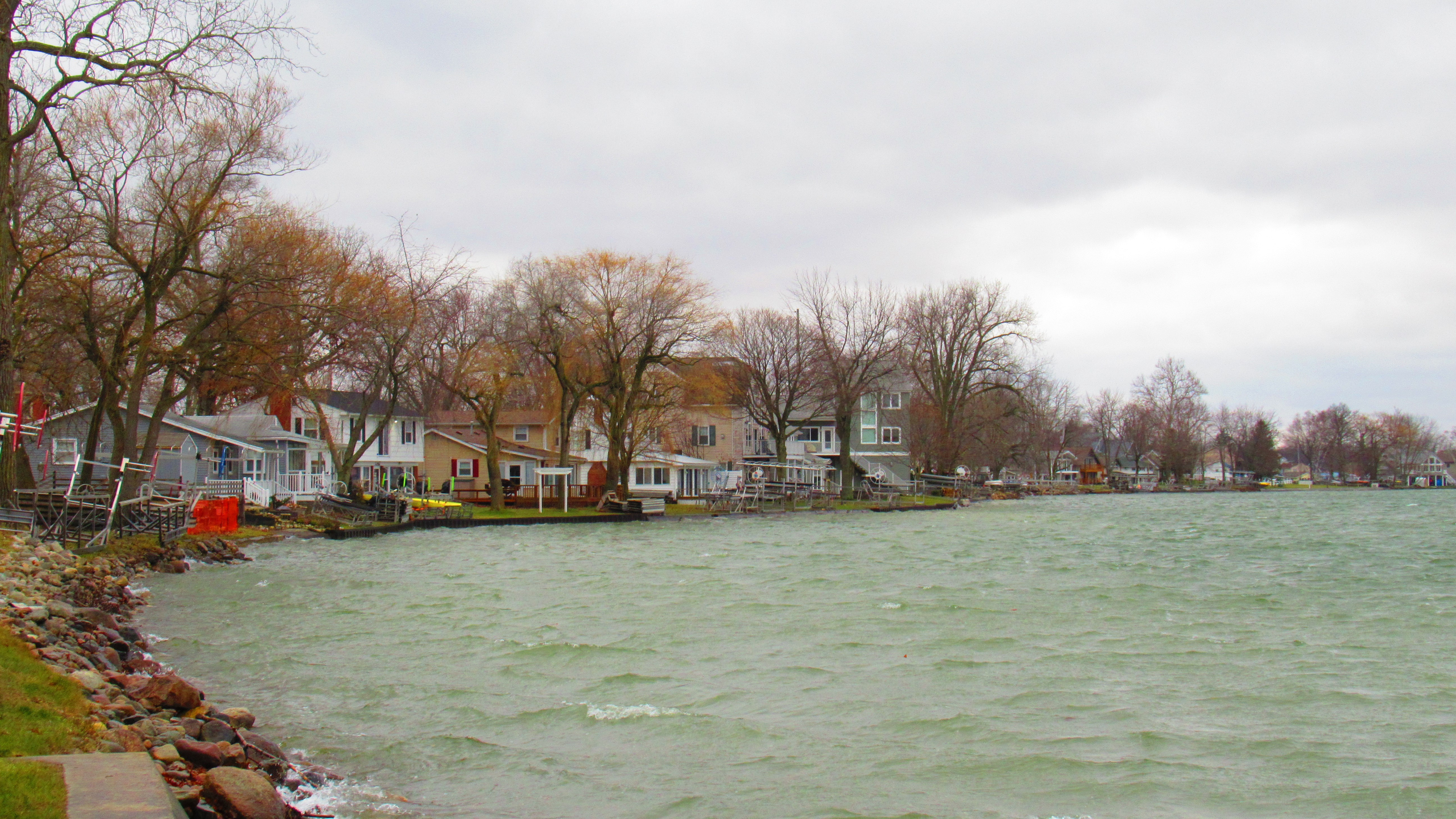
- Round Lake Highway along Devils Lake

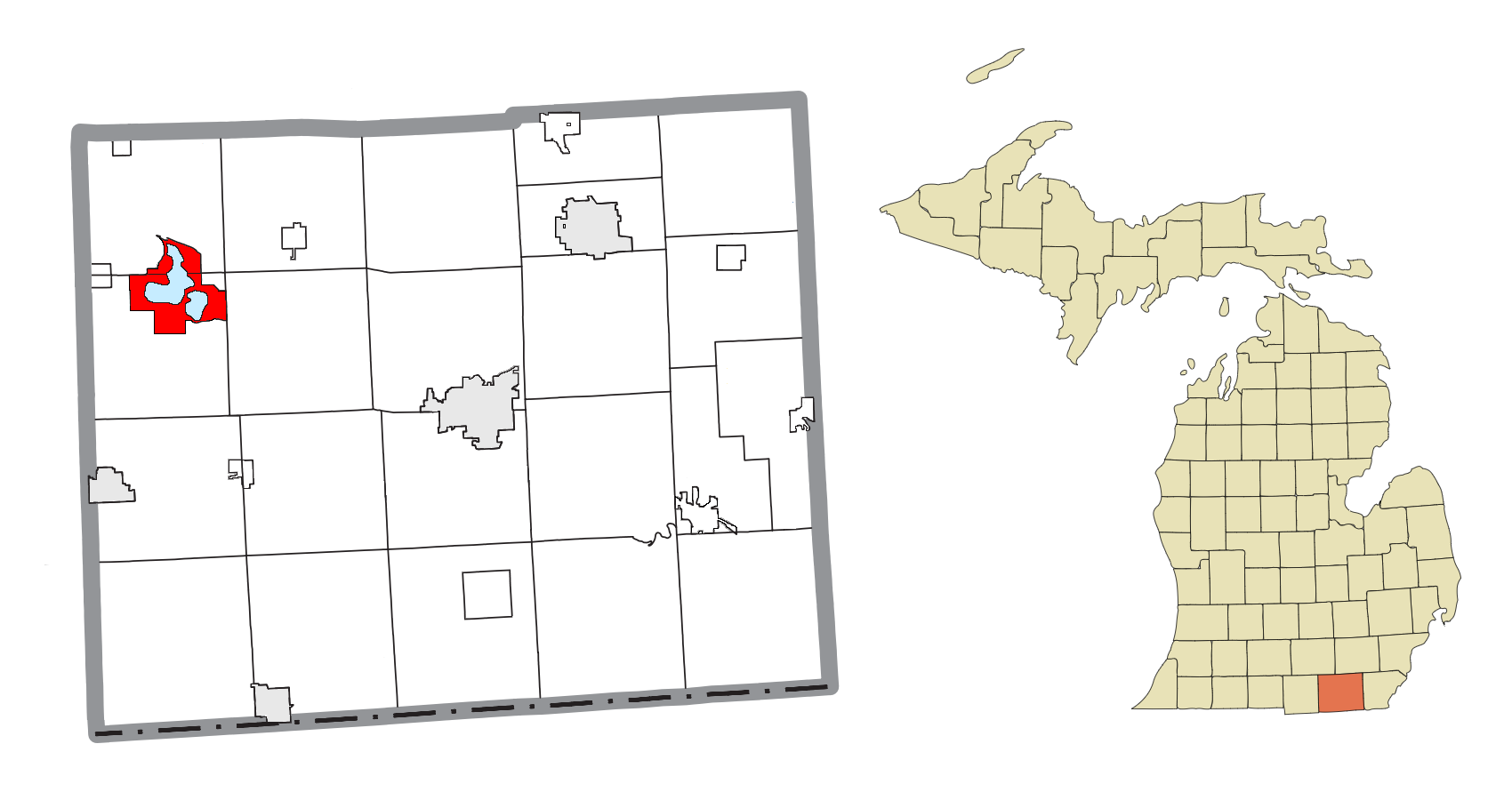
- Location within Lenawee County

- Location within the state of Michigan Location within the United States
- Coordinates: 41°58′32″N 84°17′10″W
- Country: United States
- State: Michigan
- County: Lenawee
- Townships: Rollin and Woodstock
- Settled: 1833

Area
  - Total: 8.94 sq mi (23.15 km^{2})
  - Land: 6.08 sq mi (15.75 km^{2})
  - Water: 2.86 sq mi (7.41 km^{2})
- Elevation: 1,043 ft (318 m)

Population (2020)
  - Total: 2,032
  - Density: 334.21/sq mi (129.04/km^{2})
- Time zone: UTC-5 (Eastern (EST))
  - Summer (DST): UTC-4 (EDT)
- ZIP code(s): 49253 (Manitou Beach); 49220 (Addison)
- Area code: 517
- FIPS code: 26-50830
- GNIS feature ID: 2393118

Manitou Beach–Devils Lake is a census-designated place (CDP) in Lenawee County in the U.S. state of Michigan. The population of the CDP was 2,032 at the 2020 census. It is located within Rollin Township to the south and Woodstock Township to the north.

The census-designated place consists of the unincorporated communities of Devils Lake, Geneva, and Manitou Beach and includes the larger lakes of Devils Lake and Round Lake.

== Communities ==
- Devils Lake is at the northern end of Devils Lake on U.S. Route 223 at 42°00′28″N 84°17′33″W.
- Geneva is at the south end of the smaller Round Lake to the southeast, at 41°57′29″N 84°16′40″W.
- Manitou Beach is at the southwest end of Devils Lake at 41°58′11″N 84°18′30″W, approximately 2.5 mi (4.0 km) southwest of Devils Lake and about 2 mi (3.2 km) east-southeast of Addison. Manitou Beach contains its own post office that uses the 49523 ZIP Code that serves the majority of the CDP and parts of the surrounding area.

== History ==
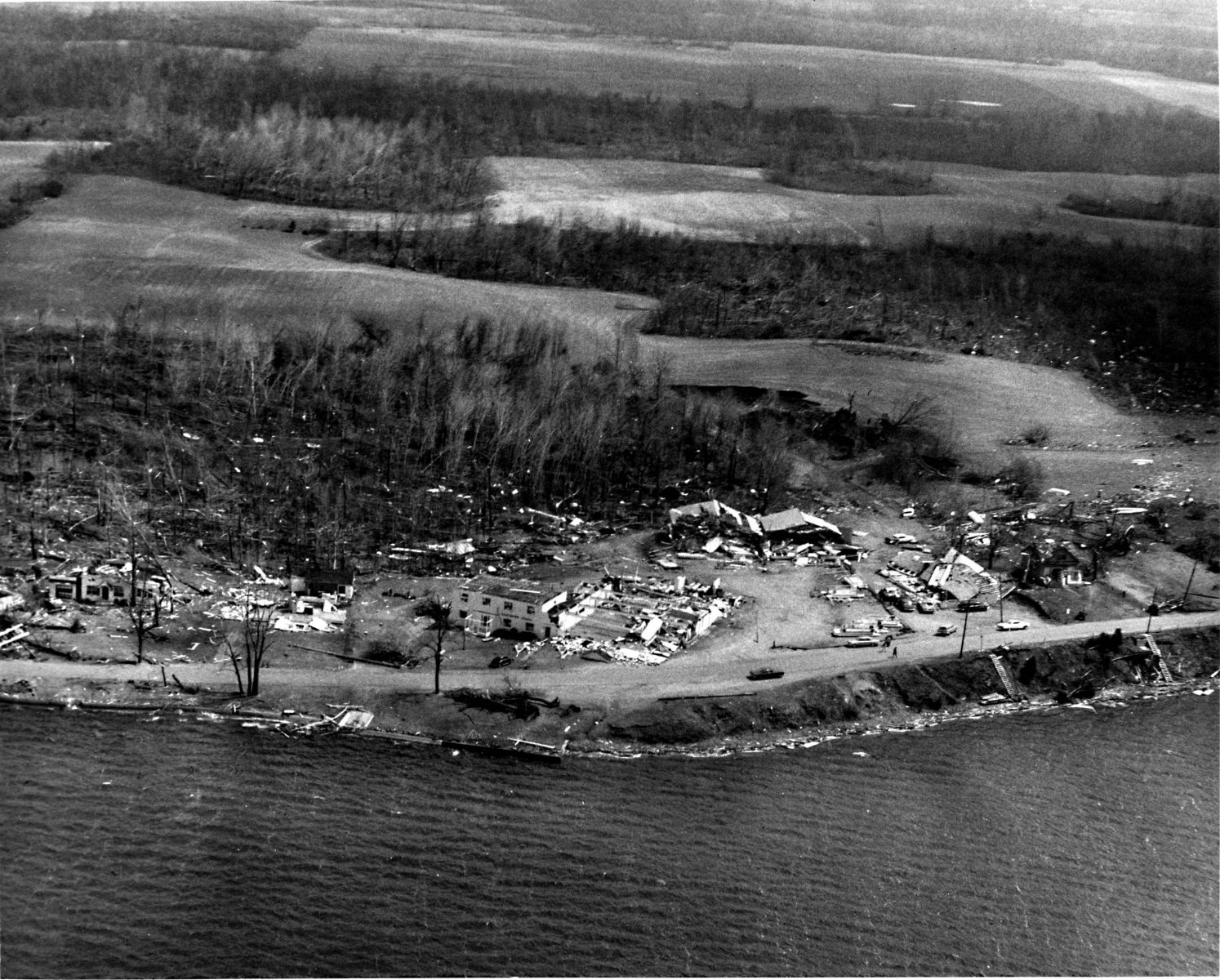
Extensive damage to the area during the 1965 Palm Sunday tornado outbreak

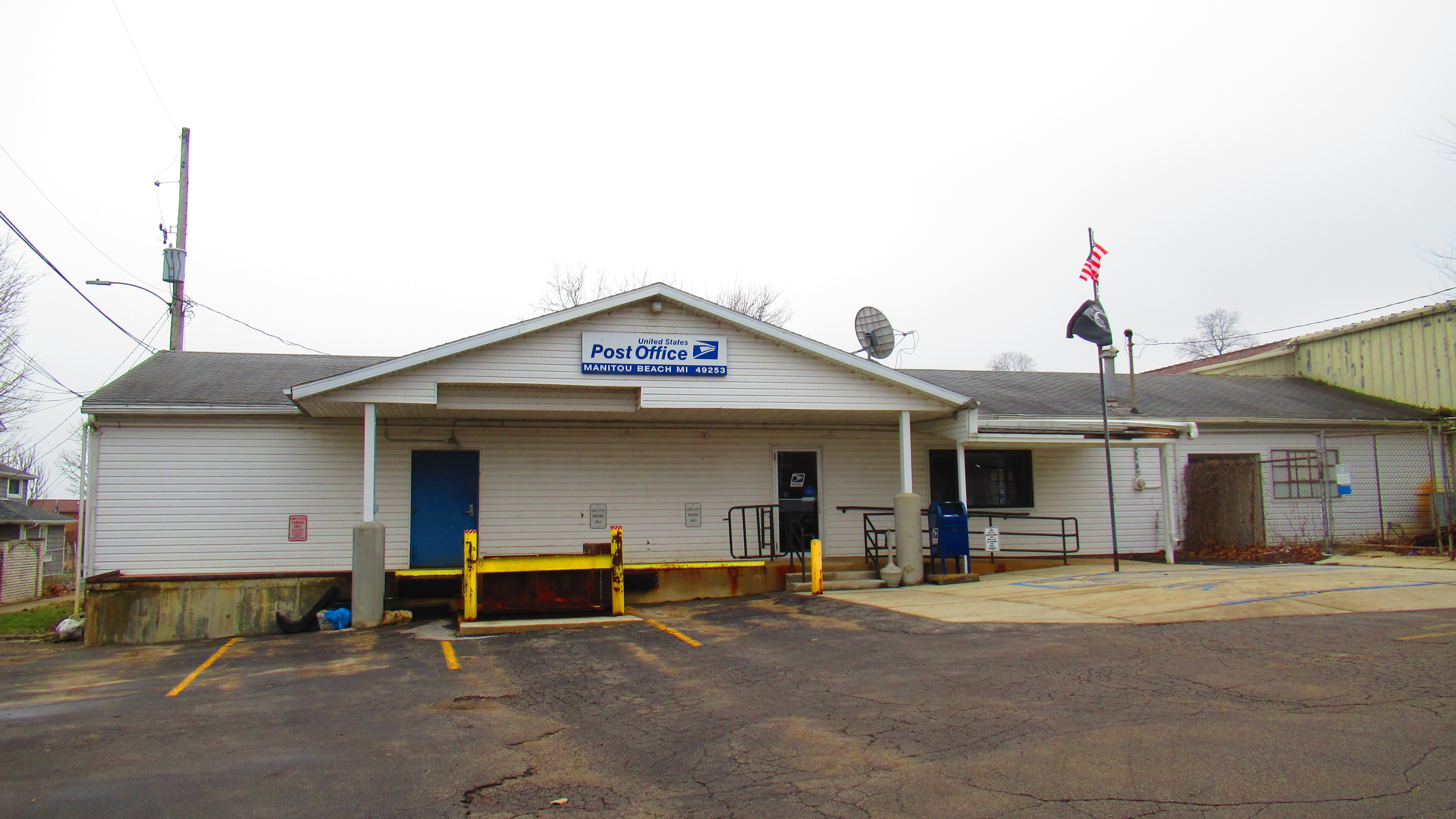
U.S. Post Office in Manitou Beach

Devil's Lake was a Potawatami village until about 1830. Most of the people were forced west of the Mississippi River after passage of the Indian Removal Act that year under President Andrew Jackson.

Manitou Beach was first noted by Euro-American settlers in the early 1830s. By the turn of the 20th century, it became a favored resort in southeast Michigan. It quickly outgrew the comparably sized community of Devils Lake at the north end of the lake. Steam launches ferried tourists from the depot to the hotels and attractions, which included bath houses, a dance pavilion, pleasure craft rental facilities, a water slide, picnic areas and eating establishments. The name 'Manitou Beach' is derived from the Potawatomi name of Devils Lake, "Michemanetue'", meaning, "Lake of God (Michi Mantitou is a variation of the Ojibwe word for the Creator)

The Manitou Beach post office was established on March 20, 1889, with Columbus F. Becker as the first postmaster. The office was discontinued on December 31, 1892, and reestablished on January 17, 1893. Manitou Beach was a station on the Cincinnati, Jackson and Mackinaw Railroad (later part of the Cincinnati Northern Railway).

Devil's Lake was said to have been named by Potawatomi leader Meteau (or Mitteau) after his daughter drowned in the lake and her body was never recovered. As she had been an able swimmer, Meteau believed her to have been taken by evil spirits.

The first European-American, or white, settlers arrived here in 1833. The Devils Lake post office was established on October 19, 1885, with John B. Allen as the first postmaster. The office was discontinued on October 31, 1936. The Detroit, Toledo and Milwaukee Railroad had a stop at Devil's Lake.

In the late 20th century, the Manitou Beach region was devastated by two F4 tornadoes during the April 11, 1965 Palm Sunday Tornado Outbreak. Most of what was destroyed was rebuilt, including the dance hall and two churches. Over the course of the past five decades, the resort has had few reminders of the tornado.

The Devils Lake Drive-In-Church, a drive-in movie theater, closed its doors after 58 seasons due to the death of its operator. The Manitou Beach Inn, a long-time staple of the business community, was destroyed by fire January 3, 2010. When the inn was rebuilt, it helped start revitalization of the historic business district along Walnut Street.

== Geography ==
According to the U.S. Census Bureau, the CDP has a total area of 8.94 square miles (23.15 km^{2}), of which 6.08 square miles (15.75 km^{2}) is land and 2.86 square miles (7.41 km^{2}) (31.99%) is water.

=== Major highways ===
- US 223 forms the northern boundary of the census-designated place.

== Demographics ==
Historical population
Census	Pop.	Note	%±
1990	2,061		—
2000	2,080		0.9%
2010	2,019		−2.9%
2020	2,032		0.6%
U.S. Decennial Census

As of the census of 2000, there were 2,080 people, 898 households, and 600 families residing in the CDP. The population density was 297.3 inhabitants per square mile (114.8/km^{2}). There were 1,732 housing units at an average density of 247.5 per square mile (95.6/km^{2}). The racial makeup of the CDP was 98.08% White, 0.19% African American, 0.14% Native American, 0.14% Asian, 0.19% from other races, and 1.25% from two or more races. Hispanic or Latino residents of any race were 1.25% of the population.

There were 898 households, out of which 25.1% had children under the age of 18 living with them, 56.7% were married couples living together, 6.1% had a female householder with no husband present, and 33.1% were non-families. 28.2% of all households were made up of individuals, and 10.4% had someone living alone who was 65 years of age or older. The average household size was 2.32 and the average family size was 2.81.

In the CDP, 22.0% of the population was under the age of 18, 5.9% was from 18 to 24, 27.5% from 25 to 44, 30.5% from 45 to 64, and 14.1% was 65 years of age or older. The median age was 42 years. For every 100 females, there were 102.1 males. For every 100 females age 18 and over, there were 99.0 males.

The median income for a household in the CDP was $37,938, and the median income for a family was $63,810. Males had a median income of $39,375 versus $29,167 for females. The per capita income for the CDP was $24,561. About 4.3% of families and 6.8% of the population were below the poverty line, including 2.6% of those under age 18 and 12.9% of those age 65 or over.
