= Rollin Township, Michigan =

- Civil township
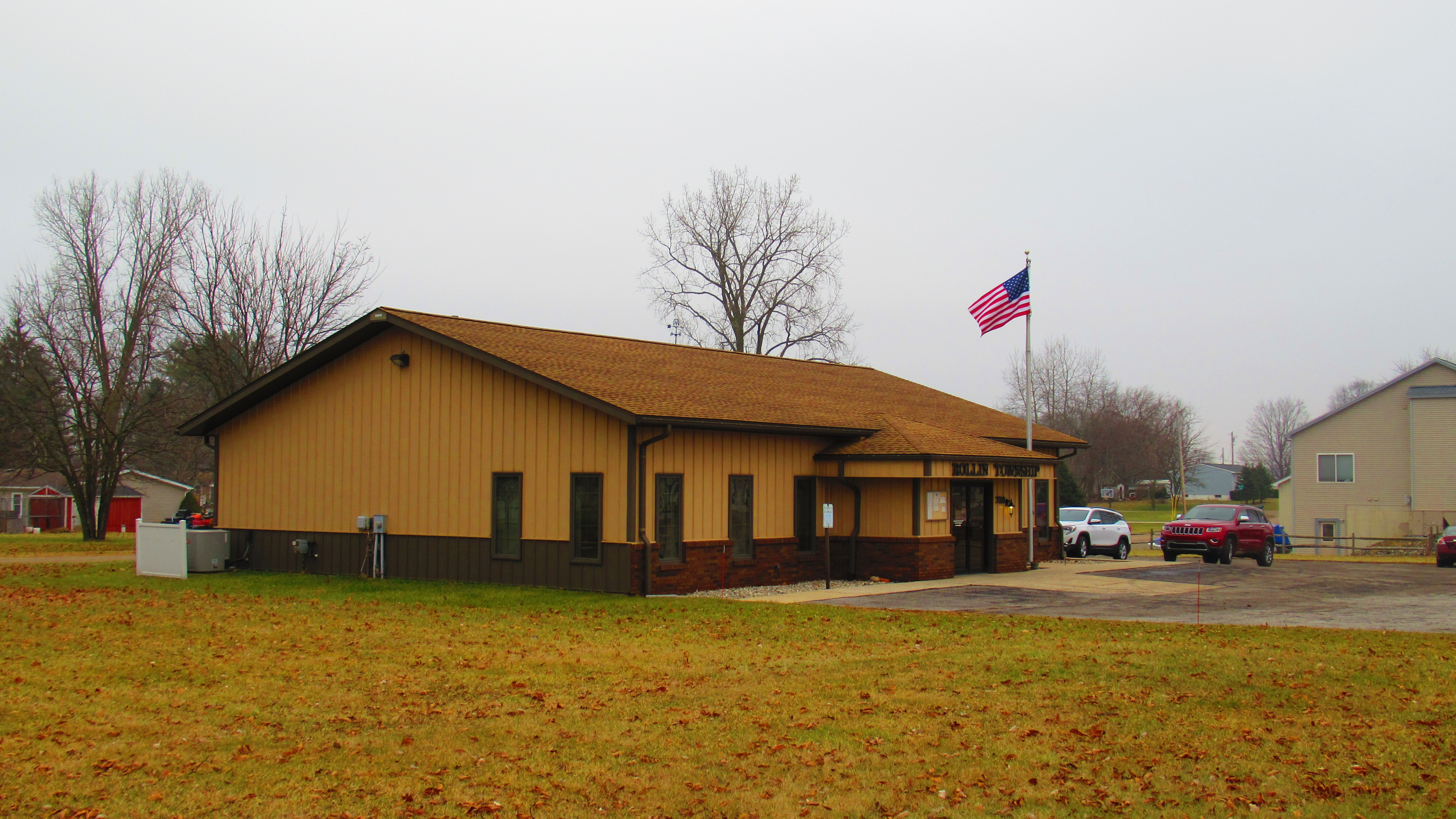
- Rollin Township Hall in Manitou Beach

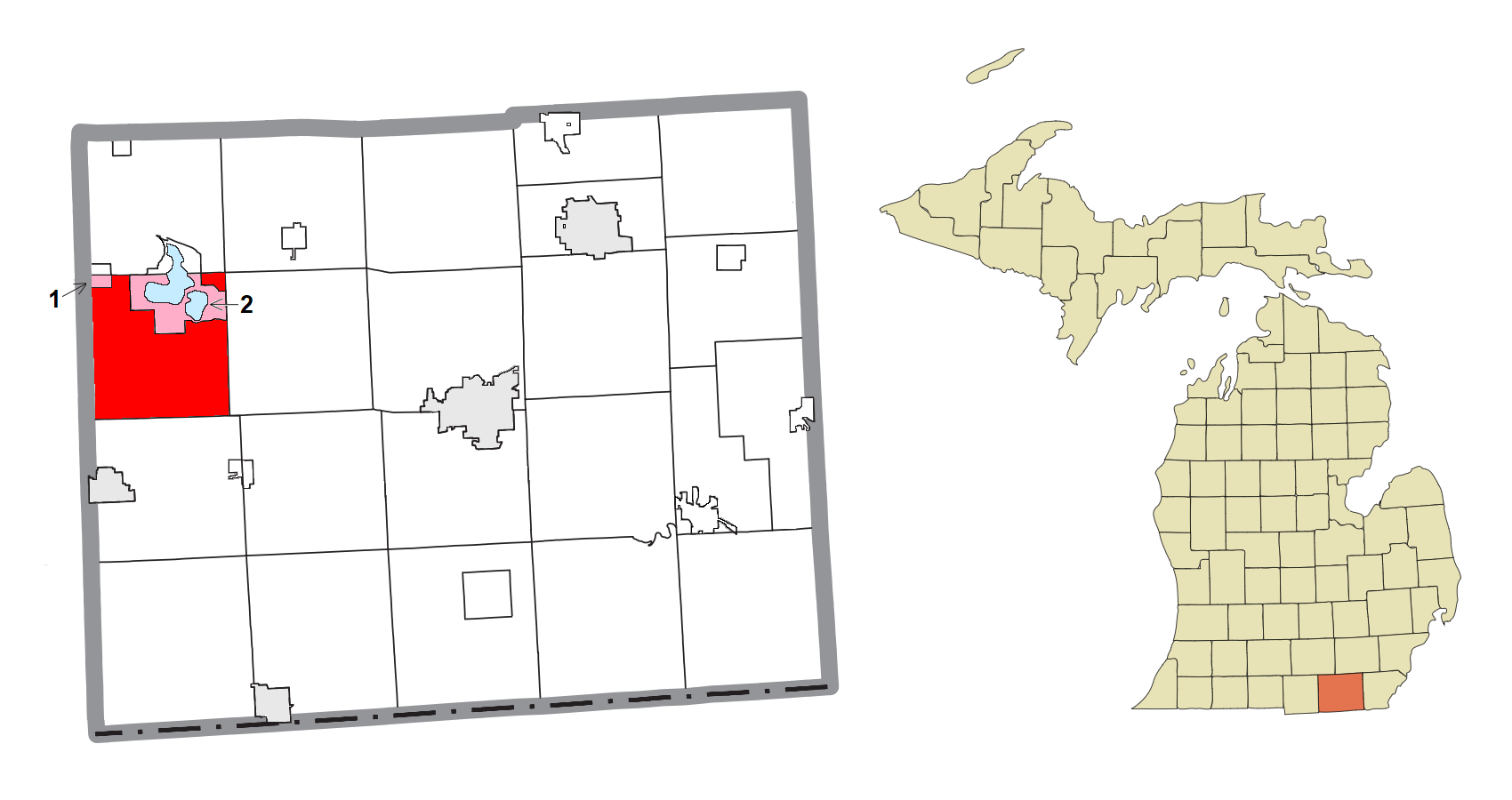
- Location within Lenawee County and administered portions of the village of Addison (1) and CDP of Manitou Beach–Devils Lake (2)

- Location within the state of Michigan Rollin Township (the United States)
- Coordinates: 41°57′00″N 84°19′00″W
- Country: United States
- State: Michigan
- County: Lenawee
- Established: 1835

Government
  - Supervisor: Michael J. Clark
  - Clerk: Amy Emerson

Area
  - Total: 36.2 sq mi (93.7 km^{2})
  - Land: 33.9 sq mi (87.8 km^{2})
  - Water: 2.3 sq mi (5.9 km^{2})
- Elevation: 1,043 ft (318 m)

Population (2020)
  - Total: 3,035
  - Density: 89.5/sq mi (34.6/km^{2})
- Time zone: UTC-5 (Eastern (EST))
  - Summer (DST): UTC-4 (EDT)
- ZIP code(s): 49220 (Addison); 49235 (Clayton); 49247 (Hudson); 49253 (Manitou Beach)
- Area code: 517
- FIPS code: 26-69340
- GNIS feature ID: 1626998
- Website: www.rollintownship.org

Rollin Township is a civil township of Lenawee County in the U.S. state of Michigan. The population was 3,035 at the 2020 census.

== Geography ==
According to the United States Census Bureau, the township has a total area of 36.2 square miles (94 km^{2}), of which 33.9 square miles (88 km^{2}) is land and 2.3 square miles (6.0 km^{2}) (6.33%) is water.

== Communities ==
- Geneva was the name of a post office here from 1854 until 1908.
- Manitou Beach–Devils Lake is a census-designated place primarily located within the township, with a portion extending into Woodstock Township. It consists of the unincorporated communities of Devils Lake, Geneva, and Manitou Beach and includes the larger lakes of Devils Lake and Round Lake. It is bordered to the north by U.S. Route 223.

== Demographics ==
As of the census of 2000, there were 3,176 people, 1,296 households, and 900 families residing in the township. The population density was 93.7 inhabitants per square mile (36.2/km^{2}). There were 1,970 housing units at an average density of 58.1 per square mile (22.4/km^{2}). The racial makeup of the township was 98.46% White, 0.13% African American, 0.13% Native American, 0.38% Asian, 0.13% from other races, and 0.79% from two or more races. Hispanic or Latino of any race were 1.29% of the population.

There were 1,296 households, out of which 29.9% had children under the age of 18 living with them, 57.9% were married couples living together, 7.8% had a female householder with no husband present, and 30.5% were non-families. 26.2% of all households were made up of individuals, and 8.4% had someone living alone who was 65 years of age or older. The average household size was 2.45 and the average family size was 2.93.

In the township the population was spread out, with 25.0% under the age of 18, 6.3% from 18 to 24, 26.9% from 25 to 44, 28.4% from 45 to 64, and 13.4% who were 65 years of age or older. The median age was 40 years. For every 100 females, there were 104.0 males. For every 100 females age 18 and over, there were 99.2 males.

The median income for a household in the township was $39,638, and the median income for a family was $54,667. Males had a median income of $36,629 versus $24,250 for females. The per capita income for the township was $21,103. About 4.1% of families and 6.5% of the population were below the poverty line, including 4.6% of those under age 18 and 13.3% of those age 65 or over.
