= Woodstock Township, Michigan =

- Civil township
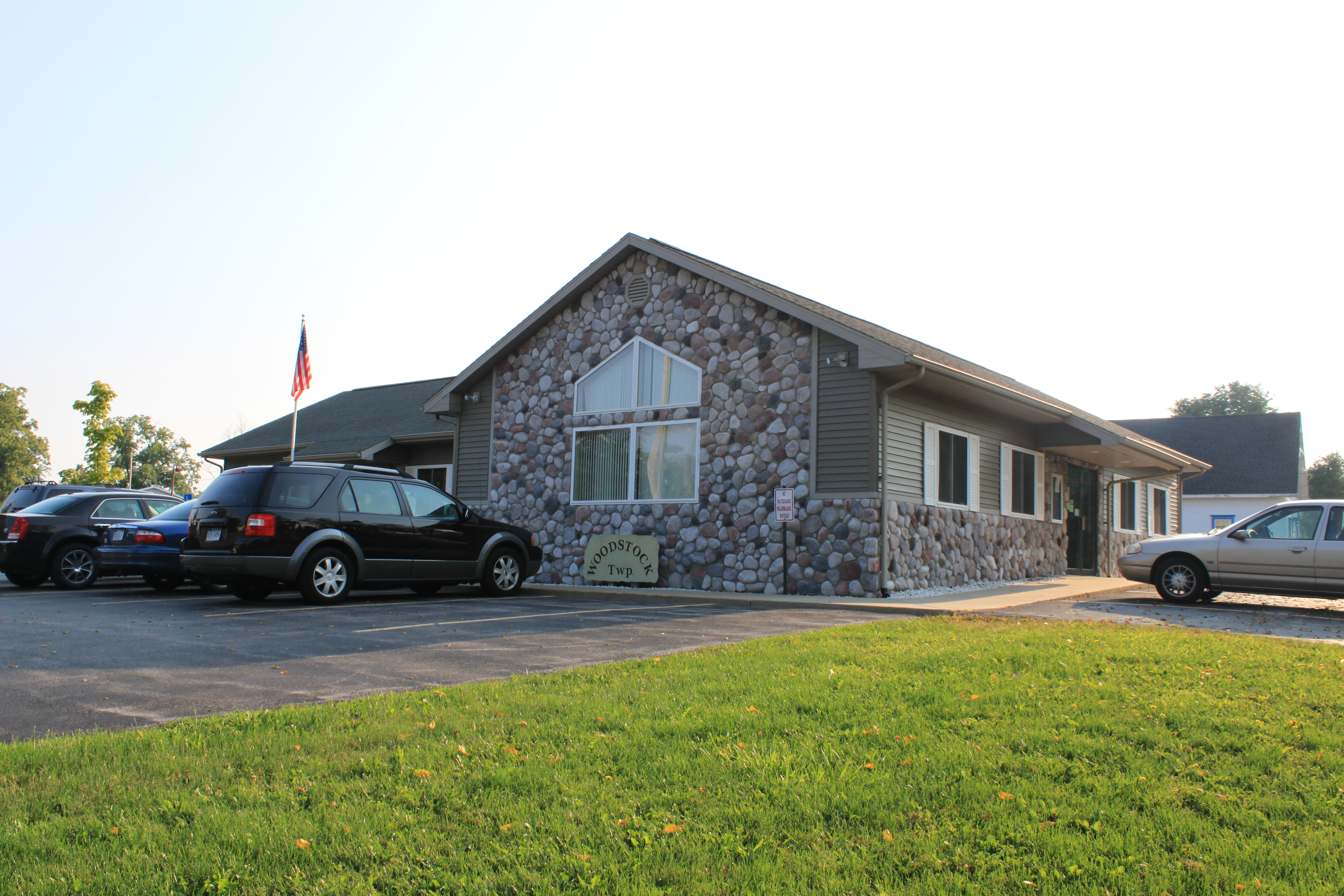
- Woodstock Township Hall

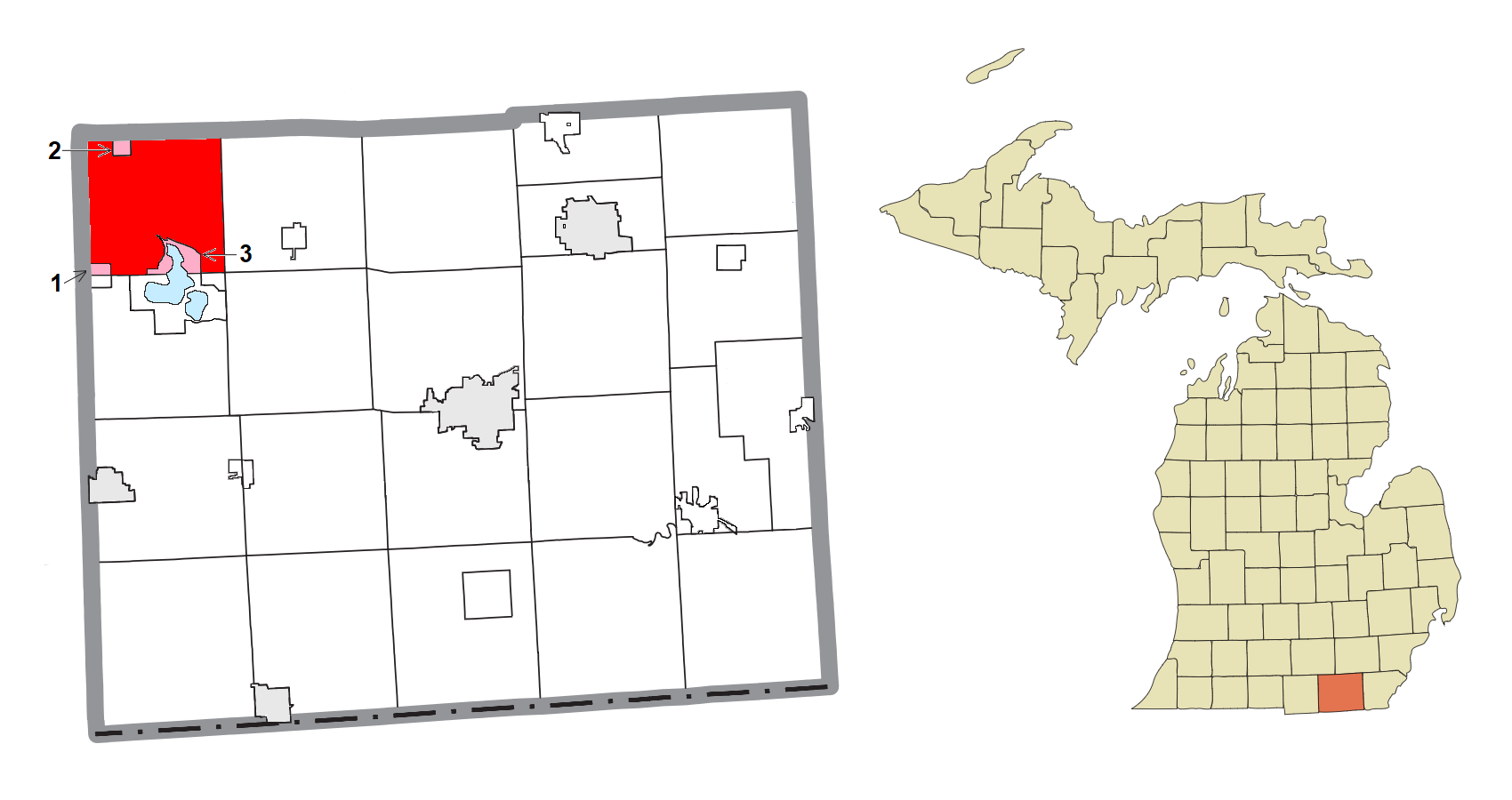
- Location within Lenawee County and the administered portions of the villages of Addison (1), Cement City (2), and the CDP of Manitou Beach–Devils Lake (3)

- Location within the state of Michigan Woodstock Township (the United States)
- Coordinates: 42°01′40″N 84°18′03″W
- Country: United States
- State: Michigan
- County: Lenawee

Government
  - Supervisor: James Anderson
  - Clerk: Ashley Wilson

Area
  - Total: 35.7 sq mi (92.5 km^{2})
  - Land: 33.9 sq mi (87.8 km^{2})
  - Water: 1.8 sq mi (4.7 km^{2})
- Elevation: 1,066 ft (325 m)

Population (2020)
  - Total: 3,608
  - Density: 106/sq mi (41.1/km^{2})
- Time zone: UTC-5 (Eastern (EST))
  - Summer (DST): UTC-4 (EDT)
- ZIP code(s): 49220 (Addison); 49230 (Brooklyn); 49233 (Cement City); 49253 (Manitou Beach)
- Area code: 517
- FIPS code: 26-88640
- GNIS feature ID: 1627290
- Website: www.woodstocktownship.com

Woodstock Township is a civil township of Lenawee County, Michigan, United States. As of the 2020 census, the township population was 3,608.

== Communities ==
- Most of the village of Cement City is within the township. A small northern portion extends into Columbia in Jackson County.
- About half of the village of Addison is within the township. The southern half extends into Rollin Township.
- A portion of the Manitou Beach–Devils Lake CDP extends into Woodstock Township. The majority of the CDP is to the south in Rollin Township.

== Geography ==
According to the United States Census Bureau, the township has a total area of 35.7 square miles (92 km^{2}), of which 33.9 square miles (88 km^{2}) is land and 1.8 square miles (4.7 km^{2}) (5.12%) is water.

== Demographics ==
As of the census of 2000, there were 3,468 people, 1,344 households, and 1,006 families residing in the township. The population density was 102.3 inhabitants per square mile (39.5/km^{2}). There were 1,753 housing units at an average density of 51.7 per square mile (20.0/km^{2}). The racial makeup of the township was 97.87% White, 0.17% African American, 0.23% Native American, 0.17% Asian, 0.40% from other races, and 1.15% from two or more races. Hispanic or Latino of any race were 1.27% of the population.

There were 1,344 households, out of which 30.1% had children under the age of 18 living with them, 63.3% were married couples living together, 7.6% had a female householder with no husband present, and 25.1% were non-families. 21.3% of all households were made up of individuals, and 8.3% had someone living alone who was 65 years of age or older. The average household size was 2.58 and the average family size was 2.98.

In the township the population was spread out, with 25.1% under the age of 18, 6.3% from 18 to 24, 27.8% from 25 to 44, 28.1% from 45 to 64, and 12.8% who were 65 years of age or older. The median age was 40 years. For every 100 females, there were 102.3 males. For every 100 females age 18 and over, there were 101.5 males.

The median income for a household in the township was $42,882, and the median income for a family was $52,041. Males had a median income of $41,344 versus $26,512 for females. The per capita income for the township was $20,551. About 4.0% of families and 6.6% of the population were below the poverty line, including 8.4% of those under age 18 and 3.6% of those age 65 or over.
