= Addison, Michigan =

- Village
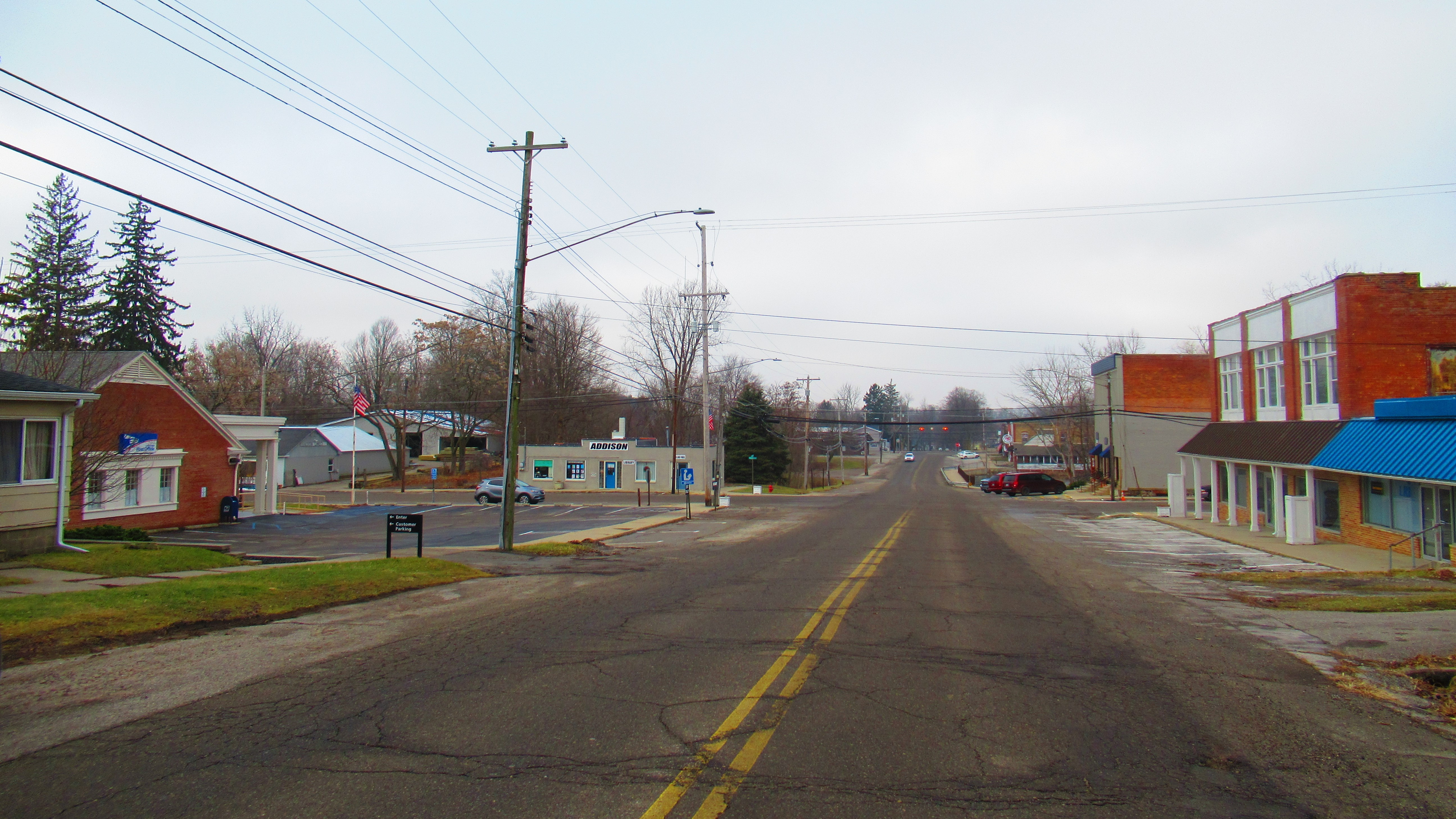
- Looking west along Main Street toward US 127

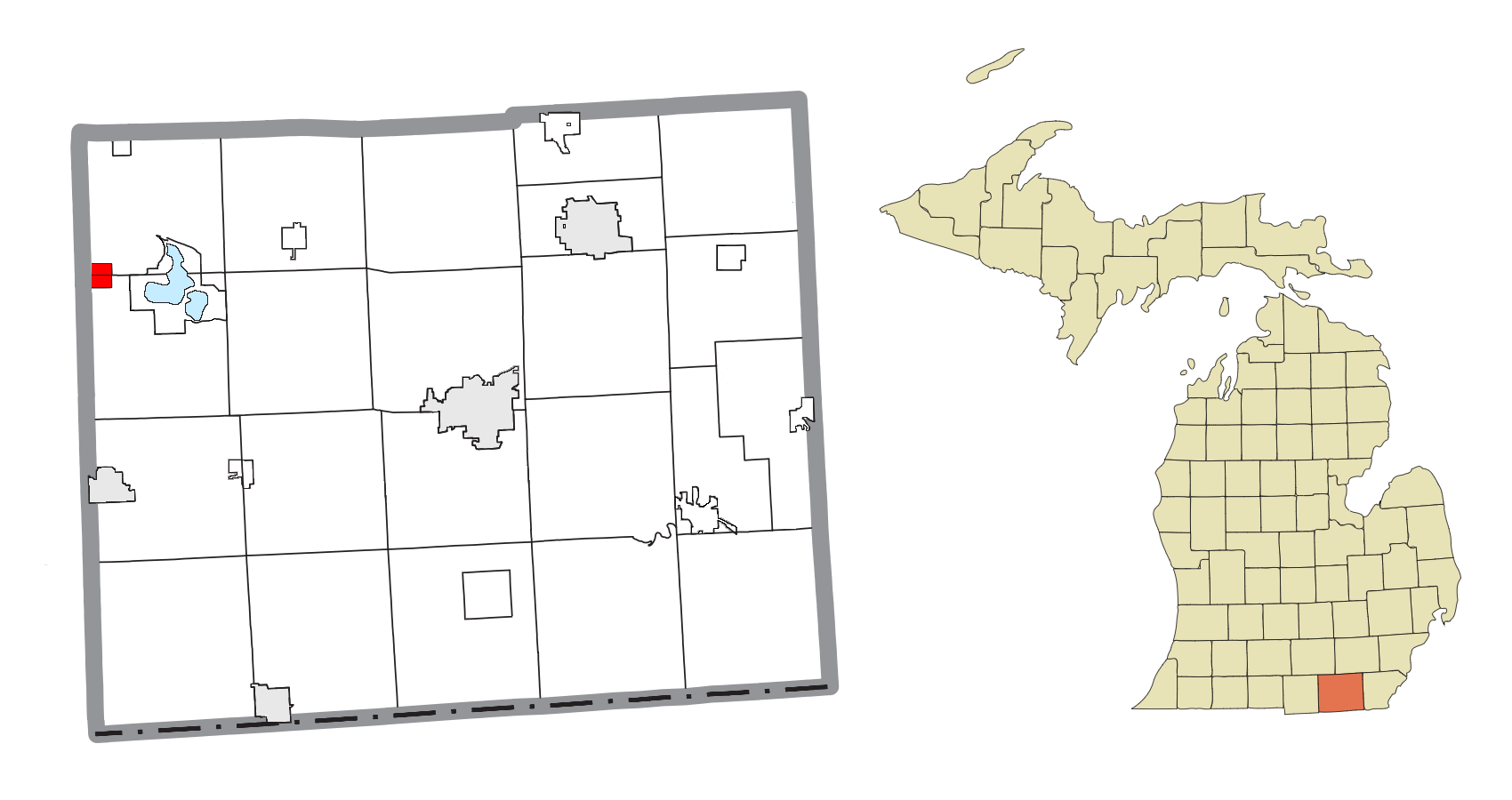
- Location within Lenawee County

- Location within the state of Michigan Location within the United States
- Coordinates: 41°59′10″N 84°20′57″W
- Country: United States
- State: Michigan
- County: Lenawee
- Townships: Rollin and Woodstock
- Incorporated: 1893

Area
  - Total: 1.00 sq mi (2.59 km^{2})
  - Land: 0.95 sq mi (2.47 km^{2})
  - Water: 0.042 sq mi (0.11 km^{2})
- Elevation: 1,066 ft (325 m)

Population (2020)
  - Total: 573
  - Density: 599.8/sq mi (231.57/km^{2})
- Time zone: UTC-5 (Eastern (EST))
  - Summer (DST): UTC-4 (EDT)
- ZIP code(s): 49220
- Area code: 517
- FIPS code: 26-00380
- GNIS feature ID: 2397912
- Website: Official website

Addison is a village in Lenawee County, Michigan, United States. As of the 2020 census, its population was 573. It is located on the boundary between Rollin Township on the south and Woodstock Township on the north.

== History ==
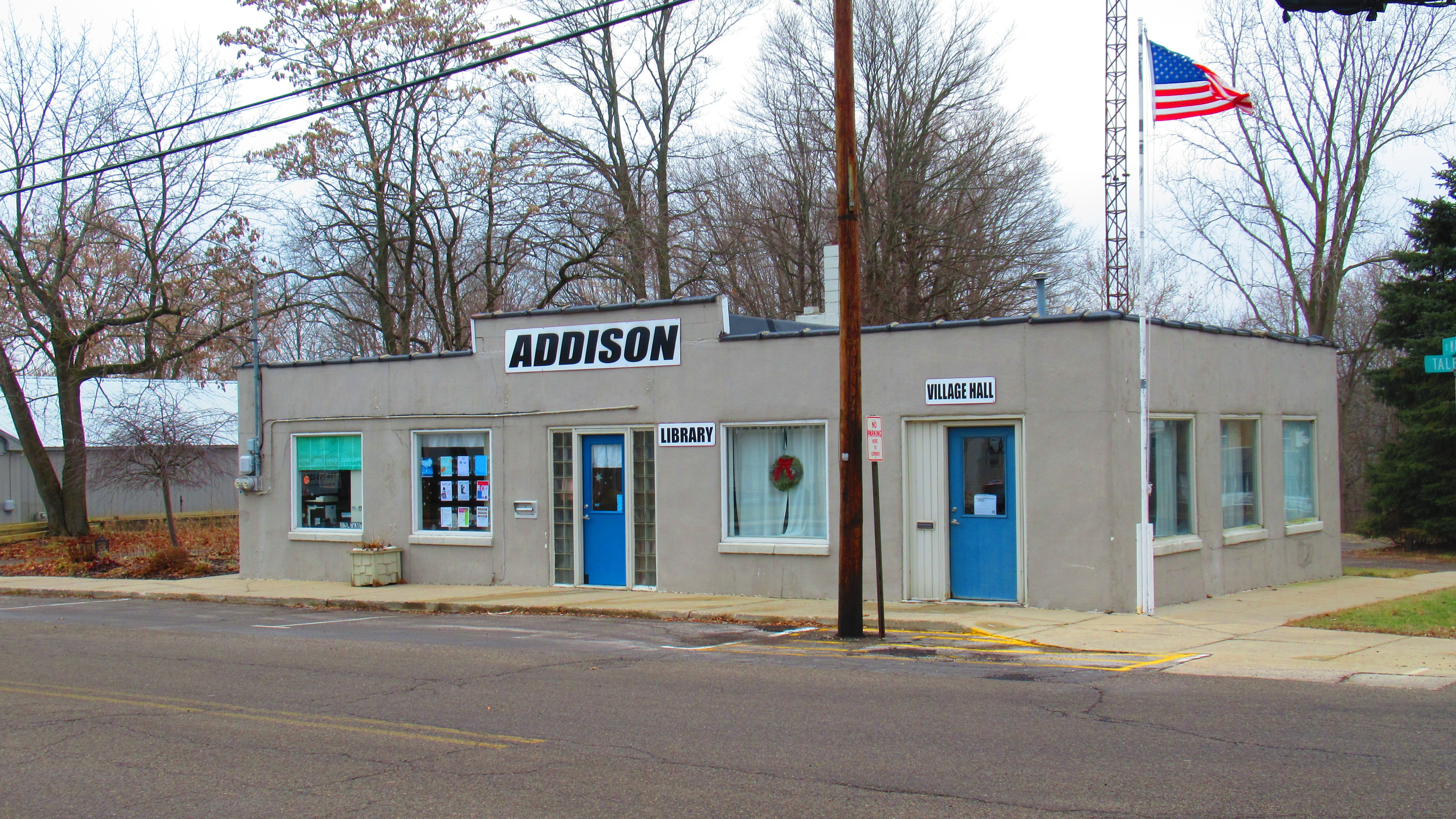
Addison Village Hall and Library

In 1834, three years before Michigan became a state, John Talbot settled along a winding creek in a vast forest, dotted with clear blue lakes and occupied by the Potawatomi. With the raising of a simple grist mill along Bean Creek around December 1835, Addison's history was started, operating under the settlement name “Manetue.”

Having failed to secure a spot along the river that provided enough water power to run his mill, Talbot dismantled the settlement and moved to the present location of Addison, and by the fall of 1836, milling operations restarted. The town was renamed “Peru” by 1838, and over the next generation would be given several other monikers before the final name of Addison was entered onto plat maps in 1851. Addison J. Comstock, a banker from Adrian, Michigan, purchased a sizable plat of the pioneer town and changed the identity to reflect this acquisition. The village itself was incorporated as such in 1893.

The village grew sufficiently to attract the railroad in 1883, an event which contributed to a sudden expansion of the local economy. Businesses came to Addison in great numbers including a three-story hotel, designed to cater to the visiting tourist. The Addison Courier newspaper started its 76-year run in 1884, and the economic upturn brought on by the railroad continued well after the line ceased to operate through Addison.

One of Addison's last landmarks, the old grist mill built in 1848, was removed in 1980. Despite the economic downturn of the village in the last half of the 20th century, a large 3-day sesquicentennial celebration was held in 1984. Additionally, a 175th Anniversary celebration spanning only one day was held in the village on August 8, 2009. In the later 2010s, the medical cannabis industry identified Addison as a community open to economic expansion with provisioning and grow centers. As of 2022, Addison has two open facilities and two additional operations under construction.

Two history books have been written on the village in recent years, "The History of Addison, Michigan" in 1996 and "Memories of Addison" in 2013, both by village historian Dan Cherry. Among the early village historians were A.J. Kempton, Richard DeGreene, J. DeWitt McLouth and Alice Slocum.

Addison got its own radio station in August 2014 with the sign-on of WQAR-LP "Q95 the Panther" at 95.7 FM. The station is owned by Addison Community Schools and programmed by students with classic rock music.

Addison Community Schools is a K-12 central campus with 797 students, first organized in 1887. The school's athletic program adopted red and black as its colors, and originally carried the nickname "Addison Millers." This was changed in 1945 to "Addison Panthers." The current superintendent is Scott Salow. The school mascot is a black panther.

== Geography ==
According to the United States Census Bureau, the village has a total area of 1.00 square mile (2.59 km^{2}), of which 0.96 square miles (2.49 km^{2}) is land and 0.04 square miles (0.10 km^{2}) is water.

== Demographics ==
Historical population
| Census | Pop. | Note | %± |
|---|---|---|---|
| 1880 | 291 | | — |
| 1890 | 425 | | 46.0% |
| 1900 | 470 | | 10.6% |
| 1910 | 474 | | 0.9% |
| 1920 | 416 | | −12.2% |
| 1930 | 452 | | 8.7% |
| 1940 | 465 | | 2.9% |
| 1950 | 488 | | 4.9% |
| 1960 | 575 | | 17.8% |
| 1970 | 595 | | 3.5% |
| 1980 | 655 | | 10.1% |
| 1990 | 632 | | −3.5% |
| 2000 | 627 | | −0.8% |
| 2010 | 605 | | −3.5% |
| 2020 | 573 | | −5.3% |
U.S. Decennial Census

=== 2010 census ===
As of the census of 2010, there were 605 people, 245 households, and 156 families residing in the village. The population density was 630.2 inhabitants per square mile (243.3/km^{2}). There were 274 housing units at an average density of 285.4 per square mile (110.2/km^{2}). The racial makeup of the village was 97.0% White, 0.5% African American, 0.3% from other races, and 2.1% from two or more races. Hispanic or Latino of any race were 1.0% of the population.

There were 245 households, of which 35.9% had children under the age of 18 living with them, 42.0% were married couples living together, 16.3% had a female householder with no husband present, 5.3% had a male householder with no wife present, and 36.3% were non-families. 28.2% of all households were made up of individuals, and 11.8% had someone living alone who was 65 years of age or older. The average household size was 2.47 and the average family size was 3.06.

The median age in the village was 35.1 years. 26.8% of residents were under the age of 18; 10% were between the ages of 18 and 24; 26.3% were from 25 to 44; 26.1% were from 45 to 64; and 10.7% were 65 years of age or older. The gender makeup of the village was 46.8% male and 53.2% female.

=== 2000 census ===
As of the census of 2000, there were 627 people, 247 households, and 164 families residing in the village. The population density was 642.6 inhabitants per square mile (248.1/km^{2}). There were 265 housing units at an average density of 271.6 per square mile (104.9/km^{2}). The racial makeup of the village was 98.41% White, 0.16% Native American, 0.96% Asian, 0.16% from other races, and 0.32% from two or more races. Hispanic or Latino of any race were 2.07% of the population.

There were 247 households, out of which 35.2% had children under the age of 18 living with them, 50.2% were married couples living together, 13.8% had a female householder with no husband present, and 33.2% were non-families. 29.6% of all households were made up of individuals, and 10.5% had someone living alone who was 65 years of age or older. The average household size was 2.54 and the average family size was 3.17.

In the village, the population was spread out, with 31.1% under the age of 18, 9.7% from 18 to 24, 28.2% from 25 to 44, 19.6% from 45 to 64, and 11.3% who were 65 years of age or older. The median age was 35 years. For every 100 females, there were 94.7 males. For every 100 females age 18 and over, there were 87.8 males.

The median income for a household in the village was $35,781, and the median income for a family was $45,313. Males had a median income of $31,875 versus $23,000 for females. The per capita income for the village was $15,883. About 6.0% of families and 8.1% of the population were below the poverty line, including 7.2% of those under age 18 and 7.8% of those age 65 or over.

== Transportation ==
- US 127 (Steer Street) intersects Main Street.

== Notable people ==
- Maxine Kline, professional baseball player of 1940s, was raised in Addison.
- Joseph H. Steere, Chief Justice of the Michigan Supreme Court, was born in Addison.
- Nick Smith, retired politician, born in Addison and 1953 Addison High School graduate. Served politically at the local, state and National level.
- John Randolph Bray, early animator, lived in Addison as a child. His father was a traveling minister who served the Methodist-Episcopal Church in Addison for a time.
