= Whiteford Agricultural Schools =

School district in Michigan

Address
- 6655 Consear Rd Ottawa Lake, Monroe County, Michigan, 49267; United States
- Coordinates: 41.7678°N 83.7031°W

District information
- Motto: Engaged in our Learning, Encouraged by our Community, and Empowered for our World.
- Grades: PreKindergarten–12
- Superintendent: Scott L. Huard
- Schools: 3
- Budget: $16,048,000 2022-2023 expenditures
- NCES District ID: 2636270

Students and staff
- Students: 831 (2024-2025)
- Teachers: 54.88 (on an FTE basis) (2024-2025)
- Staff: 114.48 FTE (2024-2025)
- Student–teacher ratio: 15.14 (2024-2025)
- District mascot: Bobcats
- Colors: Blue & Gold

Other information
- Website: www.whiteford.k12.mi.us

Whiteford Agriculutral Schools is a public school district in Southeast Michigan. In Monroe County, it serves Ottawa Lake and parts of the townships of Whiteford and Summferfield. In Lenawee County, it serves part of Riga Township.

== History ==
The many rural school districts within the district's present boundaries consolidated in 1954. As the district grew and the schools became crowded, attempts to build a junior/senior high school were slowed by litigation over the consolidation. Lenawee County residents on the edge of the district preferred to merge their districts with Blissfield Community Schools, so a compromise was worked out in court. Construction of the junior/high school began in 1957. The architect was Francis Faulhaber.

Whiteford Elementary opened in fall 1967, also designed by Francis Faulhaber. The old Ottawa Lake School, which was built in 1929, was sold in 1970.

Several renovation and addition projects were built in 2002. Projects included a metal gable roof added to the existing flat roof of the high school. A $15.4 million bond issue passed in 2019 to fund additions and renovations.

== Schools ==
Located just off US Highway 223, the high school and middle school are part of the same building, and the elementary school is located across the parking lot. They share an address of 6655 Consear Road in Ottawa Lake.

Schools in Whiteford Agricultural School District
School	Notes
Whiteford High School	Grades 9–12. Built 1957.
Whiteford Middle School	Grades 6–8. Shares a building with Whiteford High School.
Whiteford Elementary	Grades PreK-5. Built 1967.

== Sports ==
Whiteford won the MHSAA football championship for Division 8 in 2017 and 2022.
