= Blissfield Community Schools =

School district in Michigan

Address
- 630 S. Lane Street Blissfield, Lenawee County, Michigan, 49228; United States

District information
- Grades: Pre-Kindergarten–12
- President: David Brewer
- Vice-president: Vicki Lombard
- Superintendent: Scott Riley
- Accreditation: Cognia
- Schools: 3
- Budget: $15,308,000 2022-2023 expenditures
- NCES District ID: 2606000

Students and staff
- Students: 1,116 (2024-2025)
- Teachers: 83.35 (on an FTE basis) (2024-2025)
- Staff: 138.04 FTE (2024-2025)
- Student–teacher ratio: 13.39 (2024-2025)
- Athletic conference: Lenawee County Athletic Association
- District mascot: Royals
- Colors: Purple and Gold

Other information
- Website: www.blissfieldschools.us

Blissfield Community Schools is a public school district in Lenawee County, Michigan. It serves Blissfield and parts of the townships of Blissfield, Deerfield, Ogden, Palmyra, Raisin, Ridgeway, and Riga. It also serves part of Whiteford Township in Monroe County.

== History ==
Blissfield has had a high school since at least 1916, when it published its first yearbook. The former high school was located on the corner of Cherry Street and Giles Avenue in Blissfield.

The Blissfield School District reorganized around 1954 through the consolidation of several outlying districts. A bond issue to fund construction of a new high school passed in fall 1956, and construction was completed in fall 1958. The architect was Warren Holmes Company.

Originally, the high school athletes were called the Sugarboys because of the number of sugar beet farms in the area. The opening of the new high school came with a change of mascots as the Sugarboys became the Royals. The name of the student newspaper also changed from the Sugar Scoop to the Royal Jester.

== Schools ==
The district operates a high school, middle school, and elementary school on a campus at 630 South Lane Street in Blissfield.

Schools in Blissfield Community Schools district
School	Address	Notes
Blissfield High School	630 S. Lane Street, Blissfield	Grades 9-12
Blissfield Middle School	1305 Beamer Rd., Blissfield	Grades 6-8
Blissfield Elementary	640 S. Lane Street, Blissfield	Grades PreK-5
