= Whitmer High School =

Public, coeducational high school in Toledo, Ohio, United States

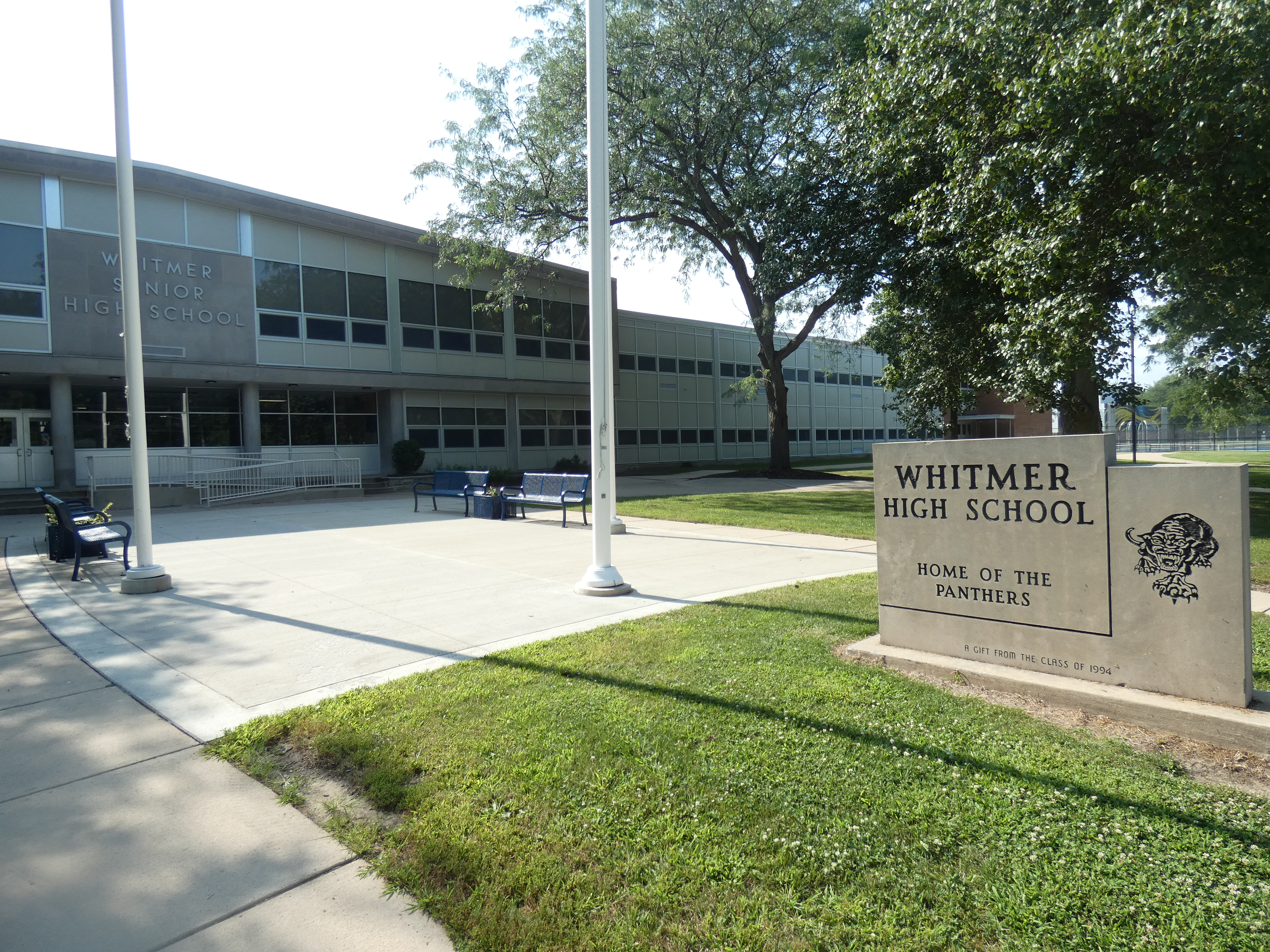
- Front portion of the school

Location
- 5601 Clegg Drive; Toledo, (Lucas County), Ohio 43613; United States; 41°43′7″N 83°36′40″W

Information
- Type: Public, coeducational high school
- Established: 1924
- School district: Washington Local School District
- Superintendent: Kristine Martin
- Principal: Jerry Bell
- Teaching staff: 109.00 (on an FTE basis)
- Grades: 9-12
- Enrollment: 2,229 (2023–2024)
- Student to teacher ratio: 20.45
- Colors: Maize and blue
- Fight song: Across The Field
- Athletics conference: Northern Lakes League
- Team name: Panthers
- Website: www.wls4kids.org/o/whs

Whitmer High School is a public high school in Toledo, Ohio, named for John Wallace Whitmer, an educator who helped organize high school classes for the area. It is the only high school in the Washington Local School District in Lucas County, Ohio, serving the northwest section of Toledo up to the Michigan state line. It is the largest high school in the Toledo area. Whitmer offers 200 courses including honors and AP classes, 16 career training programs, 22 varsity sports, and more than 50 extracurricular activities. Students regularly receive district, state, and national accolades in art, music, and career training competitions.

== History ==
Whitmer Senior High School opened in 1924 in the Jefferson building. In 1960, the Whitmer building opened. In 1974, the Whitmer Vocational Building, now the Career and Technology Center (CTC), opened.

=== Renovations ===
In 2006, Whitmer High School underwent several renovations. Among the renovations was a total overhaul of the Homer S. Nightingale Center for the Performing Arts, including an expanded lobby. A new gym and new Fieldhouse lobby were added to the school.

In 2007, Whitmer Memorial Stadium had artificial turf installed, and the track was widened. The endzones show a large "WHITMER" with a blue background and yellow lettering, with a white stroke.

== Athletics ==
The school's athletic teams are known as the Panthers, and their jersey colors are maize and blue. Whitmer High School is a member of the Ohio High School Athletic Association and the Northern Lakes League. The Panthers played in the Great Lakes League (GLL) until 2003 when they became members of the Toledo City League until 2011. Whitmer won GLL football titles in 1967 and 1968 before spending part of the early 1970s as an independent and then returning to the GLL. Whitmer won their first outright Toledo City League football title in 2009 with a 9-1 record. Whitmer had been playing many City League teams in all sports for years prior to joining the league. One of the school's biggest rivals are the Start Spartans; the two teams meet annually to play for the "Battle of Tremainsville". Another one of the school's biggest rivals are the Clay Eagles; Whitmer and Clay meet annually to play for the coveted "Little Brown Jug." During the GLL days, the Bedford Mules of Temperance, Michigan were the Panthers' biggest rival.

Whitmer High School is a member of the Ohio High School Athletic Association (OHSAA) and its football team has qualified for the state playoffs for four of the last five years. The 1986 team went undefeated and 1987 and 1988 made it to the state semi-finals. Led by senior Ryne Smith, the 2007-2008 Panthers made an unexpected run to the state final four in basketball. 2010 City League Football champions and Regional State Champions with a 12-2 overall record. 2010-2011 City League Basketball Champions with an overall 19-1 record. In 2011, after being picked to finish 6th in the Toledo City League, the Whitmer Varsity baseball team defeated the Start Spartans 10-8 in the final TCL Championship after falling behind 8-1. The win also secured Whitmer with its first ever All-Sports Trophy in the CL.

== Notable alumni ==
- Tom Amstutz, University of Toledo head football coach
- Chris Black, Screenwriter
- David Curson, Congressman from Michigan
- Matt Eberflus, former Head Coach of the Chicago Bears
- Stanton Glantz, Director of the Center for Tobacco Control Research and Education
- Nigel Hayes, Wisconsin Badgers men's basketball player and former NBA prospect
- Brad Hennessey, MLB pitcher
- Nate Holley, NFL player
- Phil Hoskins, NFL player
- Pat Jablonski, NHL goalie
- Kevin Koger, NFL coach
- Lou Marotti, professional football player
- Brent Miller, film and television producer
- Storm Norton, NFL Offensive Tackle
- Adrianne Palicki, television and film actress
- Daniel Poneman, Deputy Secretary of Energy
- Ron Rightnowar, MLB pitcher
- Greg Rosenbaum, CEO of Empire Kosher Poultry, Inc.
- Gene Ward, Minority Leader Emeritus, Hawaii State House of Representatives, Honolulu
- Heath Wingate, NFL player
- Greg Wojciechowski, wrestling champion
- Chris Wormley, NFL Defensive Tackle
