= Blissfield High School =

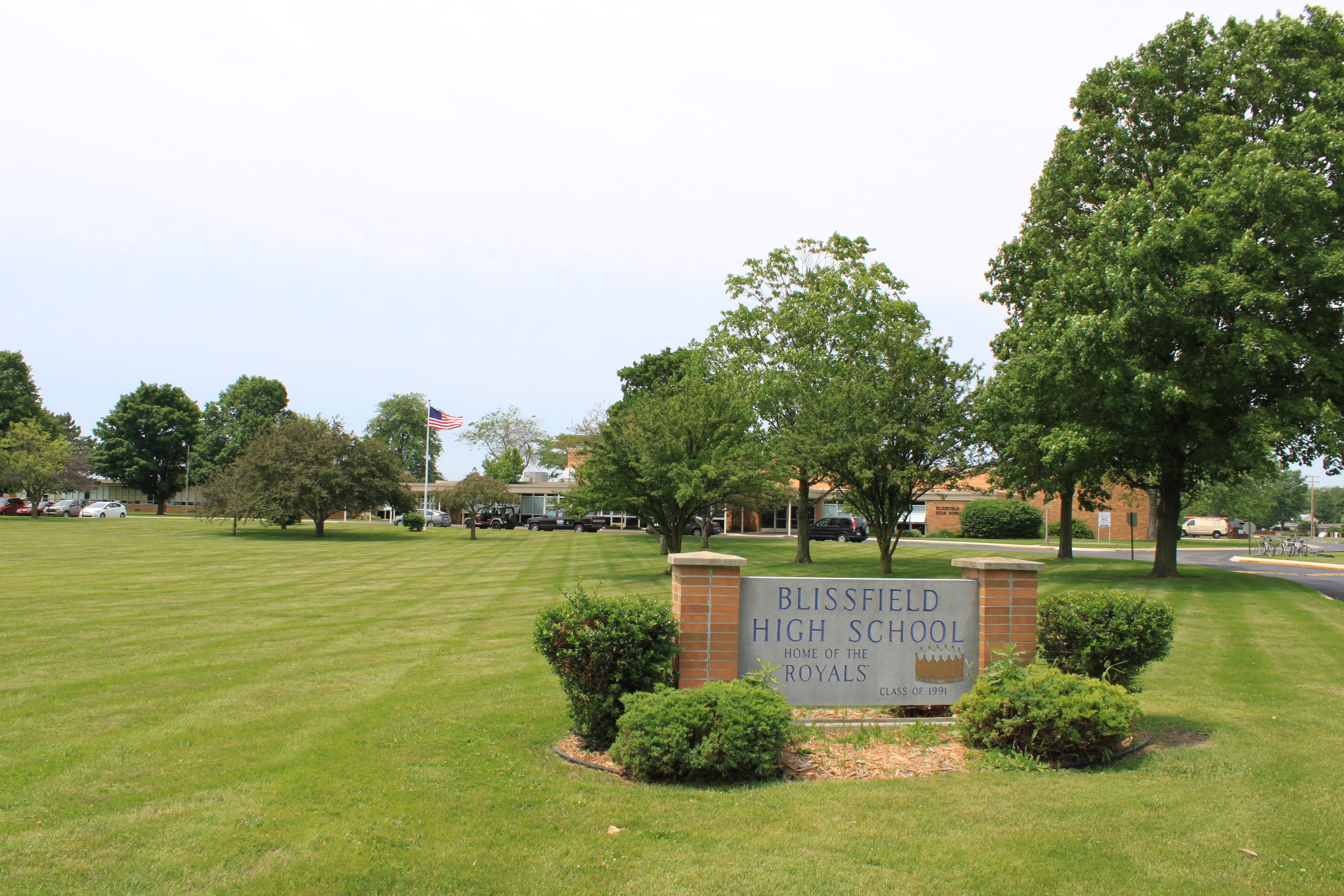

Location
- 630 South Lane Street; Blissfield, Michigan 49228; United States; 41°49′22″N 83°51′59″W

Information
- Type: Public secondary
- Established: 1958
- School district: Blissfield Community Schools
- Superintendent: Scott Riley
- Principal: Michael Bader
- Teaching staff: 29.00 (on a FTE basis)
- Enrollment: 338 (2023-2024)
- Student to teacher ratio: 11.66
- Colors: Purple and gold
- Athletics conference: Lenawee County Athletic Association
- Mascot: Leo the Lion
- Nickname: Royals
- Website: www.blissfieldschools.us/highschool/

Blissfield High School is a public high school serving grades 9–12 in Blissfield, Michigan, United States.

== History ==
Prior to 1958, the district was served by a series of smaller rural schools. The initial nickname for the school district was the Blissfield Sugar Boys. This name referred to the large sugar beet production in the area. When the current high school opened in the fall of 1958, the name was changed to the Blissfield Royals. Burdett Peebles was the first principal of the new school.

== Athletics ==
The Blissfield Royals compete in the Lenawee County Athletic Association. The school colors are purple and gold. The following MHSAA sanctioned sports are offered:

- Baseball (boys)
- Basketball (girls & boys)
- Bowling (girls & boys)
- Competitive Cheer (girls)
- Cross Country (girls & boys)
- Football (boys)
- Golf (boys)
- Soccer (girls & boys)
- Softball (girls)
- Track & Field (girls & boys)
- Volleyball (girls)
- Wrestling (boys)

== Notable alumni ==
- Brad Fischer (1978), professional baseball coach and player
- Ray Soff (1976), professional baseball player
