= Greg Rosenbaum =

American businessman and investor

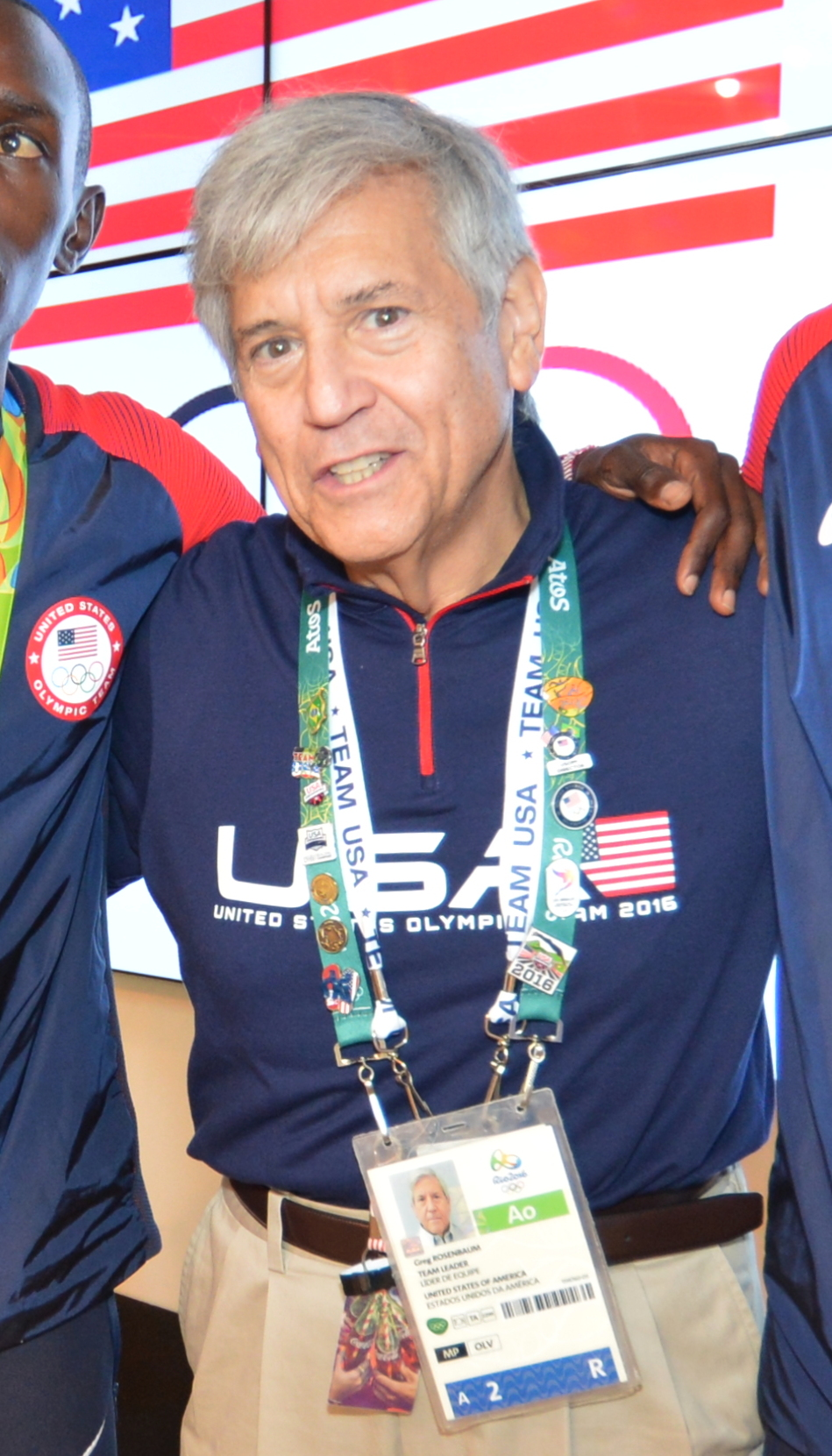
- Born: August 7, 1952 (age 74); Toledo, Ohio
- Education: Harvard University
- Occupation: Businessman
- Spouse: Marti Rosenabum
- Children: 3

Greg A. Rosenbaum (born August 7, 1952) is an American businessman. He is based in Bethesda, Maryland. He is the founder and president of Palisades Associates, a private equity firm.

In 1987, he was one of the co-founders of the Carlyle Group, but left within the year.

He is co-executive chairman and a minority investor in the Dayton Dragons minor league baseball club, and a partner in the Mahoning Valley Scrappers of the MLB Draft League.

== Early life and education ==
Rosenbaum was born to a Jewish family in Toledo, Ohio and attended Whitmer High School, the middle child of three brothers. His father, Marvin Rosenbaum, was a furniture salesman and later the owner of a premiums and incentives distributor, and his mother, Edith Millman Rosenbaum, was a vice president at a local advertising agency.

Rosenbaum graduated from Harvard College in 1974 with an A.B. in Government. At Harvard, Rosenbaum was a member of the winning team at the 1974 collegiate National Debate Tournament.

He received a joint Juris Doctor and Master of Public Policy from Harvard Law School and Harvard Kennedy School in 1977. At Harvard Law he was a member of the winning team in the 1976 Ames Moot Court Competition.

In 1979, he was one of the coaches for Harvard's National Debate Tournament-winning team. Rosenbaum and his debate partner Charles Garvin were voted the second-best policy debate team of the 1970s in a poll of contemporary debate coaches and participants.

== Career ==
Rosenbaum began his business career in 1978 at the Boston Consulting Group. In 1982, he was named vice president of the Dyson-Kissner-Moran Corporation, a private investment firm that pioneered leveraged buyouts.

In 1987, Rosenbaum was one of the five founders of the Carlyle Group. He left within the first year.

In 1989, Rosenbaum founded Palisades Associates, Inc., a Bethesda, Maryland-based private equity firm, and he is its president.

From 2003 to 2010, he was the Chairman of TVC Communications, LLC, a distributor to the broadband industry, until its purchase by WESCO International.

From 2003 to 2012 Rosenbaum was the Chairman of Empire Kosher Poultry, Inc., the largest producer of kosher poultry in the United States, and from 2006 to 2012 he was the company's chief executive officer.

In 2014, Rosenbaum was one of the lead investors in a group that purchased the Dayton Dragons, the Class A-Advanced minor league affiliate of the Cincinnati Reds, from Mandalay Sports Entertainment. In 2025, the Dragons were purchased by Diamond Baseball Holdings, a subsidiary of the investment firm Silver Lake.

In 2016, Rosenbaum became a partner in the Mahoning Valley Scrappers, which at the time were a team in the Cleveland Guardians minor league system. In 2021 they joined the MLB Draft League.

== Additional activities ==
=== Policy debate ===
Rosenbaum is on the board of directors of Harvard Debate, Inc, and is a former trustee and chair of the National Debate Tournament.

In 2011, Rosenbaum was named to the board of directors of the National Association for Urban Debate Leagues.

=== Politics ===
Rosenbaum is on the board of the Center for American Progress Action Fund (CAP Action).

Rosenbaum was vice chair of the Platform Committee for the 2016 Democratic National Convention.

In 2013, President Barack Obama appointed Rosenbaum to the United States Holocaust Memorial Council, the governing body of the United States Holocaust Memorial Museum, on which he served until January 2017. From 2011 to 2016, Rosenbaum was on the board of directors of the National Jewish Democratic Council (NJDC), and from 2014 to 2016, he served as the NJDC's chair. In the 2012 election cycle, Rosenbaum was a co-chair of NJDC's political action committee.

Rosenbaum was a charter member of the Clinton Global Initiative and was listed as a donor in reports released by the Clinton Foundation. At the Harvard Kennedy School, Rosenbaum is a vice chair of the HKS Fund Executive Council and was previously a member of the Dean's Council.

== Philanthropy ==
In 2011, the Metropolitan Council on Jewish Poverty granted Rosenbaum its Humanitarian Award. As the CEO of Empire Kosher, Rosenbaum oversaw the donation of kosher food products to community food pantries.

In 2009, the Philadelphia Jewish Labor Committee granted Rosenbaum, along with U.S. Senator Bob Casey, a Labor Human Rights Award. In 2007, the Jewish Labor Committee granted Rosenbaum a National Trade Union Council for Human Rights Award.

Rosenbaum is a past board member of the United States Olympic and Paralympic Foundation, which supports the United States Olympic and Paralympic teams, as well as the USA Swimming Foundation.

== Personal life ==
Rosenbaum is married to Marti Rosenbaum, and they have three children and two grandchildren.
