= Whiteford Township, Michigan =

Civil township in Michigan, US

- Civil township
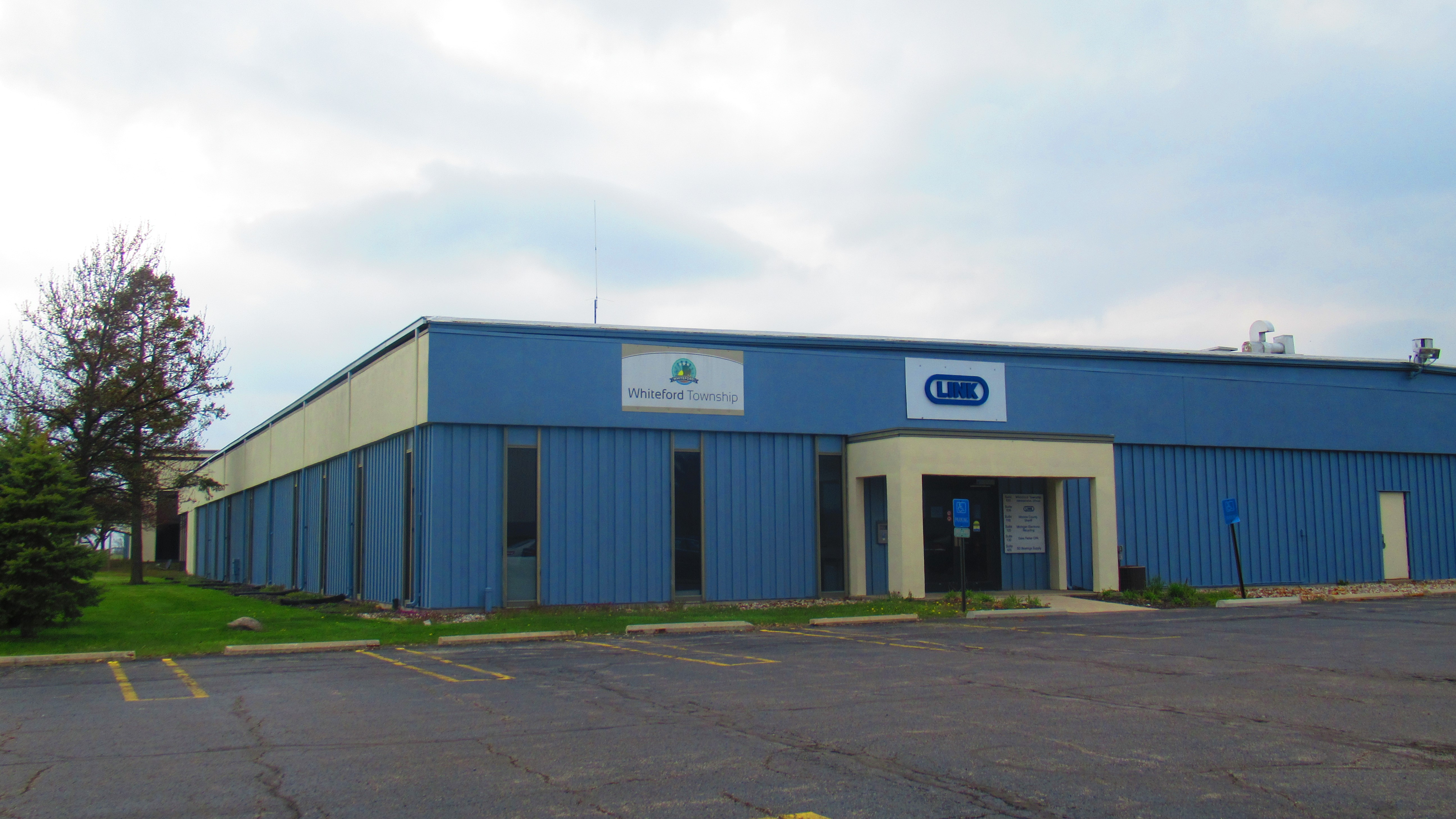
- Whiteford Township Administrative Offices

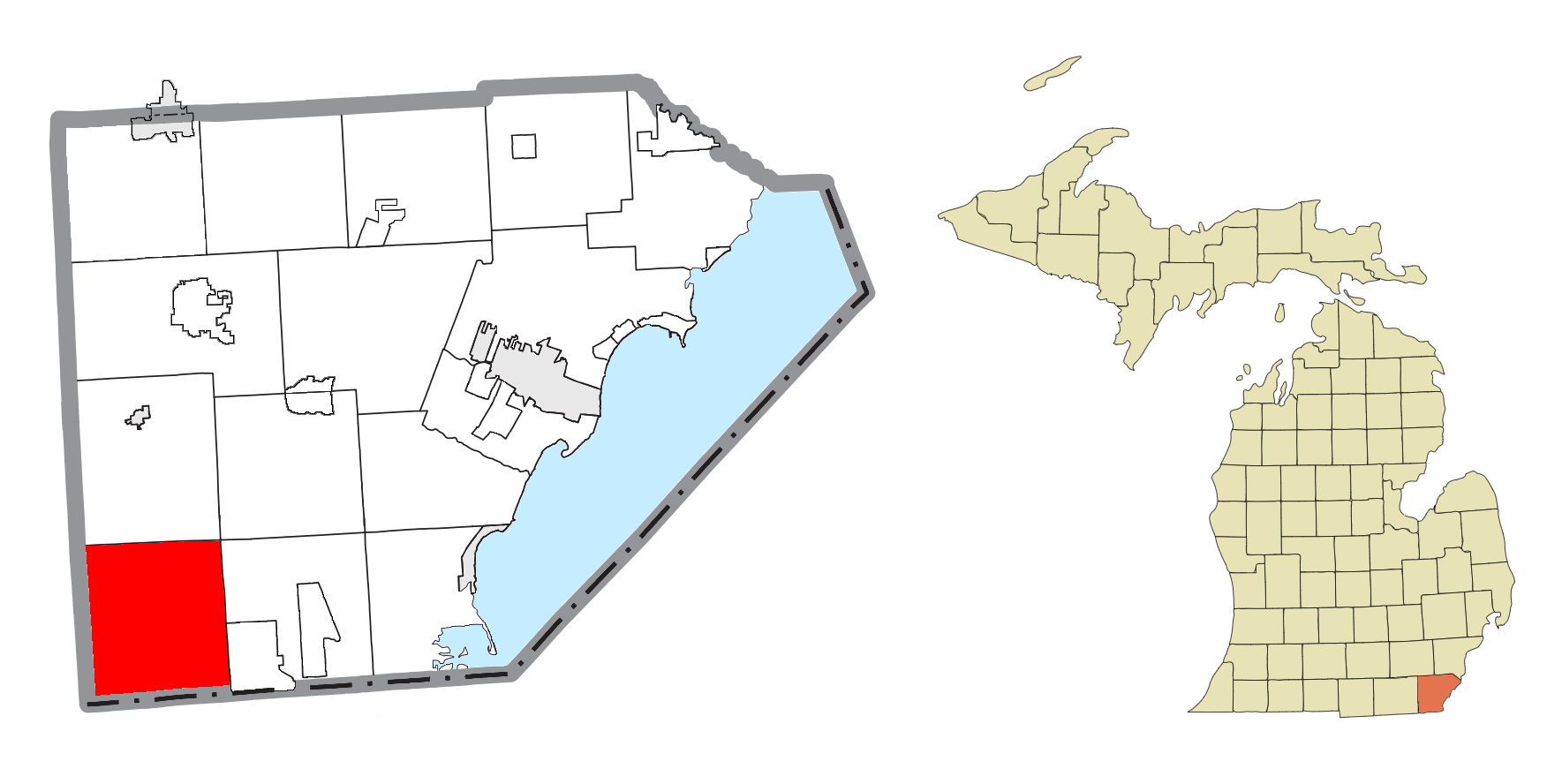
- Location within Monroe County and the state of Michigan

- Location within the state of Michigan Location within the United States
- Coordinates: 41°46′43″N 83°41′28″W
- Country: United States
- State: Michigan
- County: Monroe
- Established: 1834

Government
  - Supervisor: Walter Ruhl
  - Clerk: Angela Christensen

Area
  - Total: 40.24 sq mi (104.22 km^{2})
  - Land: 39.72 sq mi (102.87 km^{2})
  - Water: 0.52 sq mi (1.35 km^{2})
- Elevation: 679 ft (207 m)

Population (2020)
  - Total: 4,590
  - Density: 115.6/sq mi (44.6/km^{2})
- Time zone: UTC-5 (Eastern (EST))
  - Summer (DST): UTC-4 (EDT)
- ZIP Codes: 49267 (Ottawa Lake); 49276 (Riga); 49270 (Petersburg); 48182 (Temperance); 48144 (Lambertville)
- Area code: 734
- FIPS code: 26-115-86740
- GNIS feature ID: 1627261
- Website: whitefordtownshipmi.gov

Whiteford Township is a civil township of Monroe County in the U.S. state of Michigan. The population was 4,590 at the 2020 census.

== Early history ==
Whiteford Township was organized in March 1834 and carved out of western parts of Erie Township and the former Port Lawrence Township. It was named after Gen. David White, the township's first supervisor and a pioneer settler. At the time of founding, Whiteford Township was a much larger township in land area than it is today. It originally extended into present-day Ohio, when that part of the state (known as the Toledo Strip) was claimed by both Ohio and Michigan during the Toledo War. This larger Whiteford Township included most of present-day Sylvania, Sylvania Township, northern Springfield Township, and a small section of present-day Toledo north of Airport Highway between Reynolds Road and Holland-Sylvania. However, by December 1836, the boundary dispute between Ohio and Michigan had been settled, the Toledo Strip was awarded to Ohio, and Whiteford Township subsequently lost all of its territory south of this newly agreed upon state boundary.

Throughout the mid and late 19th century, most of the land in the township was used agriculturally, with many of the square-mile sections divided up into parcels of 40 to 160 acres (16 to 65 ha). In 1880, over 95% of the householders residing there were occupied as farmers or farm laborers. Merchants and manufacturers could be found in the unincorporated settlements of Whiteford Center and Ottawa Lake, the latter being home to a large stave mill in which residents were employed during the 1870s and 1880s.

In 1880, the total population of the township was 2,044, of which 2,030 residents were classified as White and 14 were listed as Black/Mulatto. By 1900 the population had risen to 2,050, with all residents listed as White.

== Communities ==
- Gert is a former community within the township. It had its own post office from February 16, 1885, until March 31, 1904. Gert can be seen within Whiteford Township on a 1911 map of Monroe County.
- Ottawa Lake is an unincorporated community within the township at 41°45′50″N 83°44′57″W. Ottawa Lake has its own post office with the 49267 ZIP Code, which serves the majority of the township.
- Pleasant View is a former community within the township. It appeared along the Toledo, Ann Arbor and North Michigan Railway line and can be seen in section 36 on an 1876 map of Whiteford Township.
- Saint Anthony is an unincorporated community located at 41°47′57″N 83°39′21″W. The community was settled in 1920 as a location between Ottawa Lake and Temperance.
- Whiteford was the original settlement of Whiteford Township when it was organized in 1834. The Whiteford post office was established on June 2, 1835, but was quickly transferred to Toledo on September 19, which was then still part of Monroe County in the Michigan Territory.
- Whiteford Center (or Whiteford Centre) is an unincorporated community located in the east-central part of the township at 41°46′36″N 83°40′59″W. It was settled as early as 1840 and contained its own post office from June 26, 1867, until September 30, 1905.

== Geography ==
Whiteford Township occupies the southwest corner of Monroe County. Its western border is the Lenawee County line, and its southern border is the Ohio state line. The city of Sylvania, Ohio, borders the township to the south.

According to the U.S. Census Bureau, the township has a total area of 40.24 square miles (104.22 km^{2}), of which 39.72 square miles (102.87 km^{2}) are land and 0.52 square miles (1.35 km^{2}), or 1.29%, are water.

=== Major highways ===
- US 23 crosses the township from north to south.
- US 223 runs west from US 23 into Lenawee County.

== Demographics ==
Historical population
Census	Pop.	Note	%±
1850	696		—
1860	1,136		63.2%
1870	1,427		25.6%
1880	2,044		43.2%
1890	1,901		−7.0%
1900	2,050		7.8%
1910	1,686		−17.8%
1920	1,741		3.3%
1930	2,205		26.7%
1940	2,314		4.9%
1950	2,793		20.7%
1960	3,641		30.4%
1970	4,059		11.5%
1980	4,660		14.8%
1990	4,433		−4.9%
2000	4,420		−0.3%
2010	4,602		4.1%
2020	4,590		−0.3%
U.S. Decennial Census

As of the census of 2000, there were 4,420 people, 1,582 households, and 1,243 families residing in the township. The population density was 111.0 inhabitants per square mile (42.9/km^{2}). There were 1,654 housing units at an average density of 41.5 per square mile (16.0/km^{2}). The racial makeup of the township was 95.41% White, 1.97% African American, 0.07% Native American, 0.20% Asian, 1.49% from other races, and 0.86% from two or more races. Hispanic or Latino of any race were 2.49% of the population.

There were 1,582 households, out of which 35.0% had children under the age of 18 living with them, 69.4% were married couples living together, 6.3% had a female householder with no husband present, and 21.4% were non-families. 18.1% of all households were made up of individuals, and 6.3% had someone living alone who was 65 years of age or older. The average household size was 2.77 and the average family size was 3.17.

In the township the population was spread out, with 26.2% under the age of 18, 7.4% from 18 to 24, 28.1% from 25 to 44, 27.4% from 45 to 64, and 10.9% who were 65 years of age or older. The median age was 39 years. For every 100 females, there were 103.9 males. For every 100 females age 18 and over, there were 100.9 males.

The median income for a household in the township was $56,280, and the median income for a family was $61,667. Males had a median income of $47,950 versus $26,275 for females. The per capita income for the township was $21,899. About 3.1% of families and 5.1% of the population were below the poverty line, including 4.6% of those under age 18 and 4.6% of those age 65 or over.

== Images ==
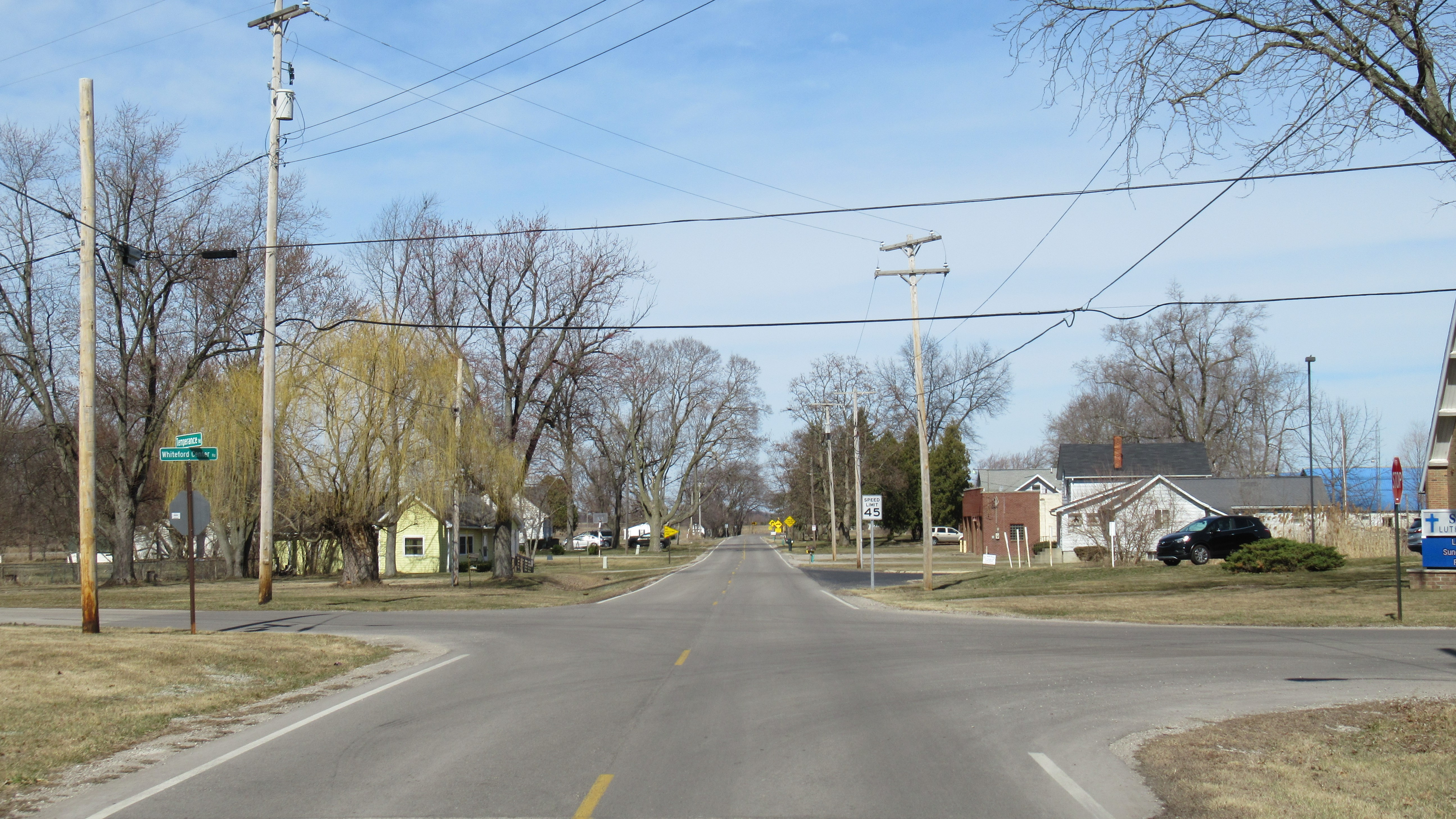
Community of Whiteford Center

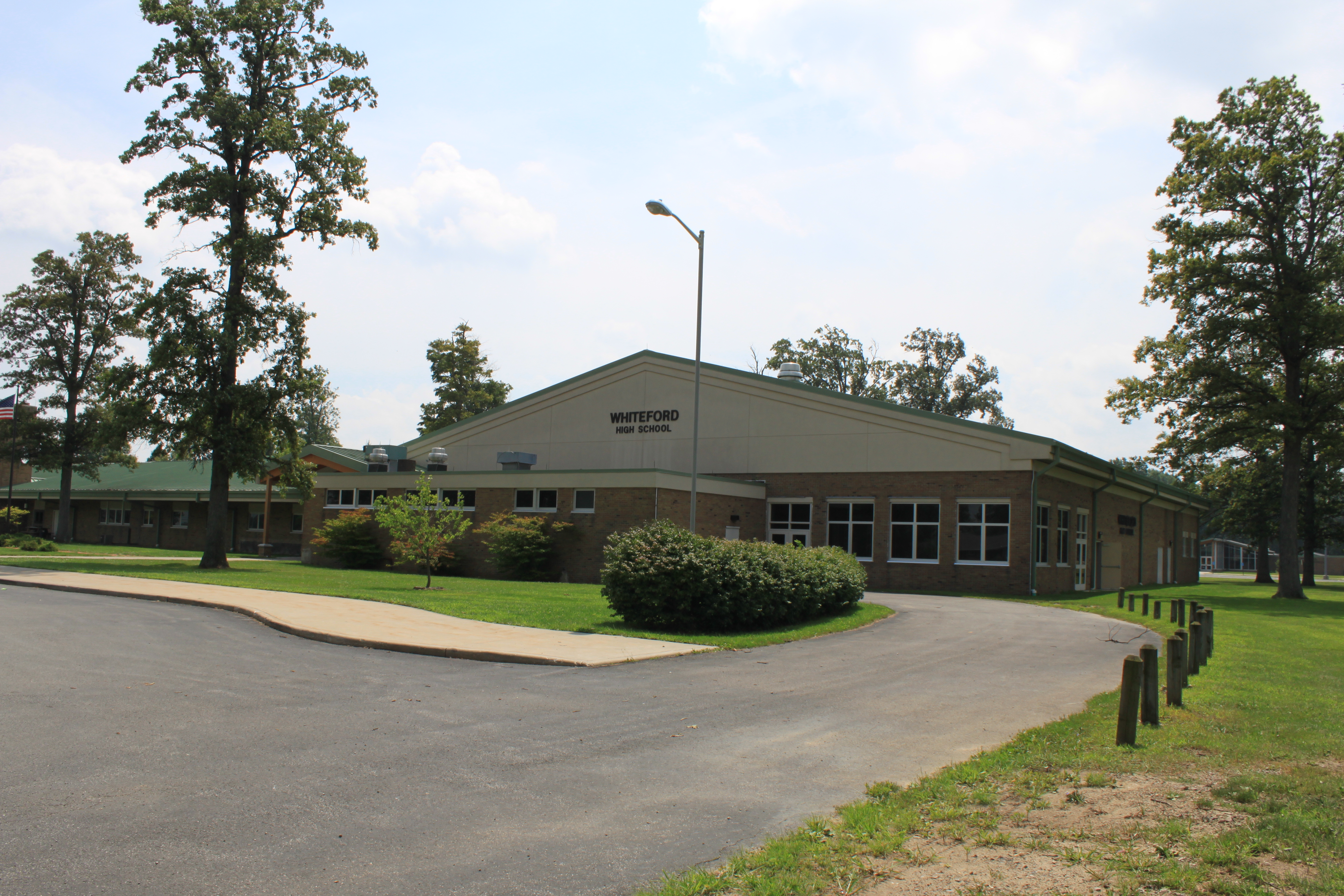
Whiteford High School

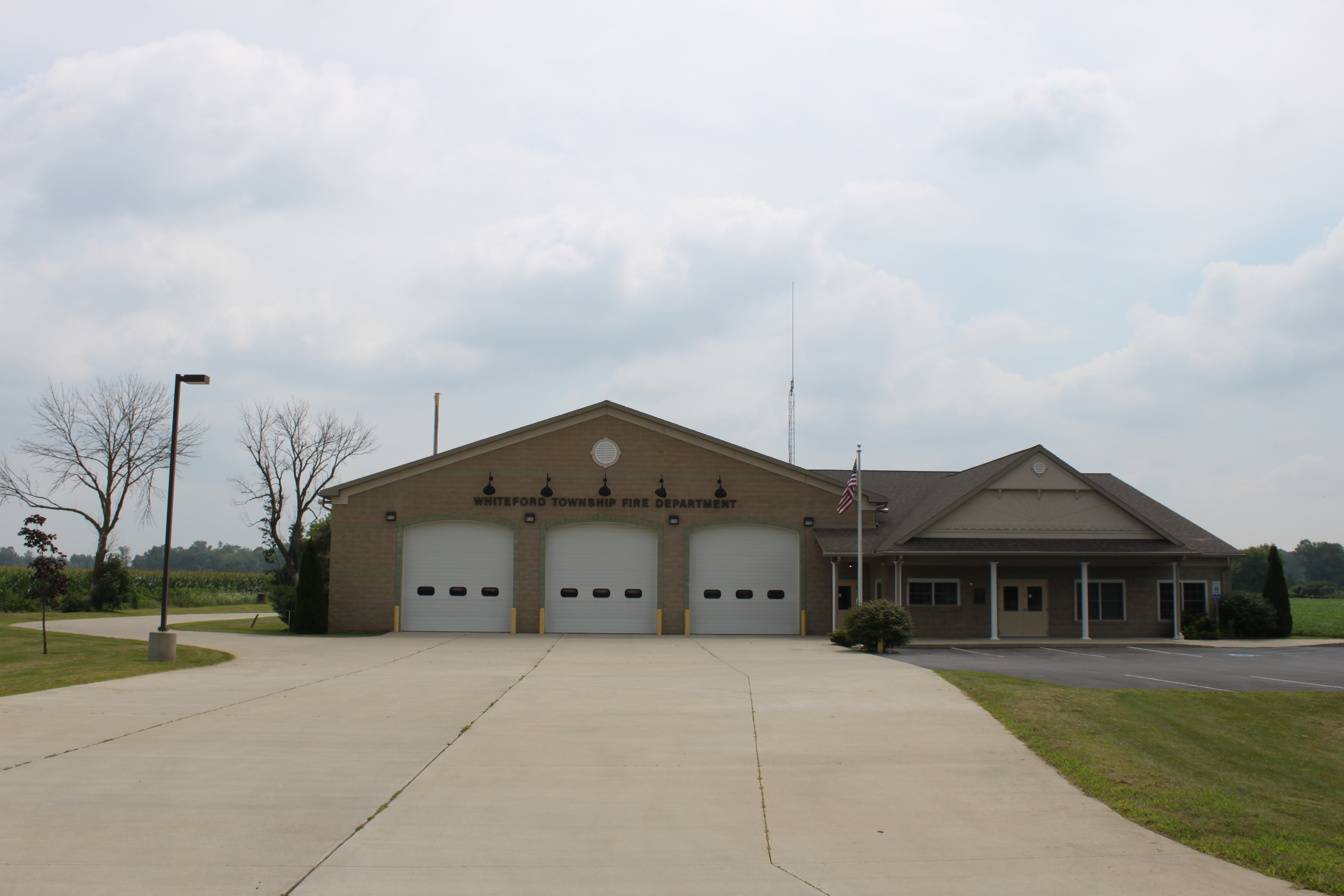
Whiteford Township Fire Department

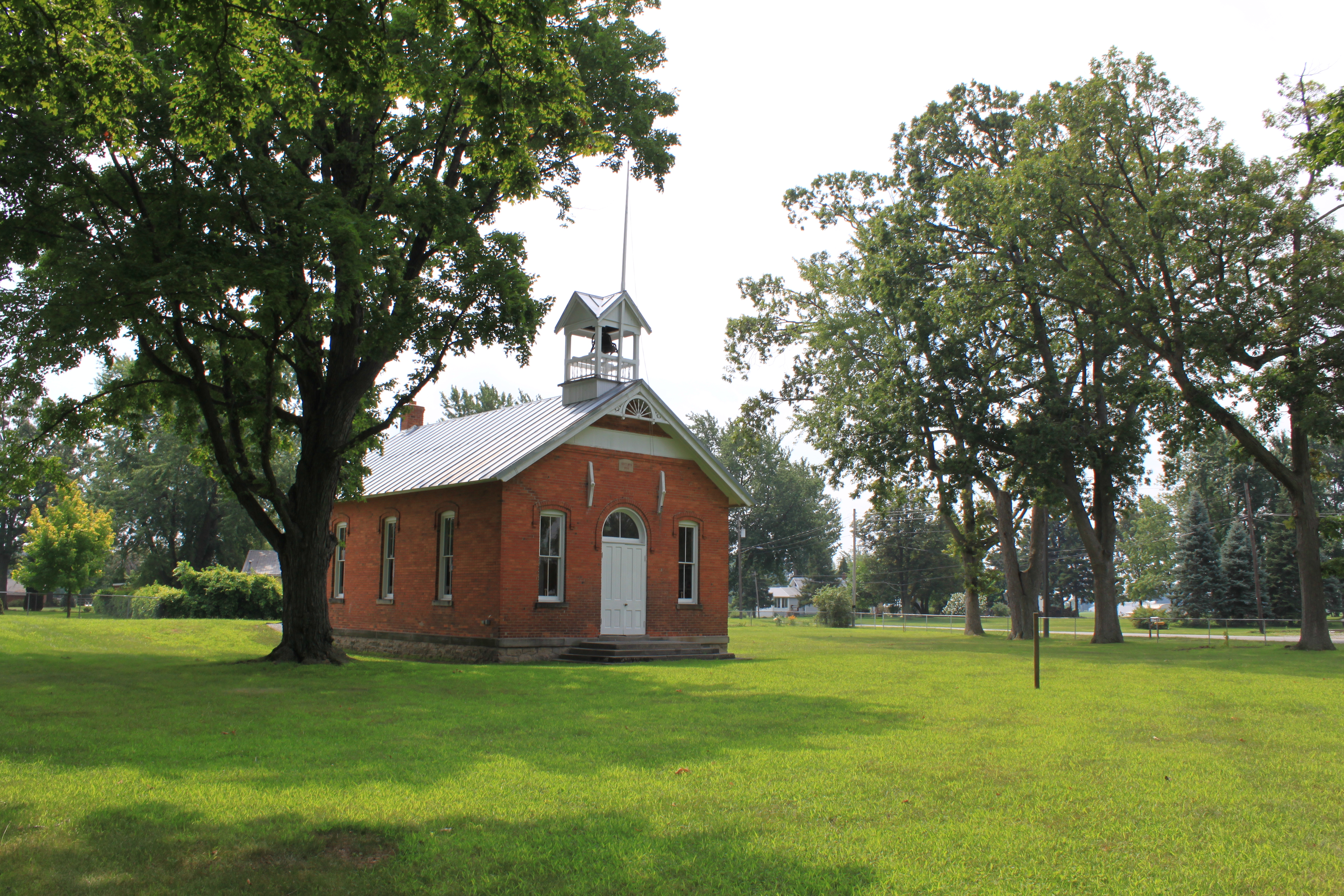
Defunct Whiteford Schoolhouse, built in 1888

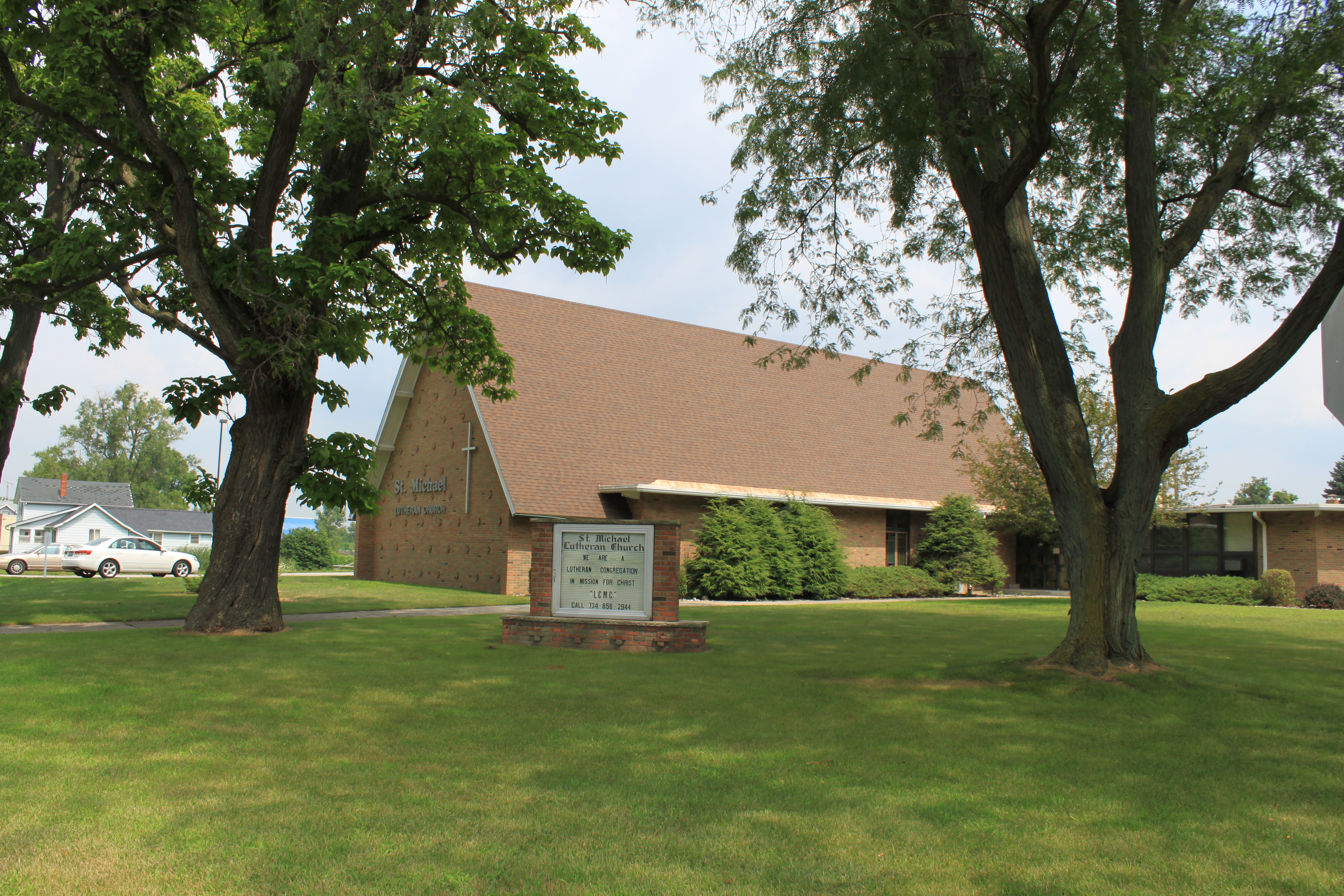
St. Michael Lutheran Church
