= Nate Holley =

American gridiron football player (born 1994)

No. 36
- Position: Safety

Personal information
- Born: December 5, 1994 (age 31); Ottawa Lake, Michigan, U.S.
- Listed height: 6 ft 1 in (1.85 m)
- Listed weight: 210 lb (95 kg)

Career information
- High school: Whitmer (Toledo, Ohio)
- College: Kent State
- NFL draft: 2017: undrafted

Career history
- Minnesota Vikings (2017)*; Nebraska Danger (2018); Los Angeles Rams (2018)*; Calgary Stampeders (2019); Miami Dolphins (2020); Birmingham Stallions (2022–2023)
- * Offseason or practice squad member only

Awards and highlights
- USFL champion (2023); CFL Most Outstanding Rookie (2019); Jackie Parker Trophy (2019); 2× First-team All-MAC (2014, 2015)

Career NFL statistics
- Total tackles: 3
- Stats at Pro Football Reference

Career CFL statistics
- Total tackles: 100
- Sacks: 1.0
- Interceptions: 1
- Stats at CFL.ca

Nate Holley (born December 5, 1994) is an American former professional football player who was a safety in the National Football League (NFL) and Canadian Football League (CFL). Holley played high school football at Whitmer High School in Toledo, Ohio. He played college football for the Kent State Golden Flashes. He has been a member of the Minnesota Vikings, Nebraska Danger, Los Angeles Rams, Calgary Stampeders, Miami Dolphins, and Birmingham Stallions.

== College career ==
Holley played four seasons at Kent State University, appearing in 43 games for the Golden Flashes, contributing with 424 tackles, three sacks and one interception. He finished his collegiate career in the top 10 on the Golden Flashes’ all-time tackles list. During his senior season, he led the nation with an average of 8.9 solo tackles per game. For his career, he had 426 total tackles including 15 tackles for loss, three sacks, one interception, two forced fumbles and seven pass breakups. He was named first-team all-Mid-American Conference in 2014 and 2015.

== Professional career ==
Pre-draft measurables
Height	Weight	Arm length	Hand span	40-yard dash	10-yard split	20-yard split	20-yard shuttle	Three-cone drill	Vertical jump	Broad jump	Bench press
5 ft 11 1/4 in (1.81 m)	209 lb (95 kg)	29 1/2 in (0.75 m)	9 1/8 in (0.23 m)	4.68 s	1.57 s	2.65 s	4.25 s	6.96 s	33.5 in (0.85 m)	9 ft 6 in (2.90 m)	15 reps
All values from Pro Day

=== Early career ===
After going undrafted in the 2017 NFL draft Holley signed with the Minnesota Vikings, but was later released. He signed with the Indoor Football League’s Nebraska Danger on May 22, 2018; Holley played in only 2 games with Nebraska, but still put up an impressive 23 tackles and a forced fumble. Holley next signed with the Los Angeles Rams on June 8, 2018, but was waived at the conclusion of training camp.

=== Calgary Stampeders ===
Holley signed with the Calgary Stampeders of the Canadian Football League (CFL) on May 19, 2019. Holley had a very productive first season in the league, playing in all 18 regular season games and contributing with 78 defensive tackles, 22 special teams tackles, one sack and one interception. Following the season he was named the league's Most Outstanding Rookie. On February 14, 2020, the CFLPA filed a grievance against the CFL on behalf of Holley. Holley sought to be released from his contract so he could pursue NFL opportunities, as was the agreement when he signed his two-year contract the year prior. In late April, after the NFL window had closed, the CFLPA announced that they were taking Holley's case to arbitration. The CFL cancelled their 2020 season on August 17, and Holley was released from his contract two days later.

=== Miami Dolphins ===
Holley had a tryout with the Miami Dolphins on August 21, 2020. He signed with the team the next day. He was waived on September 5, and re-signed with the team's practice squad the following day. Holley was elevated to the active roster on December 5 and December 9 for the team's Weeks 13 and 14 games against the Cincinnati Bengals and Kansas City Chiefs, and reverted to the practice squad after each game. He was promoted to the active roster on January 2, 2021.

On August 31, 2021, Holley was waived by the Dolphins.

=== Toronto Argonauts ===
On November 3, 2021, it was announced that Holley had signed with the Toronto Argonauts. However, on November 17, the league announced that they would not register his contract due to a violation with their Violence Against Women Policy.

=== Birmingham Stallions ===
On March 10, 2022, Holley was selected by the Birmingham Stallions of the United States Football League. He was placed on injured reserve on May 19, with a lower leg injury. Holley was not part of the roster after the 2024 UFL dispersal draft on January 15, 2024.

== Personal life ==
Holley has a twin named Nick, who is a running back. They played college football together at Kent State and were on the Los Angeles Rams and Nebraska Danger together.

In early November 2016 Holley was charged with felony kidnapping and assault. He was immediately suspended by the NCAA and released by the Kent State Golden Flashes football program. In February 2017, three months after being charged, Holley was found not guilty.

Nate has a youtube channel with videos at: https://www.youtube.com/@nateholley8180
