= Washington Local School District (Lucas County) =

School district in Ohio, United States

Address
- 3505 West Lincolnshire Boulevard Toledo, Ohio, 43606; United States
- Coordinates: 41°41′01″N 83°37′57″W

District information
- Type: Public
- Grades: KG–12
- Superintendent: Kristine Martin
- Schools: 11
- NCES District ID: 3904823

Students and staff
- Students: 6,663 (2025–2026)
- Teachers: 349.25 (on an FTE basis) (2025–2026)
- Staff: 1,069.46 (on an FTE basis) (2025–2026)
- Student–teacher ratio: 19.08 (2025–2026)

Other information
- Website: www.wls4kids.org

Washington Local School District is a school district in Northwest Ohio. The school district serves students who live in Lucas County. Washington Local Schools is located in Toledo, Ohio, and students who attend must be residents living within the school district boundaries. The superintendent is Dr. Kadee Anstadt.

== Schools ==
=== Grades 9-12 ===
- Whitmer Senior High School
- Whitmer Career and Technology Center
- Malcolm-Bain Center

=== Grades 7-8 ===
- Whitmer Middle School

=== Grades K-6 ===
- Greenwood Elementary
- McGregor Elementary
- Meadowvale Elementary
- Monac Elementary
- Shoreland Elementary
- Silver Creek Elementary

== History ==
This school district was originally called Washington Township Schools, when it was first organized in 1840 and all of the property was outside of the Toledo city limits.

Information from local historian Fred Folger indicated that an original one-room was Hopewell, 1876–1917. A new brick, four-room building for Hopewell was built in 1925. Another original one-room school was Oak Grove-Crabb, built in 1900. Jacobi School, located on Matzinger Road near Detroit Avenue, is the only one-room Washington Township schoolhouse still standing, currently part of a car business. At the intersection of Sylvania Avenue and Secor, there was a one-room school named Wamsher which existed from 1894 to 1930. There was an original one-room model school at Trilby which existed 1897-1917 until the new four-room Trilby was completed in 1917. At the northeast corner of Central Avenue and Secor in the early 1900s was the one-room Haughton School. Haughton building was replaced with a four-room school, which was in existence from 1917 to 1939. Walden School, built around 1905, was located at Matziner and Benore. Just northwest of Keen, on Suder Avenue, was a District Eight-Lehman-Hastings-Michigan Avenue one-room school. Also built around that time was Point Place School, located on 131st Street, off of Summit. Around 1914, Prairie Stop Four School was located on Sylvania Avenue, east of Jackman Road. At the corner of Sylvania Avenue and Vermaas was West Toledo Morris Avenue School. Another known building was West Toledo School, located on Lewis Avenue. C. August Klein's Elementary, located on 117th Street in Point Place, was opening in 1927. Edgewater Elementary, also openings in 1927, later became one of Toledo Public's schools.

Many changes to district boundaries, neighborhood expansions and construction occurred. As a result, most of the old buildings described above were demolished, and many new buildings came in to existence.

In the 1950s, kindergarten classes were held in other locations, such as nearby churches. In 1962 kindergartens were included in each of the elementary schools. Around 1962 with the annexing of most of the township into Toledo city, the name became Washington Local School District. Throughout the 1960s and 70s, there were 13 elementary schools, grades K-6, two junior high schools (Washington and Jefferson), both with grades 7 and 8, and Whitmer High School with grade 9-12 district.. Starting in the fall of 1967, the district expanded enrollment had each elementary having students in grades K-7, after which students attended Jefferson Junior High School for grade 8 and Washington Junior High School for grade 9 before attending Whitmer High School. Later, all 13 of these elementary schools funneled into the Jefferson Junior High building, which was 7th grade only. After 7th grade, students went to the Washington building, which was 8th grade. The Whitmer building was 9th-12th grade, with the Vocational facility being completed in the 1970s.

Closings, consolidations and alternative usage for some of the buildings brought the number of elementary schools down to 8. Horace Mann was closed after the 1981/1982 school year. 1st through 3rd were transferred to Trilby elementary where Mr. Burnett was principle.

The original schools in Washington Local that are still used for instruction today are:

- Whitmer High School, Grades 9-12, built in 1958
- Jefferson Junior High (was originally the second Whitmer High School, built in 1927.
- Washington Junior High, built in 1951
- Greenwood Elementary, built in 1958 (originally Northwood, the name was changed due to confusion with Northwood, OH)
- Hiawatha Elementary, built in 1958
- McGregor Elementary, built in 1962
- Meadowvale Elementary, built in 1963
- Monac Elementary, built 1954

As of this writing, two elementary schools (Jackman and Wernert) have been closed, and combined into one new school built on the grounds near the current Jackman building named Silver Creek Elementary. Shoreland Elementary will be replaced with a new building of the same name on the same grounds.

The 8 other original elementary schools were:

- Lincolnshire Elementary, built in 1954 (CLOSED - after 1983 - 1984 school year) (Now the Administration building)
- Westwood Elementary (CLOSED - after 1984 - 1985 school year) (Currently leased to Educational Service Center of Lake West)
- Trilby Elementary (CLOSED - after 2009 - 2010 school year) (Demolished)
- Horace Mann Elementary (CLOSED - after 1978 - 1979 school year) (Demolished)
- Hopewell Elementary (CLOSED - after 1980 - 1981 school year) (Demolished)
- Wernert Elementary (CLOSED - after 2021-2022 school year) (this building was the original Whitmer High School) (DEMOLISHED)
- Jackman Elementary (CLOSED - after 2021-2022 school year) (Demolished and replaced by Silver Creek Elementary)
- Shoreland Elementary (CLOSED - after 2021-2022 school year) (Demolished and replaced by a new building with the same name.)

For more information:

https://washingtonlocalschools.esvbeta.com/History.aspx

At this time, the district intends to construct an additional Junior High school that will accept 6th - 8th graders, either on the former site of Wernert Elementary or Erne Field across Douglas Road from the Wernert Campus. Whitmer High School will also be rebuilt sometime between 2027 and 2029.

For more information:

https://washingtonlocalschools.esvbeta.com/RebuildWLS.aspx
