= Ames Moot Court Competition =

Moot court at Harvard Law School

The Ames Moot Court Competition is the annual upper level moot court competition at Harvard Law School. It is designed and administered by the HLS Board of Student Advisers and has been in existence since 1911, when it was founded by a bequest in honour of the erstwhile dean of the School who had died the year before, James Barr Ames. Cases take place in a hypothetical United States state named Ames.

== Format and history ==
As currently structured, the official competition begins in the fall (usually October or November) of students' 2L year. The Qualifying Round (Q Round) takes place in the fall semester and proceeds in two steps. First, all participating teams, each made up of four participants, submit an Appellant brief. The top 16 scoring teams continue to a round-robin stage where they each write two Appellee briefs—responding to two different Appellant briefs—and then participate in four oral arguments. Each team sends two members to each argument, with every member arguing twice. The four teams with the highest scores advance to the semi-finals in the spring. Each team is then allowed to add two participants who competed in the Q Round, for a total of six people per team. In this round, two members of each team present oral argument, typically before a panel of one federal appellate judge, one district judge, and one state court judge. In the competition's final round, held in the fall of the students' 3L year, the two remaining teams argue a case before a panel that usually consists of one U.S. Supreme Court justice and two judges from the United States courts of appeal. Prizes are awarded for the best brief, best oralist, and best overall team.

The competition originally was organized around the school's now-defunct law clubs. The competition occurs primarily in students' 2L year because the faculty found that, for students who did not finish at the very top of their first year class, "it [was hard] for them to take the same interest in their work, particularly in the work within the law clubs, participation in which depends entirely upon their own volition." Thus, to encourage students to continue working hard, the Ames finalists received prizes of $200 for first place and $100 for second place. After several years of a single-elimination tournament, the format changed to a round-robin that more closely resembles the current qualifying round structure.

The final round competition is one of the most popular events at the Law School each year, especially because a justice from the U.S. Supreme Court usually presides. The Ames Final Round has occasionally been televised on C-SPAN.

Many have found the Ames competition to be a demanding but rewarding experience. Chief Justice Mary Mullarkey of the Colorado Supreme Court, an Ames semi-finalist in her time at Harvard, wrote that "what was most rewarding was the opportunity to work as a team with other students. We could debate, argue, and challenge each other as we analyzed the case and prepared the briefs. The process was much more satisfying than the routine of classroom lectures and solitary examinations. The Ames competition provided a realistic view of what practicing law could be like."

== Winners ==
Previous notable winners include:

- Second Circuit Court of Appeals judge Henry Friendly (1927)
- California Supreme Court Justice Mathew Tobriner (1927)
- Supreme Court Justice Harry Blackmun (1932)
- Professor and author Wallace Clift (1949-Best Brief)
- US District Judge Stanley Brotman (1950)
- Former Delaware governor Pierre S. du Pont, IV (1963)
- US District Judge John G. Koeltl (1970)
- US District Judge Mark A. Goldsmith (1976)
- Businessman and investor Greg Rosenbaum (1976)
- Former member of the California State Legislature Sheila Kuehl (1977)
- Harvard Law School professor Cass Sunstein (1977)
- Former Stanford Law School dean Kathleen Sullivan (1980)
- Governor of Massachusetts Deval Patrick (1981)
- Commissioner of the EEOC Chai Feldblum (1984)
- Cornell law professor Michael C. Dorf (1989)
- Congressman Artur Davis (1992—Best Oralist, not on winning team)
- San Jose Mayor Sam Liccardo (1995)
- Diplomat Bathsheba Crocker (1995)
- CEO of the London Stock Exchange Group David Schwimmer (1996)
- Former assistant to the Solicitor General Kannon Shanmugam (1997)
- Manhattan District Attorney Alvin Bragg (1999)
- Acting Secretary of the Treasury Adam Szubin (1999)
- Former Assistant US Attorney for the Southern District of New York Hagan Scotten (2009)
