= Chris Wormley =

American football player (born 1993)

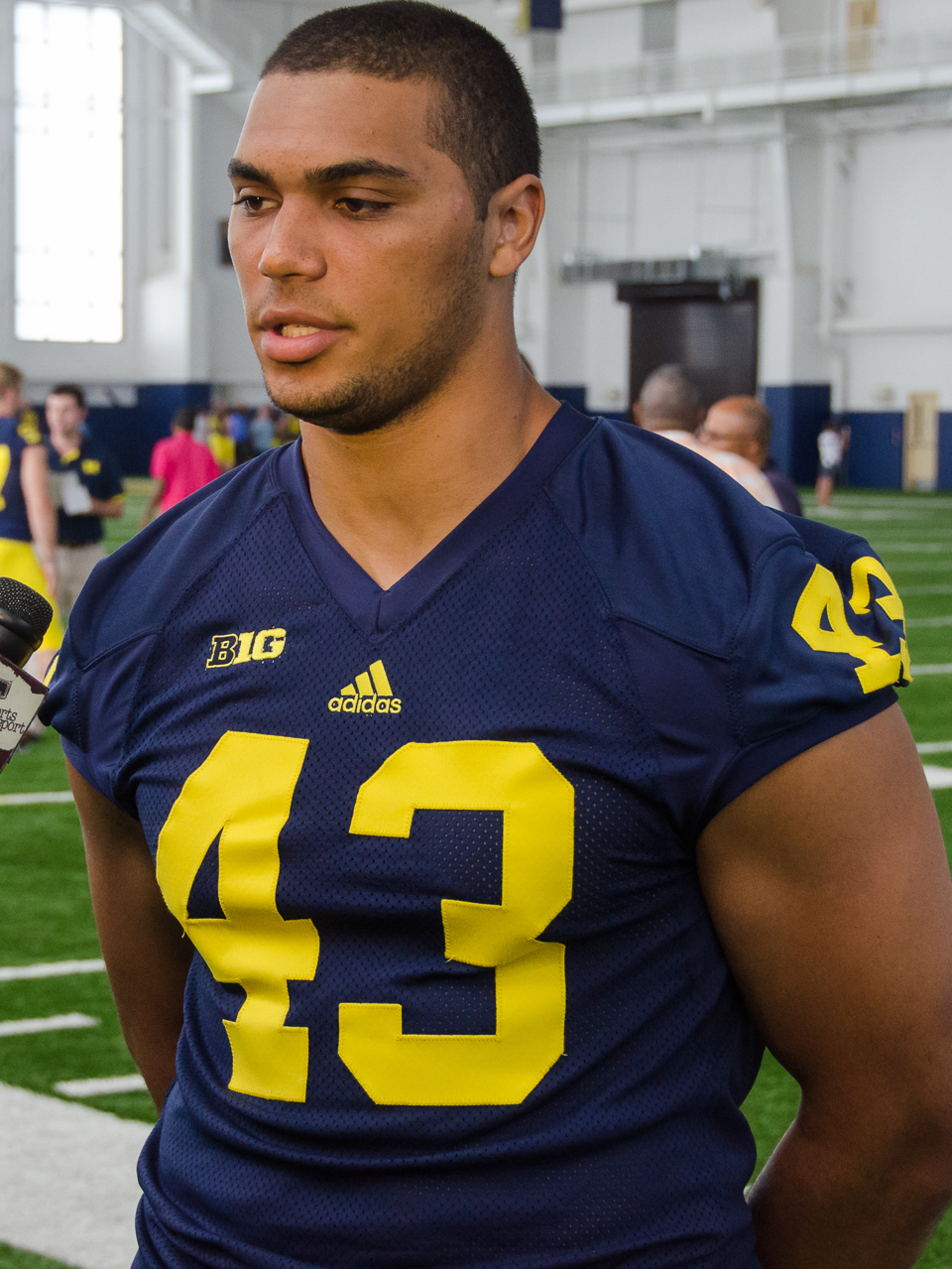
- Wormley while playing for the Michigan Wolverines

Profile
- Position: Defensive end

Personal information
- Born: October 25, 1993 (age 33); Toledo, Ohio, U.S.
- Listed height: 6 ft 5 in (1.96 m)
- Listed weight: 300 lb (136 kg)

Career information
- High school: Whitmer (Toledo)
- College: Michigan (2012–2016)
- NFL draft: 2017: 3rd round, 74th overall pick

Career history
- Baltimore Ravens (2017–2019); Pittsburgh Steelers (2020–2022); Carolina Panthers (2023); Baltimore Ravens (2024); Indianapolis Colts (2025)

Awards and highlights
- Second-team All-American (2016); First-team All-Big Ten (2016)

Career NFL statistics as of 2025
- Total tackles: 157
- Sacks: 12
- Forced fumbles: 2
- Fumble recoveries: 1
- Pass deflections: 10
- Stats at Pro Football Reference

Christopher Keith Wormley (born October 25, 1993) is an American professional football defensive end. He played college football for the Michigan Wolverines, earning All-American honors. Wormley was selected by the Baltimore Ravens in the third round of the 2017 NFL draft. He has also played for the Pittsburgh Steelers and Carolina Panthers.

== Early life ==
Wormley was born in 1993. He attended Whitmer High School in Toledo, Ohio, where he was an all-state football player.

== College career ==
Wormley enrolled at the University of Michigan in 2012. During summer training camp in August 2012, Wormley sustained a torn anterior cruciate ligament, did not play during the 2012 season, and received a medical redshirt. As a redshirt freshman in 2013, he appeared in 13 games as a backup defensive lineman. As a redshirt sophomore in 2014, Wormley appeared in 12 games, six as a starter.

As a redshirt junior in 2015, Wormley appeared in 12 games, including 10 as a starter. He totaled two sacks and eight tackles for loss in the 2015 season.

In 2016, Wormley returned to Michigan as a fifth-year, redshirt senior. In August 2016, Wormley and tight end Jake Butt were selected by a vote of their teammates as the team captains for the 2016 Michigan team. He was also named to the watch lists for the Bronko Nagurski Trophy and Chuck Bednarik Award as the best defensive player in college football. On September 10, 2016, he blocked two field goal attempts in a 51–14 victory over UCF. During the 2016 season, Wormley recorded 39 tackles, with nine tackles-for-loss, and finished second on the team with six sacks.

Following the 2016 season, Wormley was named to the All-Big Ten Conference defensive first-team, by the coaches, and was named a Second-team All-American by Sporting News.

== Professional career ==
Pre-draft measurables
Height	Weight	Arm length	Hand span	40-yard dash	10-yard split	20-yard split	20-yard shuttle	Three-cone drill	Vertical jump	Broad jump	Bench press
6 ft 5 1/8 in (1.96 m)	298 lb (135 kg)	34 1/8 in (0.87 m)	10 1/2 in (0.27 m)	4.86 s	1.62 s	2.75 s	4.59 s	7.08 s	31.5 in (0.80 m)	9 ft 2 in (2.79 m)	23 reps
All values from NFL Combine/Pro Day

=== Baltimore Ravens (first stint) ===
Wormley was drafted by the Baltimore Ravens in the third round, 74th overall, in the 2017 NFL draft. The Ravens had previously obtained the selection used to pick Wormley by trading Timmy Jernigan to the Philadelphia Eagles.

On October 8, 2017, Wormley made his NFL debut, logging 24 snaps and recording his first-career tackle against the Oakland Raiders. The next week Wormley made his first-career start against the Chicago Bears, recording two tackles and his first quarterback hit. He ended his rookie season appearing in 7 games with 2 starts, logging five tackles and a quarterback hit.

On September 9, 2018, Wormley recorded two pass breakups against the Buffalo Bills, the first of his career. The next week he recorded his first tackle for loss against the Cincinnati Bengals. On October 14, Wormley recorded his first sack of his career against the Tennessee Titans. He recorded a career-high 3 tackles against the New Orleans Saints. He ended his sophomore season appearing in all 16 games with 6 starts, recording 16 tackles, two tackles for loss, two quarterback hits, five pass deflections, and a sack.

On November 10, 2019, Wormley recorded his second-career sack against the Cincinnati Bengals and reached career-highs in tackles (4), TFLs (2), and quarterback hits (2).

=== Pittsburgh Steelers ===
On March 20, 2020, Wormley was traded to the Pittsburgh Steelers along with a 2021 seventh-round pick, for the Steelers 2021 fifth-round draft pick. The trade was a rare one between the archrivals, who at that point had made only one other trade since the Ravens moved to Baltimore in 1996. Wormley was placed on injured reserve on October 31, after suffering a knee injury in Week 7. He was activated on November 21. In Week 17 against the Cleveland Browns, Wormley recorded his first sack as a Steeler on Baker Mayfield during the 24–22 loss.

Wormley re-signed with the Steelers on a two-year contract on March 22, 2021.

On December 14, 2022, Wormley was placed on injured reserve after undergoing season–ending surgery to repair a torn ACL.

=== Carolina Panthers ===
On September 11, 2023, Wormley was signed to the Carolina Panthers. He was signed to the active roster on December 15.

=== Baltimore Ravens (second stint) ===
On September 16, 2024, Wormley signed with the Ravens' practice squad. He appeared in two regular season games, recording 4 tackles.

=== Indianapolis Colts ===
On November 18 2025, Wormley signed with the Indianapolis Colts' practice squad. He was activated for the team's November 30, 2025 game against the Houston Texans recording a sack.
