= Ottawa Lake, Michigan =

- Unincorporated community
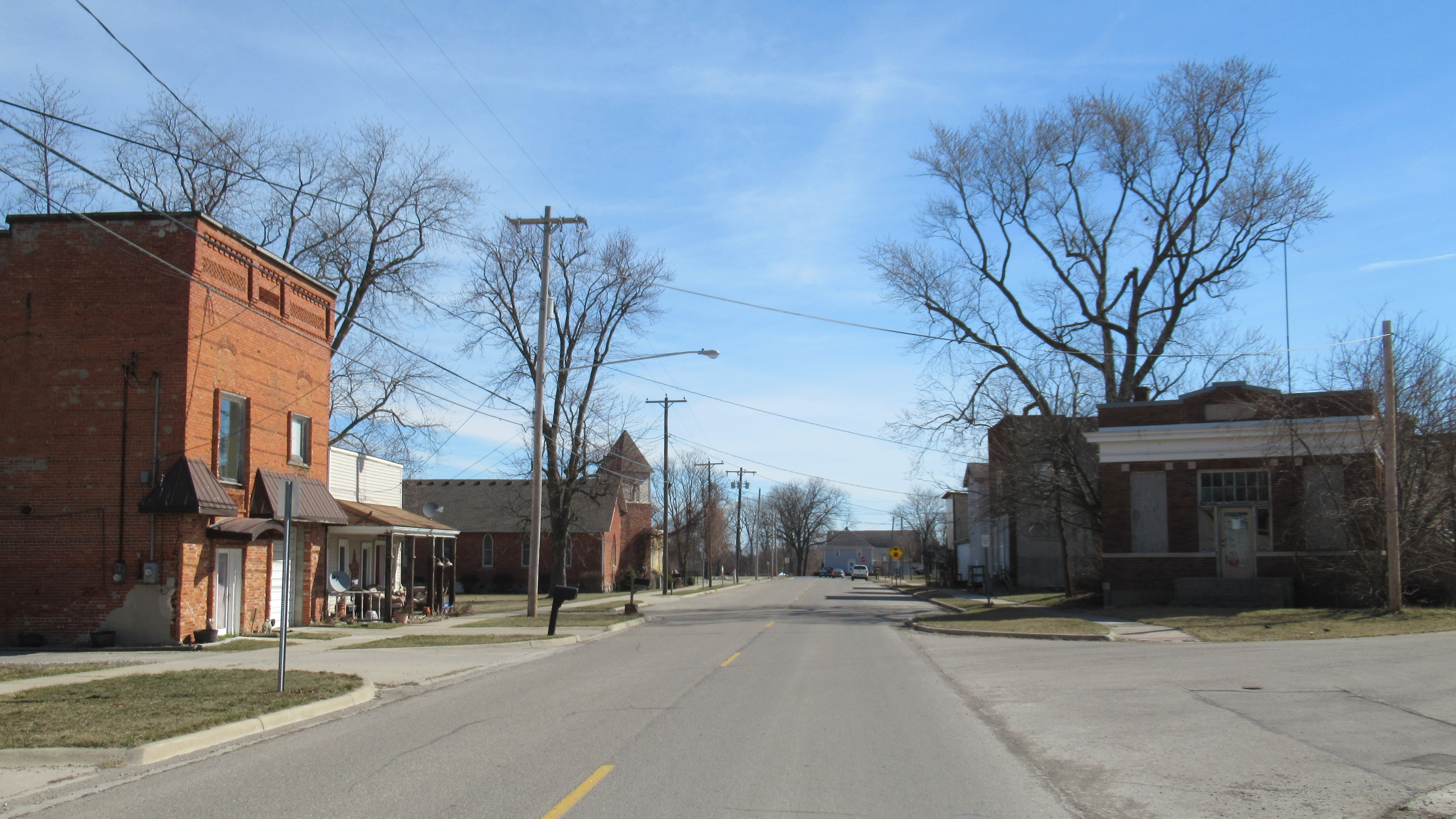
- Looking east along Brown Street

- Location within the state of Michigan Location within the United States
- Coordinates: 41°45′51″N 83°44′51″W
- Country: United States
- State: Michigan
- County: Monroe
- Township: Whiteford
- Settled: 1846
- Elevation: 686 ft (209 m)
- Time zone: UTC-5 (Eastern (EST))
  - Summer (DST): UTC-4 (EDT)
- ZIP code(s): 49267
- Area code: 734

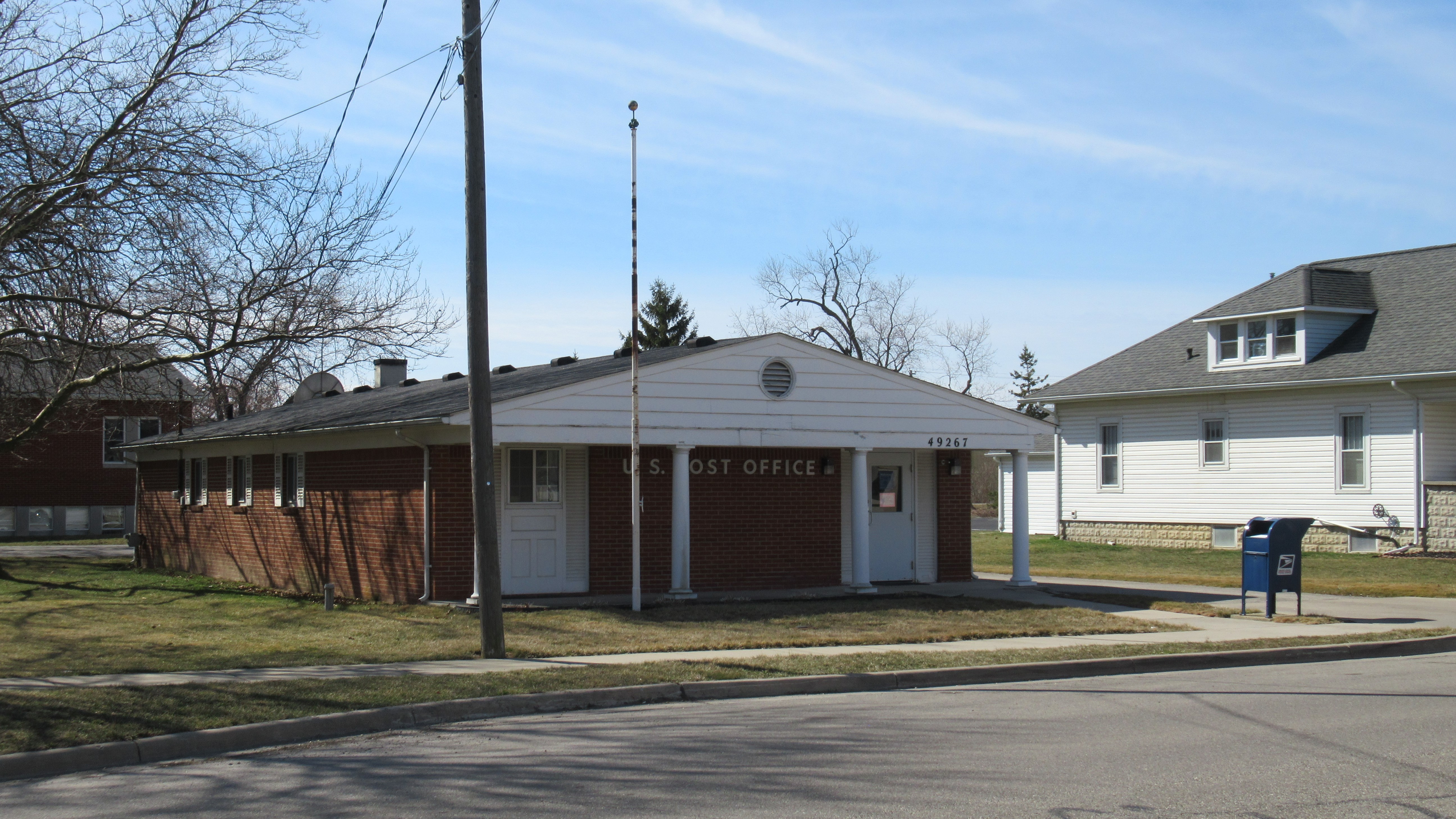
U.S. Post Office in Ottawa Lake

Ottawa Lake is an unincorporated community in Monroe County in the U.S. state of Michigan. The community is located within Whiteford Township. As an unincorporated community, Ottawa Lake has no legally defined boundaries or population statistics of its own but does have its own post office with the 49267 ZIP Code.

== Geography ==
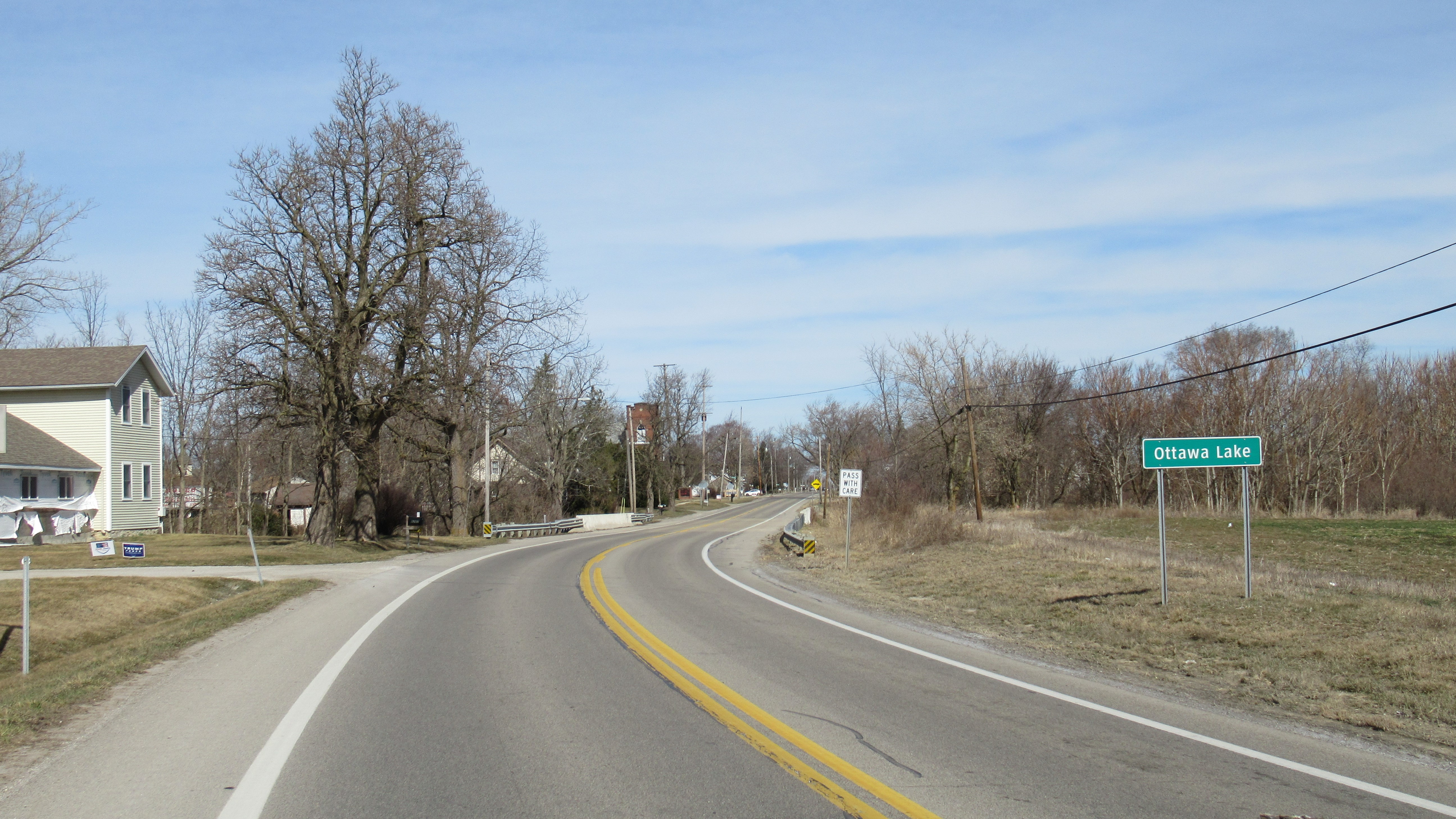
Looking north along Memorial Highway

Ottawa Lake sits at an elevation of 686 feet (209 m) above sea level. The community is centered along Ottawa Lake Road–Brown Street and Memorial Highway (formerly named Old US 223) about 3 miles (4.8 km) west of the concurrency of U.S. Route 23 and U.S. Route 223, with U.S. Route 223 also running independently just north of the community. Ottawa Lake is accessible via exit 3 (Consear Road) from U.S. Route 23, and Memorial Highway runs north to connect to U.S. Route 223.

The community is about 35 miles (56.3 km) southwest of the city of Monroe in the southwest corner of Monroe County near the county line with Lenawee County. The community is about 3 miles (4.8 km) north of the Ohio state border from the city of Sylvania. Other nearby communities include Riga to the west and Whiteford Center and Lambertville to the east.

Ottawa Lake is also the name of a mostly-drained lakebed just north of the community, which provides irrigation and drainage through the Ottawa Lake Outlet stream south through the township.

The community is served by Whiteford Agricultural Schools.

== History ==
The Erie and Kalamazoo Railroad, the first railway in the Michigan Territory, constructed a railway line through the area as early as 1836. It later became part of the Lake Shore and Michigan Southern Railway. The community of Ottawa Lake was settled along the railway around 1846. Ottawa Lake once contained its own train station. It connected the community to Toledo to the southeast and Adrian to the northwest. The station is no longer operational, and the railway lines themselves have been removed and replaced with a roadway called Railway Road, which runs diagonally south–north through the community along the path where the railway once occupied. The Monroe County Historical Society erected a historic marker in Ottawa Lake commemorating the Erie and Kalamazoo Railroad.

Ottawa Lake received its first post office on June 12, 1846 with John Wilder serving as the first postmaster. The post office has continued to remain in operation and is currently located at 8425 Brown Street. The Ottawa Lake post office uses the 49267 ZIP Code, which serves the majority of Whiteford Township and a portion of southeast Riga Township to the west in Lenawee County. The ZIP Code also serves a very small area of Bedford Township to the east. The Toledo Suburban Airport is located in Whiteford Township and also uses the Ottawa Lake ZIP Code.

Ottawa Lake contains a volunteer fire department located in the center of the community 8440 Brown Street across the street from the post office near Memorial Highway.

== Notable people ==
- Dan Abbott, professional baseball player for the Toledo Maumees in the American Association, died in Ottawa Lake
- Nate Holley, inactive professional football player, born in Ottawa Lake
