= Empire Kosher =

Largest kosher meat processor

Empire Kosher Poultry, Inc.
- Type: Subsidiary Brand
- Industry: Food distribution
- Founded: 1938
- Founder: Joseph N. Katz
- Headquarters: Mifflintown, Pennsylvania
- Key people: Rabbi Israel Weiss, VP for Rabbinic Affairs
- Products: Chicken, Turkey, other prepared foods
- Owner: Aterian Investment Partners
- Number of employees: 750
- Website: empirekosher.com

Empire Kosher Poultry, Inc. is the largest producer of kosher poultry in the United States. The company's headquarters, hatchery, and processing facility are located in Mifflintown, Pennsylvania.

== History ==
=== Early years ===
Empire Kosher was founded in 1938 in Liberty, New York, by Joseph N. Katz, an Austrian-Jewish immigrant to the United States. The Katz family, including Joseph's son Murray, owned and ran the business for the first five decades of operation.

In the 1930s and 1940s, the Katz family recruited the rabbis required for the kosher production process from Mandatory Palestine as well as Jewish communities in Europe, and the company initially operated out of a garage in Liberty, New York. (The company's name comes from the nickname for New York State.) In the 1950s, Empire became known as an innovator in kosher food production.

=== Relocation and expansion ===
Early in the 1960s, while still owned by the Katz family, the company relocated to Mifflintown, Pennsylvania, approximately 40 miles outside of Harrisburg, Pennsylvania, where it is still headquartered today. Katz purchased a processing plant in Mifflintown, and expanded production in order to meet the demand provided by the growing Jewish middle class. Empire became the first kosher food company to move into mainstream supermarket distribution.

=== Competition and debt ===
In 1986, a fire destroyed the production line at the Mifflintown plant, and the Katz family invested nearly $20 million to rebuild and modernize the plant. In 1992, Empire was sold to private equity firm Apollo Management, and several years later sold to another private equity firm, J.W. Childs Associates, and the company carried a high debt burden.

=== Investment and growth ===
In 2003, Empire was purchased by a consortium of private investors led by Greg Rosenbaum. The company modernized and expanded its plant and production line, more than doubling production capacity by 2009. Empire currently processes 240,000 chickens and 27,000 turkeys per week, with annual revenue over $100 million, making it the largest U.S. producer of kosher poultry.

Empire's workforce is unionized, and are members of the United Food and Commercial Workers Local 1776. Under its current ownership, Empire has donated kosher food to community food pantries. In 2011, the Metropolitan Council on Jewish Poverty granted Empire's CEO, Greg Rosenbaum, its Humanitarian Award. In addition, Empire has received positive press coverage regarding its animal welfare and environmental standards.

In 2010, Empire acquired the Kosher Valley brand from natural and organic foods producer Hain Celestial Group. In March 2015, Hain Celestial Group announced the acquisition of the remaining approximately 80% that it did not already own of EK Holdings, Inc. and its wholly owned subsidiary, Empire Kosher Poultry, Inc. for a purchase price of $57.6 million, which included net debt that was repaid at closing. Empire was purchased from Hain by Aterian Investment Partners in 2019.

== Production and distribution ==
=== Hatching and growing ===
Empire states that it hatches its own poultry eggs at an on-site hatchery in Mifflintown, and that all of its chickens and turkeys are grown on small family farms within a 90-mile radius of the Mifflintown plant.

Empire claims that its quality control inspectors are "five times stricter than USDA inspectors", and says that its poultry also adheres to the following standards:

- Animal feed is all vegetarian.
- No antibiotics.
- No growth hormones.
- Animals must be traceable to the farm where they were raised.
- Animals are cage-free and free-roaming.
- Empire passes regular third party animal welfare audits, including those conducted by customers such as Whole Foods and Costco.

In addition, Empire offers a line of Organic products. The company recently launched a "Green Kosher" marketing campaign.

=== Kashrut and processing ===
A team of 65 rabbis oversee the kosher slaughter process in Mifflintown. The rabbis live in on-site dormitories during the week, and the plant has its own mikvah and shul. Empire poultry is raised, slaughtered and processed in accordance with Jewish law, and is certified kosher by the Orthodox Union, Rabbi Yechiel Babad (the Tartikover Rav), and Rabbi Aaron Teitelbaum (the Nirbater Rav). Until 20 July 2020, kosher supervision was also provided by K'hal Adath Jeshurun (KAJ), an Orthodox Jewish congregation and synagogue located in the Washington Heights neighborhood of New York City. KAJ withdrew its kosher certification after a disagreement with Empire management.

As part of the kosher production process, salt is used to cleanse blood from the animal. Cook's Illustrated regularly recommends Empire kosher chickens and turkeys in part due to this distinctive taste.

== See also ==
- Impact of the 2019–20 coronavirus pandemic on the meat industry in the United States
