= U.S. Route 223 =

US Highway in Michigan and Ohio

U.S. Route 223
- US 223 highlighted in red, Bus. US 223 highlighted in green

Route information
- Auxiliary route of US 23
- Maintained by ODOT and MDOT
- Length: 46.34 mi (Note: Total mileage is a summation of the state mileages.) (74.58 km)
- Existed: 1930–present

Major junctions
- South end: US 23 / SR 51 / SR 184 in Sylvania, Ohio
- US 23 near Lambertville, Michigan; M-52 in Adrian, Michigan
- North end: US 127 in Woodstock Township, Michigan

Location
- Country: United States
- States: Ohio, Michigan
- Counties: Ohio Lucas; Michigan Monroe, Lenawee

Highway system
- United States Numbered Highway System; List; Special; Divided
- Ohio State Highway System; Interstate; US; State; Scenic
- Michigan State Trunkline Highway System; Interstate; US; State; Byways
← SR 222	Ohio	→ SR 223
← M-222	Michigan	→ M-227
← M-151	M-151	→ M-152

US Route 223 or US Highway 223 (US 223) is a diagonal (northwest–southeast) United States Numbered Highway lying in the states of Michigan and Ohio. The southernmost section is completely concurrent with the US 23 freeway, including all of the Ohio segment. It connects US 23 in the south near Toledo, Ohio, with US 127 south of Jackson, Michigan. The highway passes through farmland in southern Michigan and woodland in the Irish Hills. Including the concurrency on the southern end, US 223 is 46.34 miles (74.58 km) in total length.

The highway designation was created in 1930 out of the southern end of US 127. Three sets of reroutings through Adrian have resulted in the creation of two different business loops through the city. A change proposed in the 1960s and implemented in the 1970s shifted the southern end of US 223 to replace M-151 and then run along the US 23 freeway between Whiteford Township, Michigan, and Sylvania, Ohio. Since the 1980s, US 223 no longer reaches Toledo, instead feeding into the freeway system for the city. Changes proposed and enacted into law in the 1990s would upgrade the highway as an Interstate Highway. Congress has designated this corridor as part of Interstate 73 (I-73), although neither state intends to complete the freeway at this time.

== Route description ==
US 223 starts at an interchange with State Route 51 (SR 51) and SR 184 in Sylvania on the northwest side of the Toledo, Ohio metropolitan area. US 223 runs concurrently with US 23 around two-thirds of a mile (1.0 km) to the Ohio–Michigan state line. The two highways' designations follow the freeway northward through rural farmland. At exit 5, US 223 separates from US 23 and turns west along an extension of St. Anthony Road.

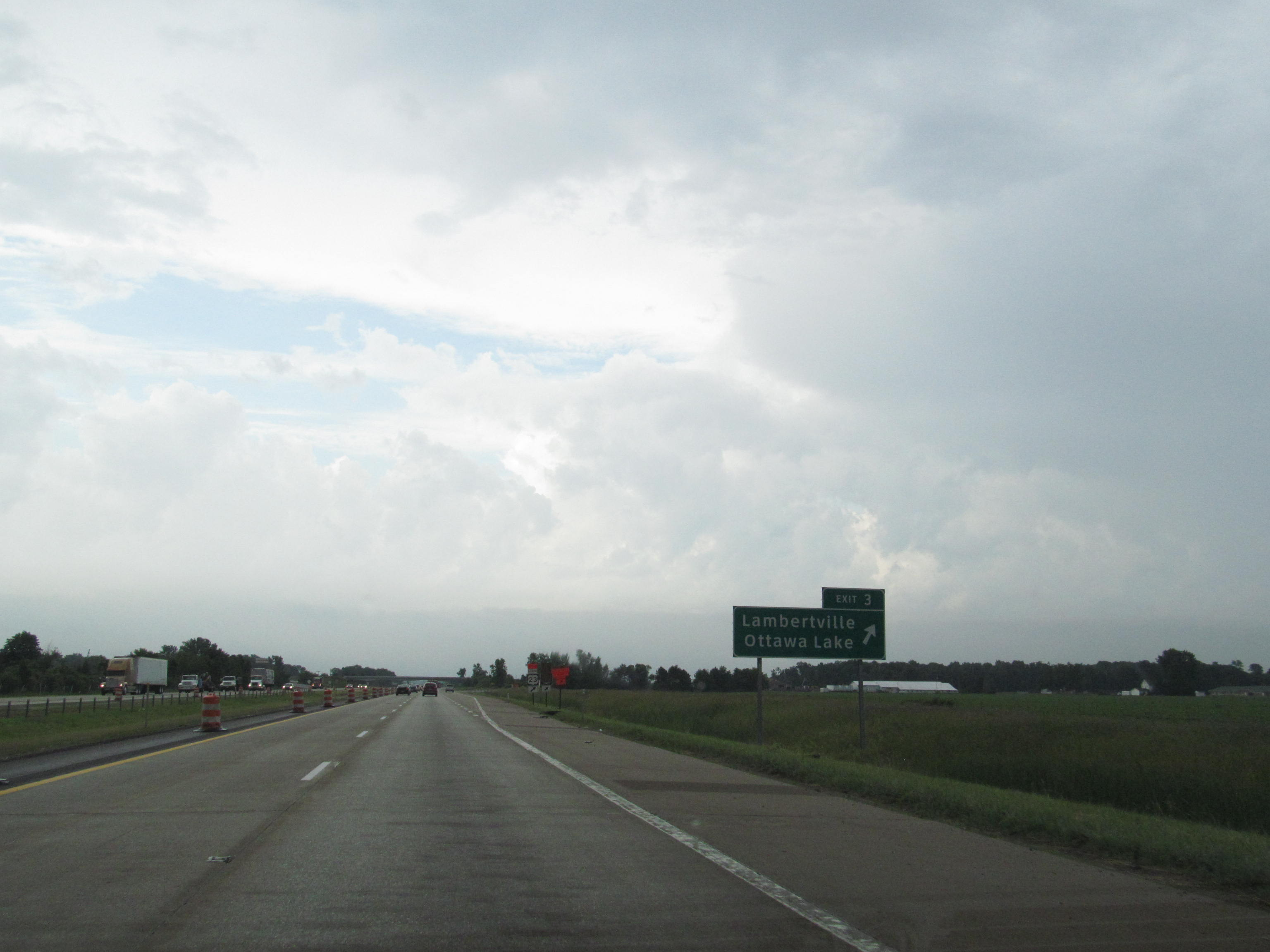
Freeway approaching exit 3 in southern Monroe County

The highway continues westward through the farmland as a two-lane road to the Monroe–Lenawee county line. US 223 meets its former routing and turns northwesterly along Lansing Road, crossing a branch of the Indiana & Ohio Railway. US 223 runs parallel to the Adrian & Blissfield Railroad that branches off southwest of the highway. Both the highway and rail line run northwesterly into Blissfield. The two cross while US 223 runs along Adrian Street through downtown, and the highway makes its first crossing of the River Raisin before leaving downtown. The second crossing is in Palmyra northwest of Blissfield.

US 223 returns to a due west track as it crosses a branch of the Norfolk Southern Railway, and the roadway approaches the outskirts of Adrian. The highway runs along the southern city limits for Adrian as it meets M-52. The only business loop for US 223 runs north of this intersection with M-52 into downtown Adrian while US 223 continues through a secondary business corridor south and west of town. US 223 crosses Beaver Creek and then intersects M-34 on the western city line in a residential section of Adrian. As US 223 crosses fully into the city of Adrian, it continues northwesterly, then turns due west at the intersection where it meets its business loop's western terminus. Outside of town, the highway crosses through more farmland continuing to northwestern Lenawee County.

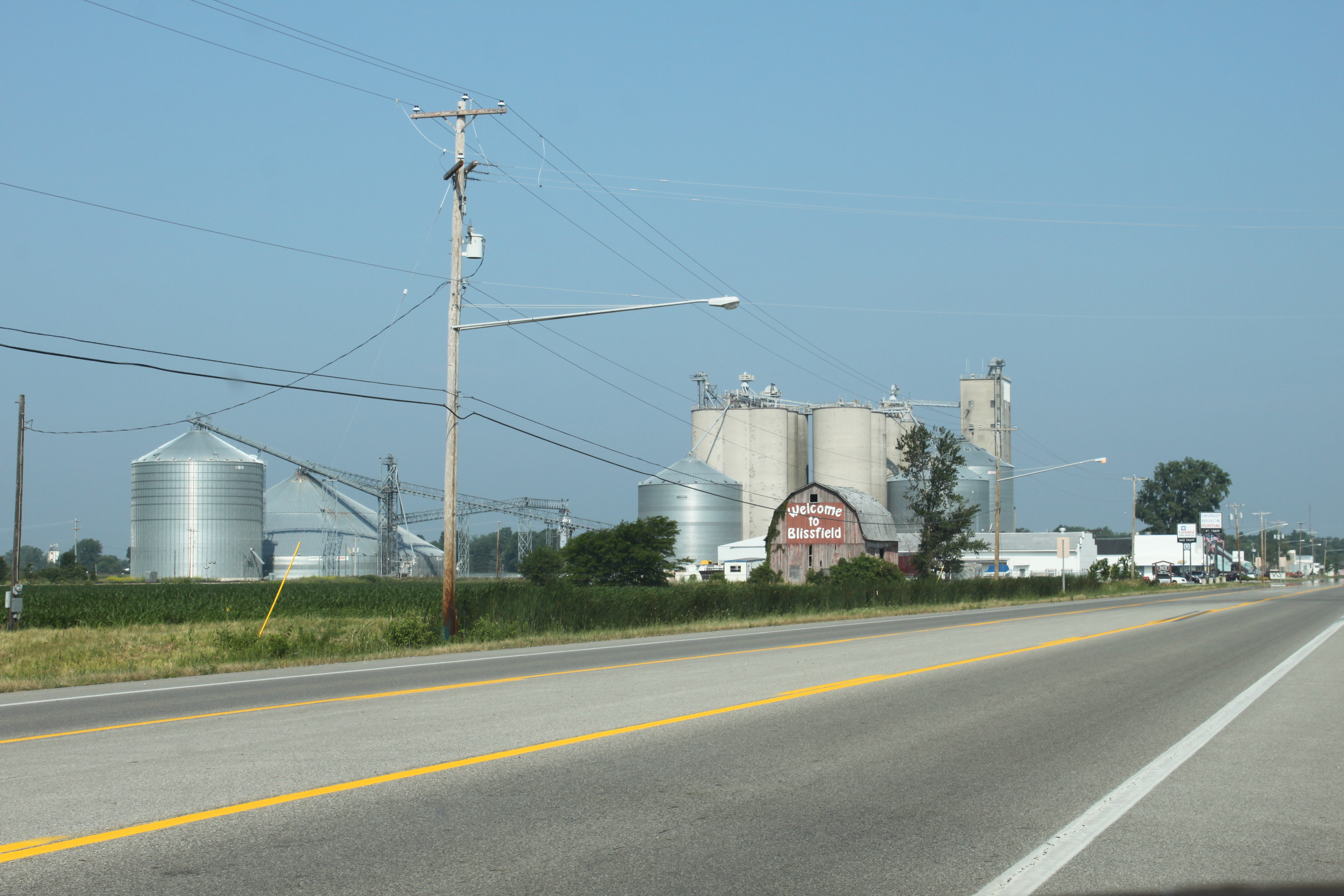
Entering Blissfield

US 223 passes out of flat farmlands into the Irish Hills region as the highway runs northeast of Manitou Beach as the roadway rounds the northern shore of Devils Lake. The Irish Hills region has gently rolling hills that transition to forests from farms. Southeast of Somerset, US 223 meets US 127 and ends. The entire highway in both Ohio and Michigan is listed on the National Highway System, a system of highways important to the nation's economy, defense, and mobility.

== History ==
As early as 1912, the Ohio section of what is now US 223 was shown on maps as SR 54, however the road was not signed with the number at the time. The Michigan section carried two numbers when the signs were erected by July 1, 1919. The segment from Somerset to Adrian was M-80, and the remainder in Michigan was M-34. Ohio signed its highways, including SR 54, by July 1923.

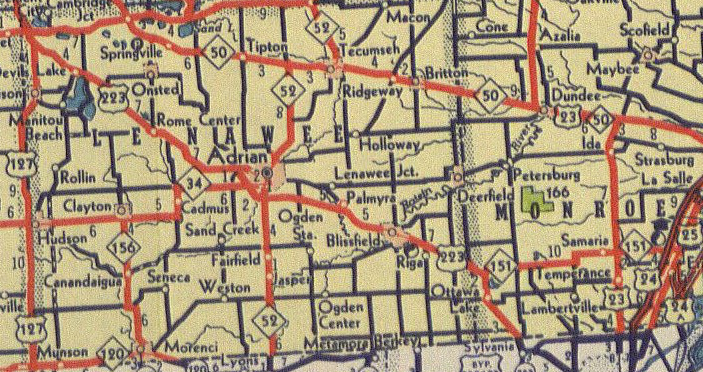
Routing of US 223 and M-151 in Michigan on October 1, 1957

When the United States Numbered Highway System debuted on November 11, 1926, these highways were all used as part of the southern end of US 127, which started in Lansing, Michigan, and ended in Toledo at the time. In 1930, US 127 south of Somerset was rerouted to replace M-14 to the state line and extended to end in Cincinnati, Ohio. The section of US 127 between Somerset and Toledo was then renumbered US 223, making the highway a spur of US 23.

The routing of US 223 was changed through Adrian in 1935, shifting the highway along different streets through town. Another change in 1942 through Adrian led to the creation of the first business loop through the city. This version of the business loop lasted until the main highway was moved a second time in 1956. With this subsequent move, the business loop designation was shifted to its current location.

M-151
- Location: Whiteford Township, Michigan
- Length: 3.715 mi (5.979 km)
- Existed: 1935–1977

Michigan first started converting US 23 into a freeway in 1957. Several years later, the state first proposed a realignment of US 223 in 1965. This change would have rerouted the highway to replace M-151 in southern Monroe County, and use the US 23 freeway to connect to Sylvania, Ohio. The Michigan State Highway Department truncated M-151 in 1965, eliminating the section that ran eastward through Samaria to US 25 south of Monroe. The remainder of the US 223 realignment change was made in 1977 when Michigan shifted its segment of US 223 over M-151 as previously proposed. Instead of running south through Ottawa Lake along Memorial Highway, US 223 continued east to the US 23 freeway and south into Ohio. The former routing has been retained as an unsigned highway.

The last major change occurred when the Ohio Department of Transportation (ODOT) truncated US 223 at exit 234. The city of Toledo and the state proposed the change in late 1985 to simplify travel in the area. The section of US 223 from Sylvania into downtown Toledo was used for an extension of SR 51 when the change was made between 1985 and 1987.

A local regional planning group in Michigan proposed upgrading the section of US 223 through Lenawee County in 1990, citing increased congestion and accidents in the previous five years. The commission also supported upgrades to the highway because it was the main route between the Jackson and Toledo areas. Subsequent upgrades during 2000 added passing lanes near Palmyra and 6.6 miles (10.6 km) of roads were resurfaced.

== Future ==

The original defined alignment of I-73 would have run along I-75 to Detroit. However, Congress amended that definition in 1995 to have a branch along the US 223 corridor to south of Jackson and the US 127 corridor north to I-75 near Grayling, Michigan. From Grayling it would use I-75 to Sault Ste. Marie. Except south of Jackson, where the existing highways are two-lane roads and a section of road north of Lansing where the freeway reverts to a divided highway, this corridor is mostly a rural four-lane freeway. While there are no immediate plans to convert the section of US 127 between St. Johns and Ithaca to freeway, the Michigan Department of Transportation (MDOT) continues to purchase parcels for right-of-way to be used for future upgrades.

MDOT included using the US 223 corridor as one of its three options to build I-73 in 2000. The others included using the US 127 corridor all the way into Ohio with a connection to the Ohio Turnpike or using US 127 south and a new freeway connection to US 223 at Adrian. MDOT abandoned further study of I-73 after June 12, 2001, diverting remaining funding to safety improvement projects along the corridor. The department stated there was a "lack of need" for sections of the proposed freeway, and the project website was closed down in 2002. According to press reports in 2011, a group advocating on behalf of the freeway is working to revive the I-73 project in Michigan. According to an MDOT spokesman, "to my knowledge, we’re not taking that issue up again." The Lenawee County Road Commission is not interested in the freeway, and according to the president of the Adrian Area Chamber of Commerce, "there seems to be little chance of having an I-73 link between Toledo and Jackson built in the foreseeable future."

In 2012, MDOT announced a construction project along the US 23/US 223 freeway in southern Monroe County what would rebuild the northbound lanes of the freeway between exits 1 and 5 in addition to improving the interchange ramps in the area. The interchange between US 223 the freeway at exit 5 will also be modified to contain a pair of roundabouts in a configuration known as a dogbone interchange.

== Major intersections ==
County	Location	mi	km	Exit	Destinations	Notes
Lucas	Sylvania	0.00	0.00	234	US 23 south SR 51 south (Monroe Street) – Sylvania	Southern end of US 23 concurrency; northern terminus of SR 51; exit number follows US 23 and is for SR 51 (also serves SR 184); freeway continues southward as US 23
		0.66 0.000	1.06 0.000	Ohio–Michigan state line		
Monroe	Whiteford Township	1.487	2.393	1	Sterns Road	
Monroe	Whiteford Township	2.980	4.796	3	Ottawa Lake, Lambertville	Connects to Consear Road
Monroe	Whiteford Township	5.098	8.204	5	US 23 north – Ann Arbor	Northern end of US 23 concurrency; northern end of freeway section
Lenawee	Madison Township–Adrian city line	24.923	40.110		Bus. US 223 north / M-52 (Adrian Highway/Main Street) – Chelsea	Southern terminus of Bus. US 223
Lenawee	Madison Township–Adrian city line	26.328	42.371		M-34 (Beecher Street) – Hudson	Grade-separated interchange via Industrial Drive
Lenawee	Adrian	27.676	44.540		Bus. US 223 east (Maumee Street)	Western terminus of Bus. US 223; indirect southbound access from Bus. US 223
Lenawee	Woodstock Township	45.695	73.539		US 127 – Hudson, Jackson	Northern terminus; highway continues as US 127 north
1.000 mi = 1.609 km; 1.000 km = 0.621 mi: Concurrency terminus

== Business loop ==
Business US Highway 223
- Location: Adrian, Michigan
- Length: 3.751 mi (6.037 km)
- Existed: 1956–present

Business US Highway 223 (Bus. US 223) is a business route running through downtown Adrian, Michigan. It is also currently the highest numbered and signed business routing in the state of Michigan. Business Spur I-375 (BS I-375) currently exists but BS I-375 is not signed.

The current routing of Bus. US 223 marks the second time the designation has been used in the Adrian area. The first was created in 1942 when the first bypass of Adrian was constructed. This bypass was built along Cadmus Road at Treat Highway west to M-52 (Adrian Highway). US 223 then ran along M-52 to connect with the previous routing. Bus. US 223 was designated along Church, Center, Beecher and Treat streets, the former routing of US 223 through downtown. This incarnation of Bus. US 223 would survive until March 26, 1956 when another new bypass of Adrian was built. The first Bus. US 223 was deleted to allow the designation to be used on the routing of the first US 223 bypass. This first bypass became the current alignment of Bus. US 223.

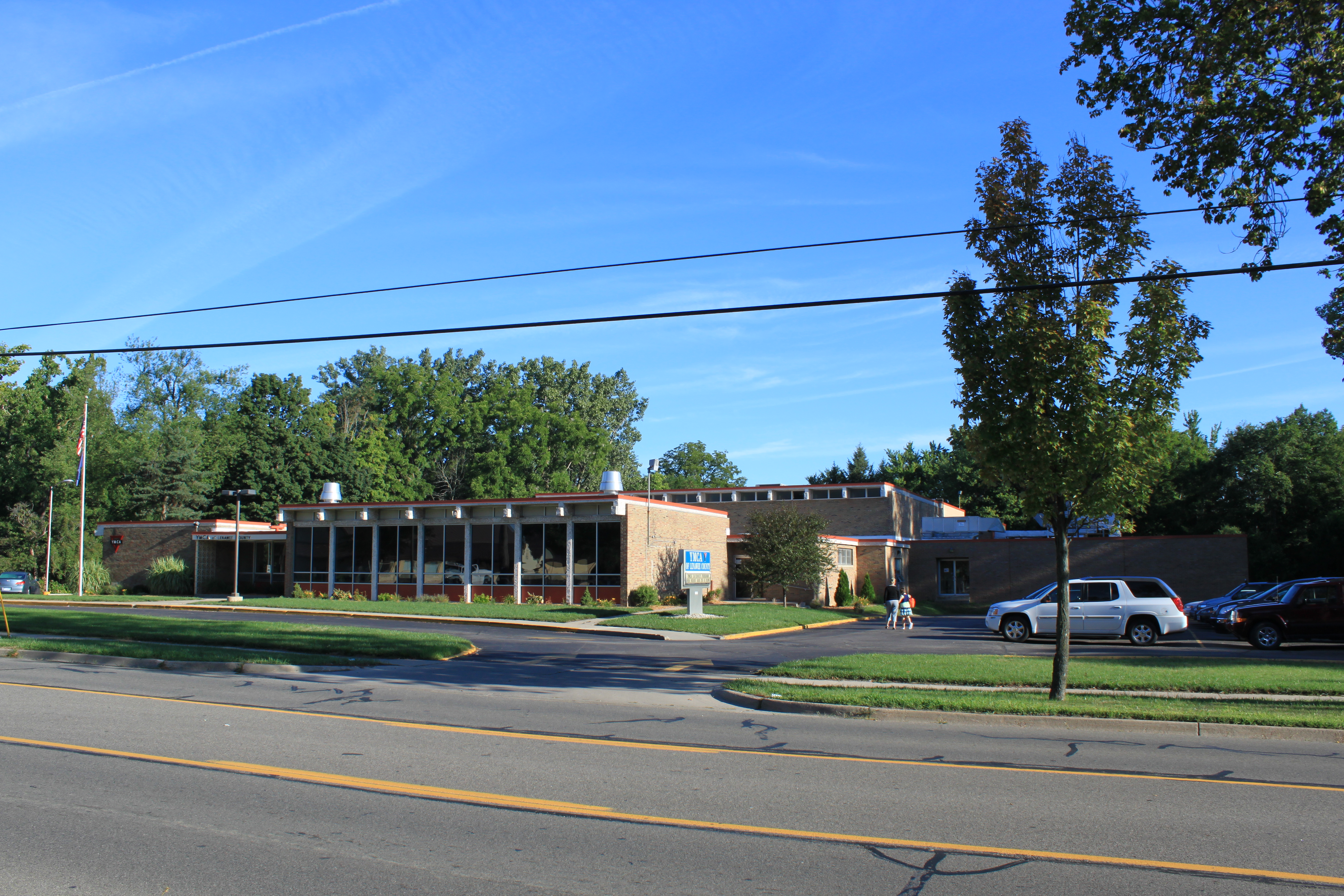
The YMCA on Bus. US 223 west of Downtown Adrian

In the current routing, Bus. US 223 follows M-52 (Main Street) and a former route of US 223 through downtown. The southern terminus is at US 223 at an intersection with M-52 near the southern city line. The business loop runs concurrently with M-52 north into downtown on Main Street, breaking off and running northwesterly along Church Street. From there Bus. US 223 turns westward onto Maumee Street. The route follows Maumee Street to its northern terminus, meeting US 223 again northwest of downtown Adrian.

Major intersections
The entire highway is in Lenawee County.

Location	mi	km	Destinations	Notes
Madison Township–Adrian city line	0.000	0.000	M-52 south (Adrian Highway); US 223 – Toledo, Jackson	Southern end of M-52 concurrency; highway continues into Madison Township as M-52
Adrian	1.004	1.616	M-34 west – Hudson	Eastern terminus of M-34
Adrian	1.649	2.654	M-52 north (East Main Street)	Northern end of M-52 concurrency
Adrian	3.751	6.037	US 223 north	No direct access between Bus. US 223 and US 223 south
1.000 mi = 1.609 km; 1.000 km = 0.621 mi: Concurrency terminus; Incomplete access
