= Riga Township, Michigan =

- Civil township
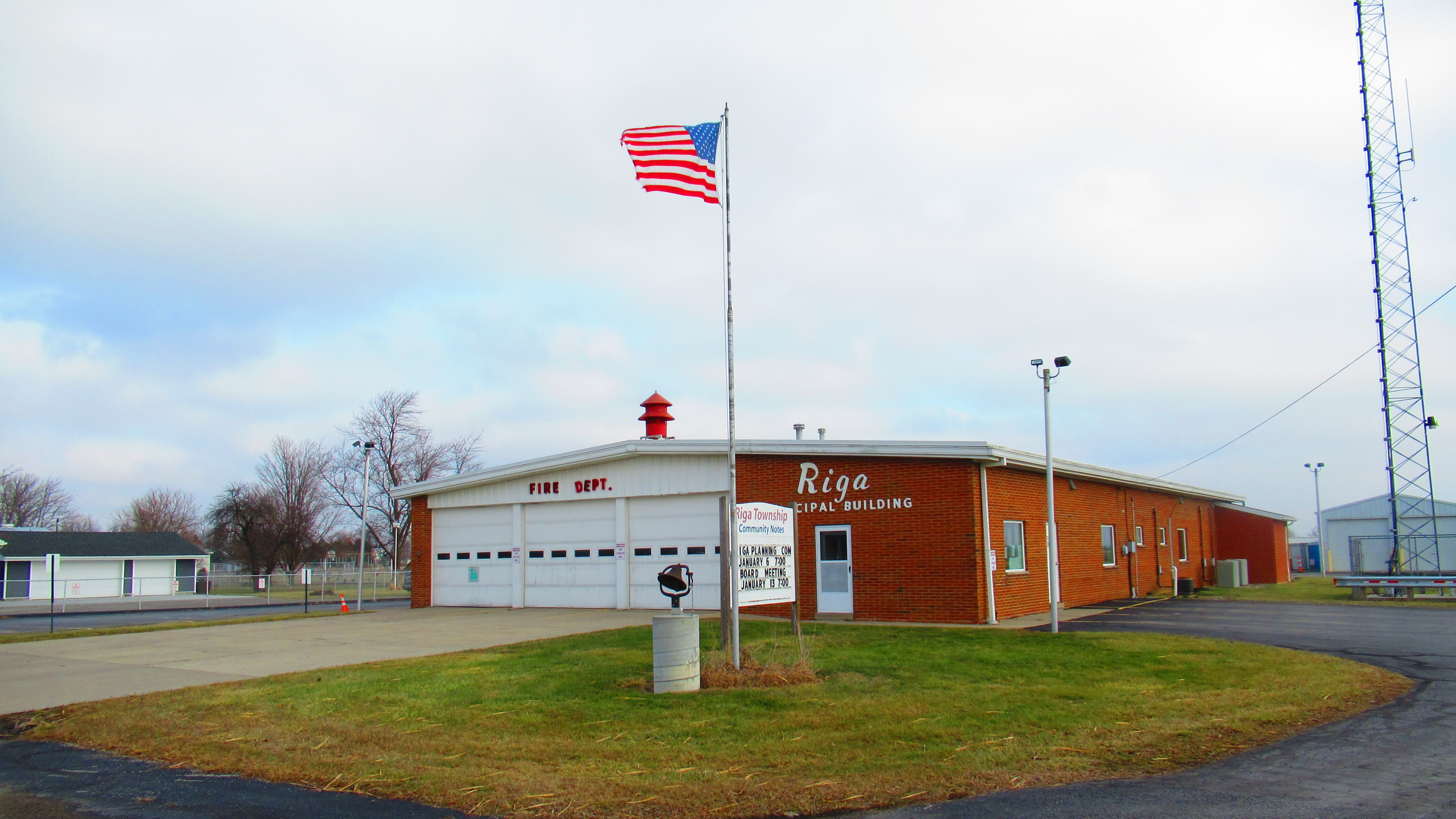
- Riga Township Municipal Building

- Flag

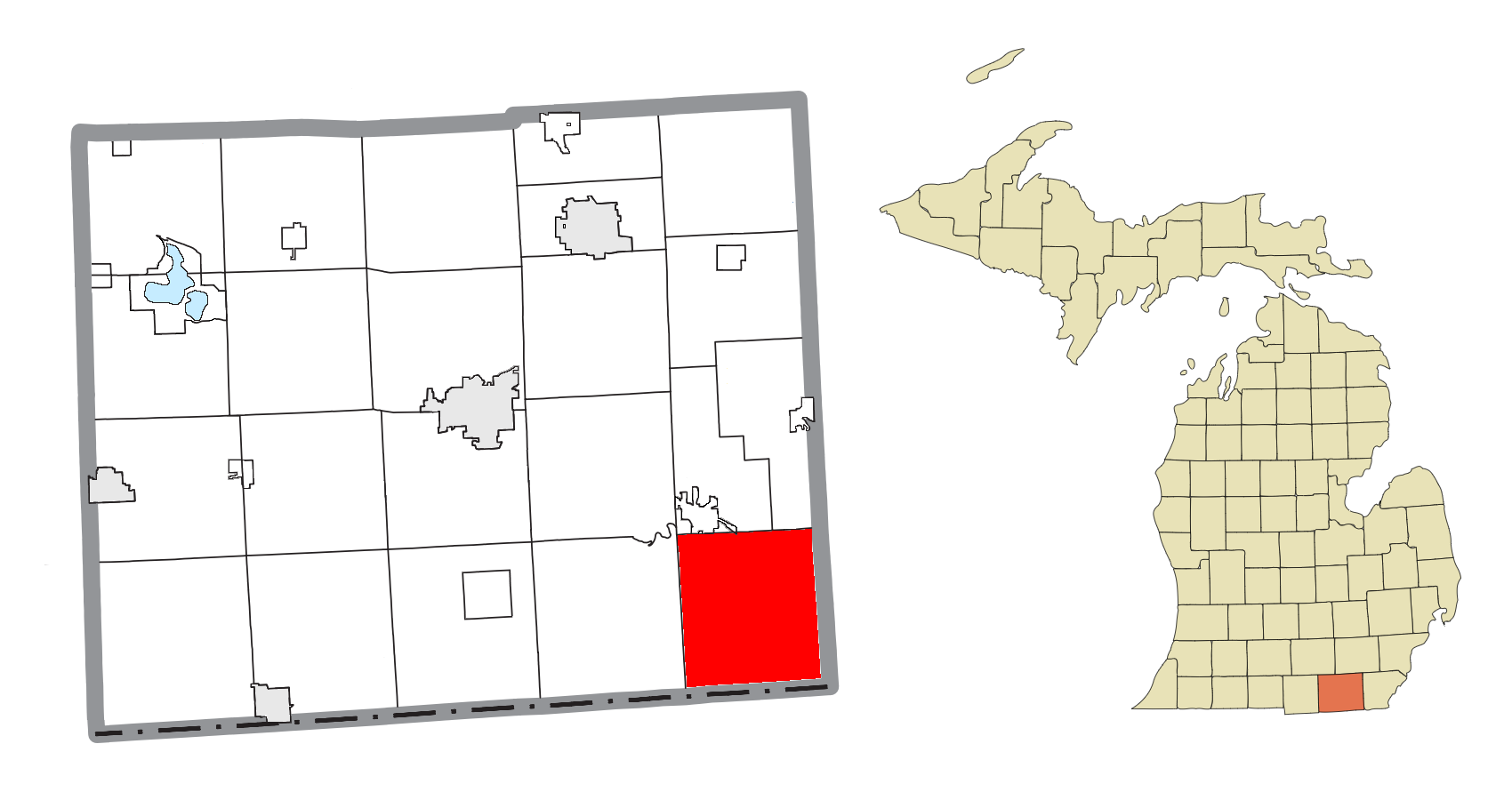
- Location within Lenawee County

- Location within the state of Michigan Riga Township (the United States)
- Coordinates: 41°47′02″N 83°49′09″W
- Country: United States
- State: Michigan
- County: Lenawee

Government
  - Supervisor: Gary Kastel
  - Clerk: Natalie Thompson

Area
  - Total: 40.9 sq mi (105.9 km^{2})
  - Land: 40.9 sq mi (105.9 km^{2})
  - Water: 0 sq mi (0.0 km^{2})
- Elevation: 705 ft (215 m)

Population (2020)
  - Total: 1,286
  - Density: 31.45/sq mi (12.14/km^{2})
- Time zone: UTC-5 (Eastern (EST))
  - Summer (DST): UTC-4 (EDT)
- ZIP code(s): 49228 (Blissfield); 49267 (Ottawa Lake); 49276 (Riga)
- Area code: 517
- FIPS code: 26-68580
- GNIS feature ID: 1626980
- Website: www.rigatownship.com

Riga Township is a civil township of Lenawee County in the U.S. state of Michigan. The population was 1,286 at the 2020 census. The unincorporated community of Riga can be found within the township.

== Geography ==
According to the United States Census Bureau, the township has a total area of 40.9 square miles (106 km^{2}), all land.

== Demographics ==
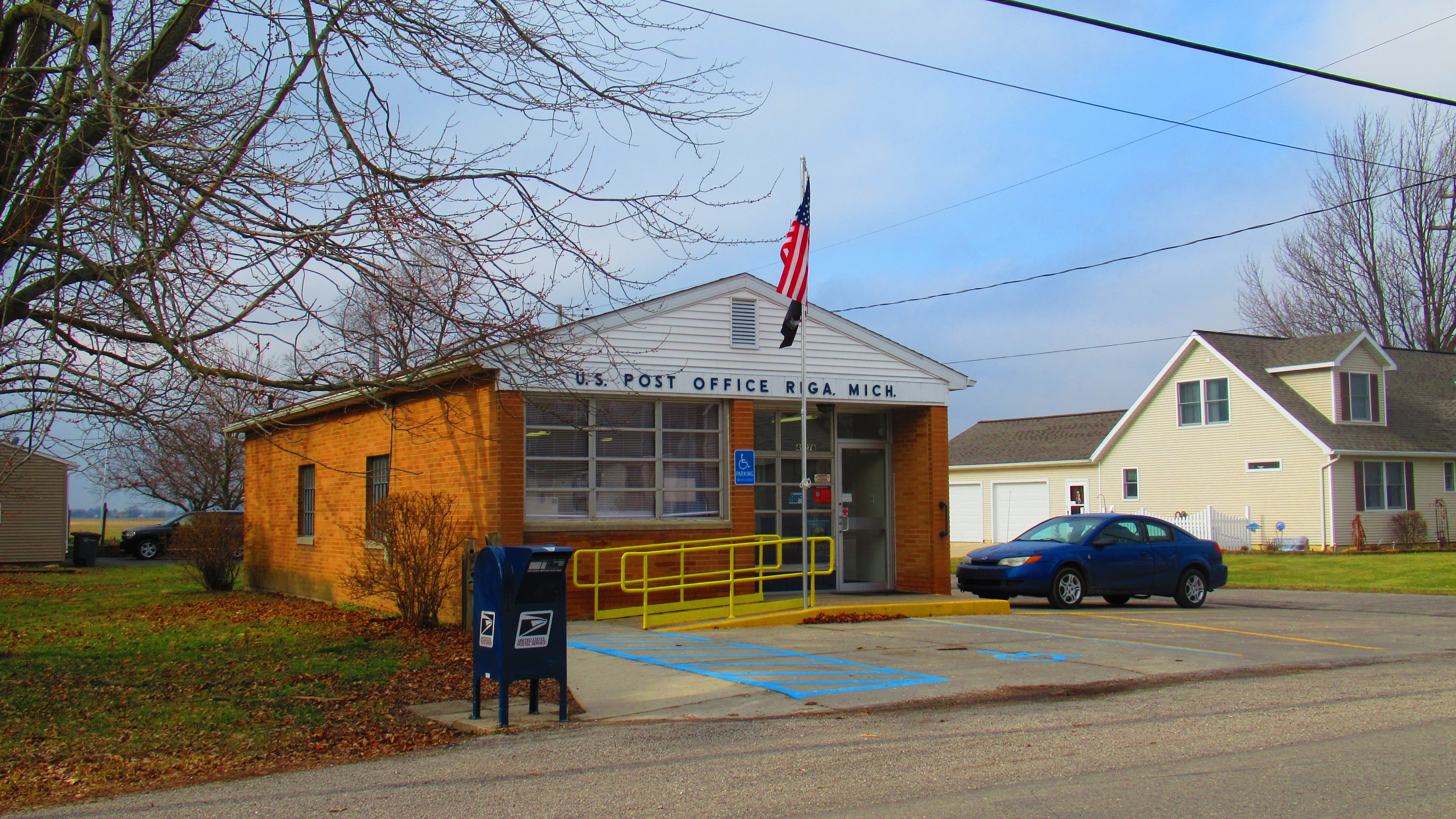
U.S. Post Office in Riga

Historical population
Census	Pop.	Note	%±
1850	208		—
1860	664		219.2%
1870	1,540		131.9%
1880	2,320		50.6%
1890	2,301		−0.8%
1900	2,189		−4.9%
1910	1,944		−11.2%
1920	1,739		−10.5%
1930	1,781		2.4%
1940	1,607		−9.8%
1950	1,646		2.4%
1960	1,863		13.2%
1970	1,675		−10.1%
1980	1,671		−0.2%
1990	1,471		−12.0%
2000	1,439		−2.2%
2010	1,406		−2.3%
2020	1,286		−8.5%

As of the census of 2000, there were 1,439 people, 514 households, and 404 families residing in the township. The population density was 35.2 inhabitants per square mile (13.6/km^{2}). There were 543 housing units at an average density of 13.3 per square mile (5.1/km^{2}). The racial makeup of the township was 97.43% White, 0.07% African American, 0.14% Asian, 1.39% from other races, and 0.97% from two or more races. Hispanic or Latino of any race were 4.45% of the population.

There were 514 households, out of which 34.6% had children under the age of 18 living with them, 68.7% were married couples living together, 5.4% had a female householder with no husband present, and 21.4% were non-families. 19.5% of all households were made up of individuals, and 9.9% had someone living alone who was 65 years of age or older. The average household size was 2.75 and the average family size was 3.17.

In the township the population was spread out, with 27.2% under the age of 18, 6.9% from 18 to 24, 27.1% from 25 to 44, 24.7% from 45 to 64, and 14.0% who were 65 years of age or older. The median age was 39 years. For every 100 females there were 107.9 males. For every 100 females age 18 and over, there were 101.2 males.

The median income for a household in the township was $50,368, and the median income for a family was $57,614. Males had a median income of $39,226 versus $26,667 for females. The per capita income for the township was $20,968. About 4.4% of families and 5.2% of the population were below the poverty line, including 3.3% of those under age 18 and 6.3% of those age 65 or over.
