= Goose Creek (River Raisin) =

Waterway in Michigan, United States, tributary of the River Raisin

- Goose Creek

Location
- Country: United States
- State: Michigan
- Cities: Brooklyn, Cement City, Somerset Center

Physical characteristics
- Source
  - location: Somerset Township, Michigan
  - coordinates: 42°03′32″N 84°22′15″W
- Mouth: River Raisin
  - location: Columbia Township, Michigan
  - coordinates: 42°06′52″N 84°14′51″W
- Length: 12 mi (19 km)
- Basin size: 40 mi^{2} (100 km^{2})

Goose Creek is a small stream in Hillsdale, Jackson and Lenawee counties in the U.S. state of Michigan. It is a tributary of the River Raisin. The headwaters form in Somerset Township in northeast Hillsdale County flowing northeast to join the River Raisin just north of the village of Brooklyn. The total length of the creek is approximately 12 miles (19 km). The Goose Greek subbasin covers an area of 40 mi^{2} (100 km^{2}) with 44% used for agriculture and 38% forest, wetlands, and grasslands. Only about 12% of the watershed is made up of urban development. Of all the subbasins within the River Raisin watershed, Goose Creek has maintained the largest share of wetlands and maintains the lowest levels of pollutants.

== Course ==
Goose Creek is formed in a marshy area of Somerset Township just south of the unincorporated community of Somerset Center within a short distance of the headwaters of the Grand River. From Somerset Center Goose Creek flows in an easterly direction through Lake Somerset, Goose Lake and Little Goose Lake. The village of Cement City is located along the stream just north of Little Goose Lake. Beyond Cement City, the creek turns north running into Lake Columbia. North of the lake, Goose Creek turns east again, traveling 4 mi (6.4 km) before merging with the River Raisin north of Brooklyn.

== Lakes ==
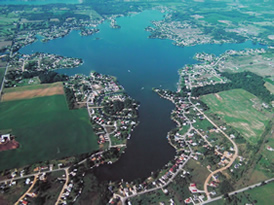
Lake Columbia is the largest lake within the Goose Creek watershed.

Goose Creek drains nine natural and man-made lakes:

- Blood Lake: (42°02′17″N 084°25′02″W)
- Clark Lake: (42°07′14″N 084°19′35″W)
- Goose Lake: (42°03′26″N 084°20′14″W)
- Lake Columbia: (42°05′34″N 084°18′04″W)
- Lake Somerset: (42°03′22″N 084°22′46″W)
- Little Goose Lake: (42°03′38″N 084°19′40″W)
- Lombard Lake: (42°01′47″N 084°23′58″W)
- Moon Lake: (42°02′23″N 084°24′42″W)
- Silver Lake: (42°02′38″N 084°18′26″W)

== See also ==
- Goose Creek Grasslands
- List of rivers of Michigan
