= Lake Columbia =

Reservoir in southern Michigan, U.S.

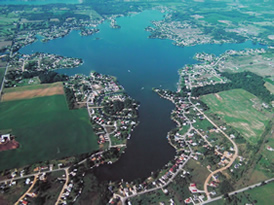

- Location within the state of Michigan Lake Columbia (the United States)
- Location: Jackson County, Michigan
- Coordinates: 42°05′34″N 84°18′04″W
- Type: Man made
- Primary inflows: Goose Creek
- Primary outflows: Goose Creek
- Basin countries: United States
- Max. length: 2.25 mi (3.6 km)
- Max. width: 1.7 mi (2.7 km)
- Surface area: 840 acres (3 km^{2})
- Average depth: 18 ft (5.5 m)
- Max. depth: 25 ft (7.6 m)
- Residence time: 47 years
- Shore length^{1}: 14 mi (23 km)
- Surface elevation: 988 ft (301 m)
- Islands: 2
- ^{1} Shore length is not a well-defined measure.

Lake Columbia is a man-made lake in Columbia Township in southern Jackson County in the U.S. state of Michigan. Originally formed as a mill pond in 1836, it was expanded to 840 acres (3.4 km^{2}) in 1961. At its greatest extent, the lake is 2 and 1/4 miles long and 1 and 3/4 miles wide. It has approximately 14 miles (23 km) of shoreline and the water source to the lake is Goose Creek. The lake has an average depth of 18 feet (5.5 m). Lake Columbia is located 2 miles (3.2 km) west of Brooklyn, Michigan. The latitude for the lake is 42.0928 and the longitude is -84.3011 with an elevation of 988 ft (301 m) above sea level.

Lake Columbia is one of the many lakes in Jackson County that is entirely private. Yearly membership dues in the Lake Columbia Property Owners Association are required by residents of the lake. The lake has a total of 16 private parks. It also has 14 named shores where residents reside. It is a boaters and fishers paradise for local residents of the lake. Lake Columbia is stocked annually with Walleye or Bluegill fish. The fish population continues to grow in Lake Columbia every year.

== Hydrology ==
Goose Creek

Lake Columbia has a primary inflow from Goose Creek and a primary outflow from Goose Creek. Goose Creek mainly flows from west to east and flows into the Raisin River. The Raisin River connects Clark Lake, Vineyard Lake, Norvell Lake and Lake Columbia together by way of Goose Creek also. The drainage area of Lake Columbia is 25,000 Sq. Acres which drains into Jackson County and Hillsdale County, Michigan.

== Natural history ==
The natural wildlife that surround and inhabit Lake Columbia are White Tail Deer, Walleye fish, Bluegill fish, Red Foxes, and Common Loons.

== History ==
=== Prior to 1960 ===
In 1835, John H. and Broadhead Du Bois settled along Goose Creek about 2.4 mi (3.9 km) west of Brooklyn with the intentions of using the small stream to power a set of mills. By 1836, with the dam completed and the mills in operation, the small village of Jefferson was platted. Soon after, a post office was opened and the name was changed to Columbia, as the name Jefferson had already been taken. The original village was located near the intersection of Jefferson Rd and Hewitt Rd, a portion of which was later rerouted when the lake was expanded.

=== 1960 to 1999 ===
In September 1960, after an intensive study by American Central Corporation of Lansing, Michigan, the people in the Lake Columbia area, which was then mostly farmland, were contacted and their farms purchased. The company was looking to sell attractive land around a private lake. Construction started in July 1961 on the earthen L-shaped dam that now stops the flow of Goose Creek. The dam is 950 ft (290 m) long and 35 ft (11 m) high with the head of water at 28 ft (8.5 m). It has a 225 ft (69 m) long spillway made of 2,000 cubic yards of concrete and 200,000 pounds of reinforced steel. The mouth of the spillway is 50 ft (15 m) in diameter. By early Autumn, the dam was completed and attention shifted to clearing the wooded portions of the basin. Flooding commenced on November 10, 1961 culminating in the 840 acres (3.4 km^{2}) of water that make up the modern Lake Columbia.

=== 2000 to present ===
Currently the association boasts approximately than 1,545 members. There are more than 700 lakefront homes, and nearly 650 more near the lake which are still considered part of the Lake Columbia Association. Homes around the lake range in price from $50,000 to over $1 million. The privacy of Lake Columbia is kept up through annual membership dues required every year. As of 2024, the membership dues are $437 for the first lot owned, and $40 for each additional lot.

Each year Lake Columbia offers many events around and on the lake. There are community-oriented events year-round, including fishing tournaments, an annual community-wide garage sale, a golf league, block parties, annual LCPOA picnic, Light Up the Night Weekend, outdoor movie at a park, a rotation of food trucks at the parks throughout the summer, and "trunk-or-treat" at Halloween. Wintertime activities include snowmobiling, ice hockey for kids, ice skating and ice fishing.

Lake Columbia also has one of the most spectacular Fourth of July fireworks displays around Jackson County. It is set up through the Lake Columbia Property Owners Association, and is funded through private donations and the LCPOA.

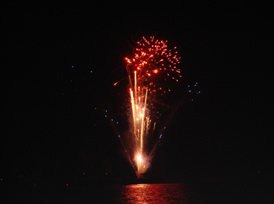
Lake Columbia fireworks display on the 4th of July

== Parks around Lake Columbia ==
Private parks located around Lake Columbia:

- Archwood - Located off Archwood Circle (off Somerset Dr.)
- Bedford, East - Located off Bedford Dr.
- Bedford, West - Located off Bedford Dr.
- Castlewood - Located off Castlewood Dr.(off Wesch Rd.)
- Claremont - Located off Claremont Circle
- Donald - Located off Claremont Circle
- Grand Pointe - Located off Grand Pointe Dr.
- Hawthorne - Located at the end of Hawthorne / Waverly Ct
- Hilltop - Located at end of Hilltop Ct.(off Nottingham)
- Karen Court - Located off Somerset Dr.
- Kelley - Located off Kelley Rd.
- Nottingham - Located at the end of Nottingham
- Princess - Located off Princess Dr.- across the channel from Archwood Park (off Somerset Dr)
- Riviera - Located off Riviera Dr.(off Kelly Rd.)
- Somerset - Located off Somerset Dr.(off Hayes Rd.)
- Southern Shores - Located off Southern Shores Dr

== Local towns and areas ==
- Brooklyn (located east 1.7 miles (2.7 km)) Population (2000) 1,176
- Cement City (located southwest 0.8 miles (1.3 km)) Population (2000) 452
- Clark Lake (Jackson County, Michigan) - located north 1.4 miles (2.3 km)
- Jackson (located north approximately 12.9 miles (20.8 km)) Population (2000) City: 36,316 - Metro Area: 163,629
- Napoleon (located north east 4.8 miles (7.7 km)) Population (2000) 1,254

== Local points of interest ==
=== Golf Courses ===
Golf Courses, parks and many other recreational activities surround the lake and provide a person with things to do year round. Lake Columbia is located closely to the Irish Hills, Michigan International Speedway and the downtown area of Brooklyn. There are over 14 different challenging golf courses within 20 miles (32 km) of Lake Columbia.

The Grande	Clark Lake	Green Valley	Hills' Heart of the Lakes	Cascades
18 Holes	27 Holes	18 Holes	18 Holes	18 Holes
7,157 yards (6,544 m)	7,000 + Yards	6,035 yards (5,518 m)	5,472 yards (5,004 m)	6,551 yards (5,990 m)
Par 72	Par 72	Par 70	Par 69	Par 72

=== State and local parks ===
- Clark Lake Park
- Vineyard Lake County Park
- Walter J. Hayes State Park
- Cambridge Junction Historic St. Park

=== Points of interest ===
- Michigan International Speedway
- Hidden Lake Gardens
- Irish Hills
