= Clark Lake (Jackson County, Michigan) =

Lake in Michigan, United States

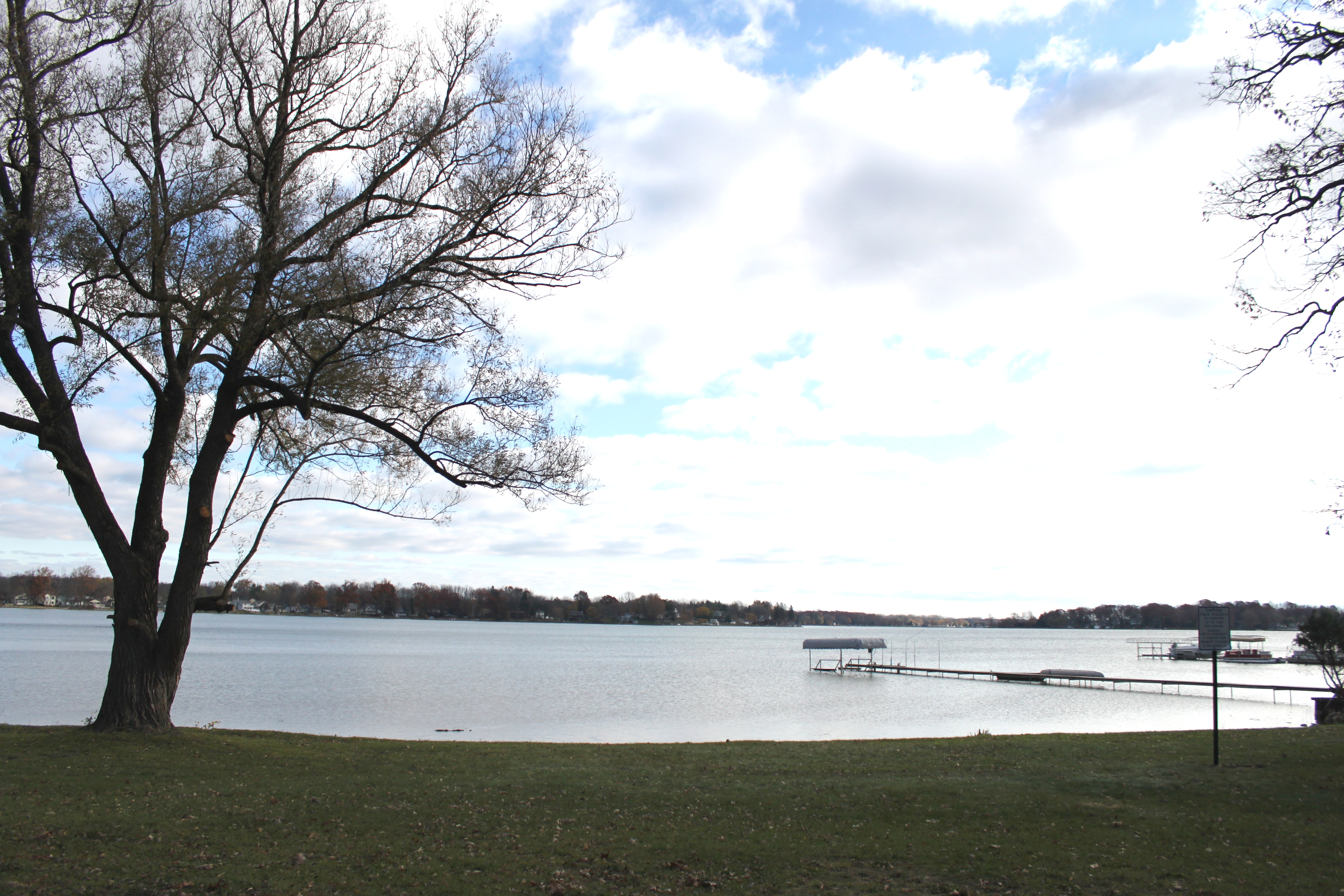
- Clark Lake viewed from Columbia Township Park

- Location within Michigan
- Location: Columbia Township, Jackson County, Michigan
- Coordinates: 42°07′14″N 084°19′35″W
- Basin countries: United States
- Surface elevation: 968 ft (295 m)

Clark Lake is a small lake in Columbia Township in southern Jackson County in the U.S. state of Michigan.

== Local towns and areas ==
- Brooklyn (located east 2.9 miles (4.7 km)) Population (2000) 1,176
- Cement City (located south 3.2 miles (5.1 km)) Population (2000) 452
- Lake Columbia - located South 1.4 miles (2.3 km)
- Jackson (located north approximately 8.1 miles (13.0 km)) Population (2000) City: 36,316 - Metro Area: 163,629
- Napoleon (located north east 4.5 miles (7.2 km)) Population (2000) 1,254

== Local points of interest ==
=== Golf Courses ===
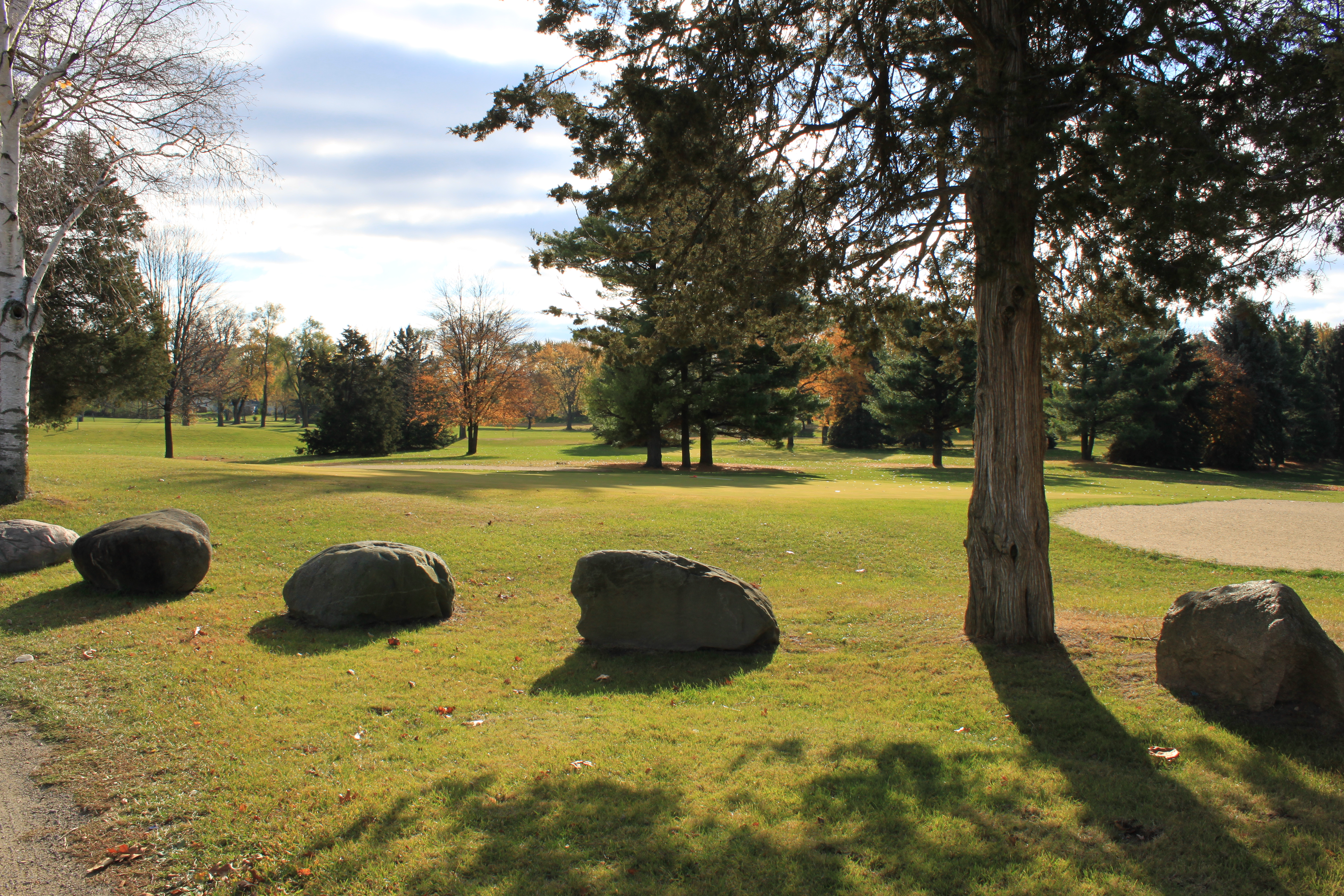
Clark Lake Golf Course

Golf Courses, parks and many other recreational activities surround the lake and provide a person with things to do year round. Clark Lake is located near the Irish Hills, Michigan International Speedway and the downtown area of Brooklyn. There are over 14 different challenging golf courses within 20 miles (32 km) of Clark Lake.

The Grande	Clark Lake	Green Valley	Hills' Heart of the Lakes	Cascades
18 Holes	27 Holes	18 Holes	18 Holes	18 Holes
7,157 yards (6,544 m)	7,000 yards (6,400 m)	6,035 yards (5,518 m)	5,472 yards (5,004 m)	6,551 yards (5,990 m)
Par 72	Par 72	Par 70	Par 69	Par 72

=== State and local parks ===
- Vineyard Lake County Park
- Walter J. Hayes State Park
- Cambridge Junction Historic St. Park

=== Points of interest ===
- Michigan International Speedway
- Hidden Lake Gardens
- Irish Hills

== See also ==
- List of lakes in Michigan
