= HLG =

HLG may refer to:

- Hall Green railway station, in England
- Hannibal–LaGrange University, in Missouri, US
- Helene-Lange-Gymnasium, a school in Hamburg, Germany
- Hidden Lake Gardens, a botanical garden in Michigan, US
- Hip Land Group, a Japanese entertainment conglomerate
- Hong Leong Group, a Malaysian conglomerate
- Hybrid log–gamma, of high-dynamic-range (HDR) display
- Wheeling Ohio County Airport, in West Virginia, US
