= Petersburg, Michigan =

- City
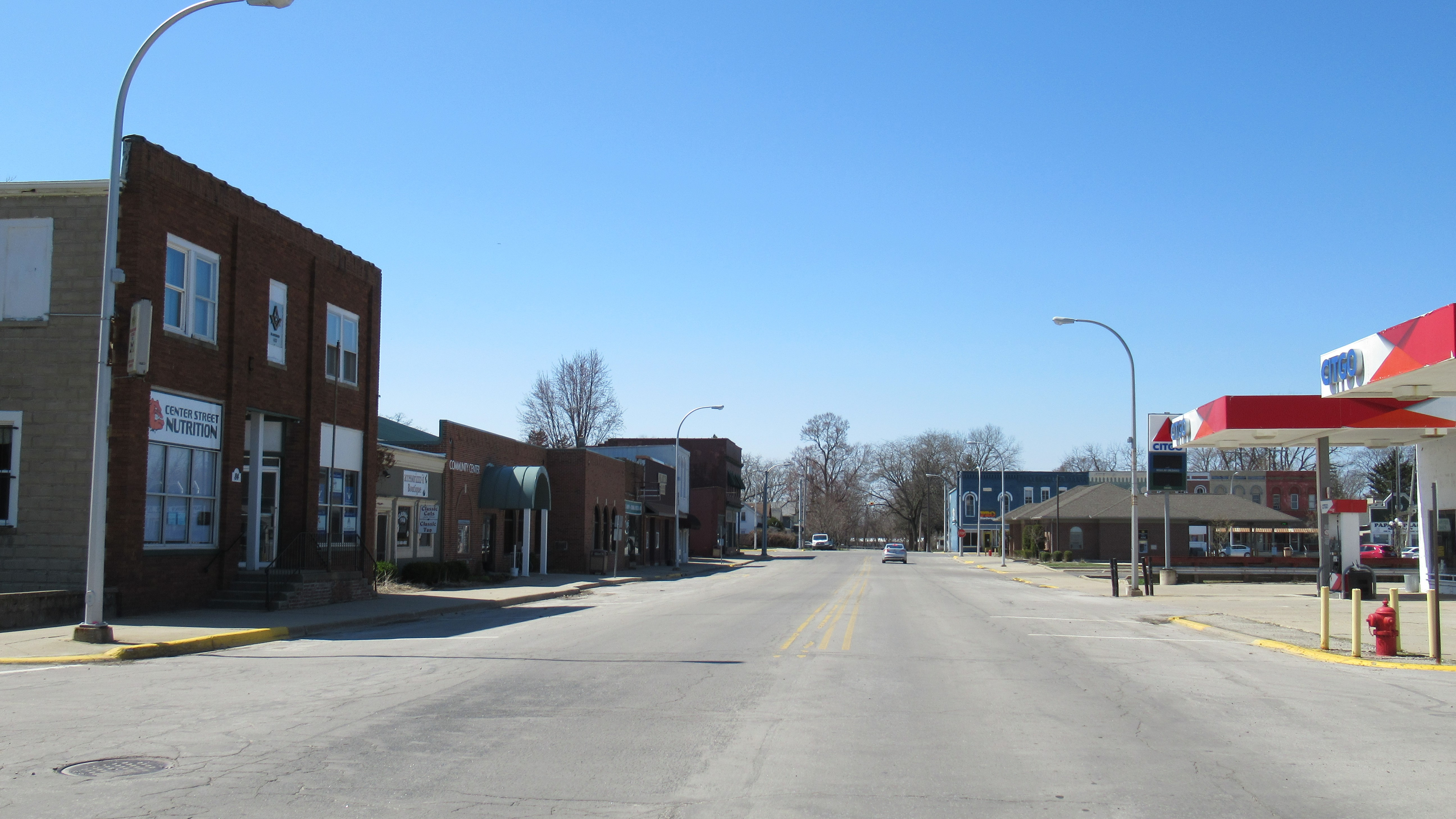
- Looking west along East Center Street

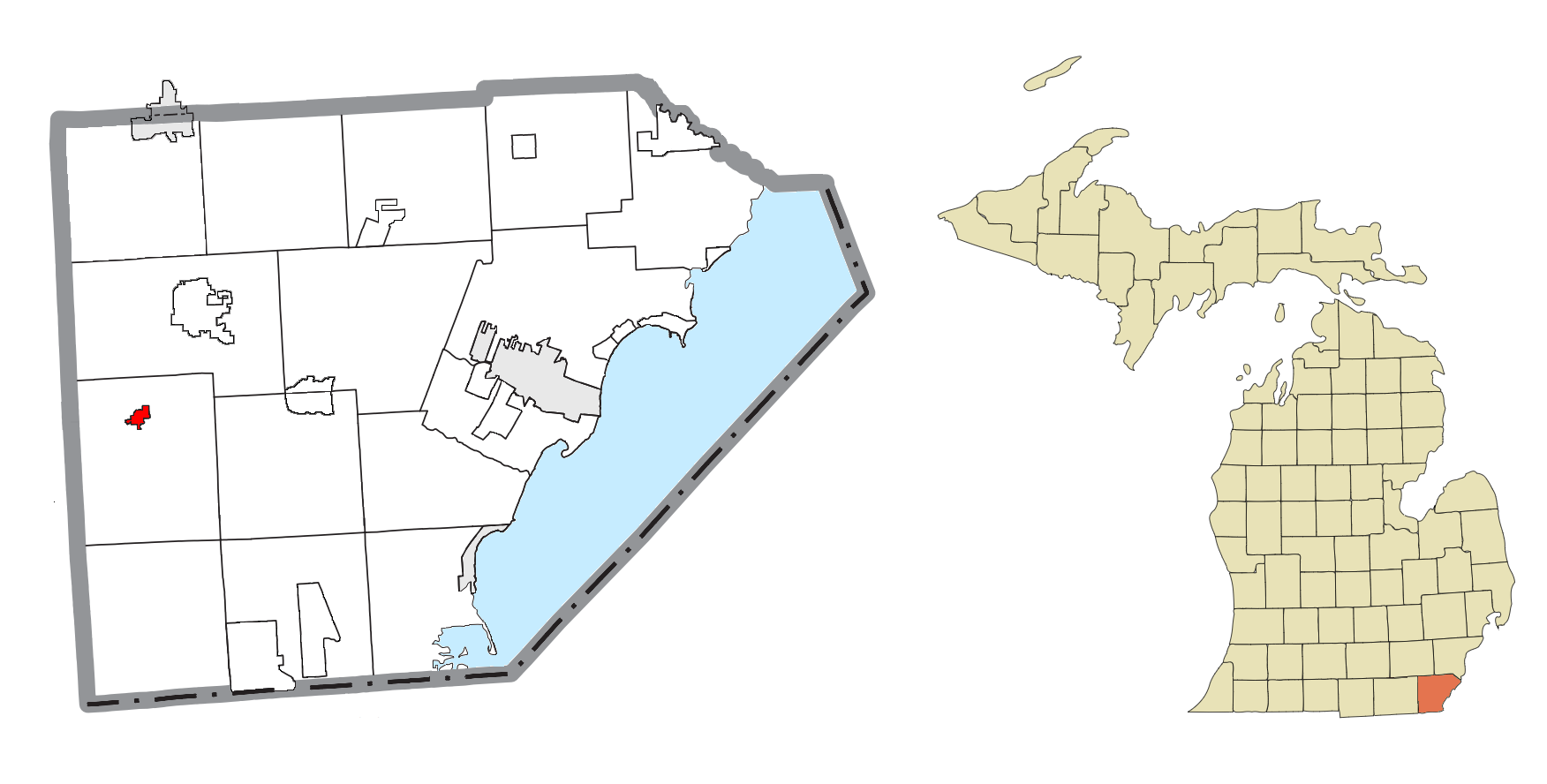
- Location within Monroe County

- Location within Michigan Location within the United States
- Coordinates: 41°54′04″N 83°42′54″W
- Country: United States
- State: Michigan
- County: Monroe
- Settled: 1824
- Established: 1836
- Incorporated: 1869 (village); 1967 (city)

Government
  - Type: Mayor–council
  - Mayor: Kevin Richards
  - Clerk: Jenny Doughty

Area
  - Total: 0.49 sq mi (1.27 km^{2})
  - Land: 0.48 sq mi (1.24 km^{2})
  - Water: 0.012 sq mi (0.03 km^{2})
- Elevation: 676 ft (206 m)

Population (2020)
  - Total: 1,171
  - Density: 2,425.5/sq mi (936.48/km^{2})
- Time zone: UTC-5 (Eastern (EST))
  - Summer (DST): UTC-4 (EDT)
- ZIP Code: 49270
- Area code: 734
- FIPS code: 26-63800
- GNIS feature ID: 0634708
- Website: petersburgmi.gov

Petersburg is a city in Monroe County in the U.S. state of Michigan. The population was 1,171 at the 2020 census.

At 0.49 square miles (1.27 km^{2}), Petersburg is the second-smallest city by land area in the state of Michigan, after Clarkston.

== History ==
The area was originally settled by Richard Peters as early as 1824, and he became the first postmaster when the Summerfield post office was established in April 1831. Monroe natives Thomas Cole and Austin Wing formally established the community on land purchased from Peters in 1836. The post office was renamed "Petersburgh" on January 14, 1863. The community incorporated as a village in 1869. The post office name was shortened to Petersburg on December 18, 1893. The village incorporated as a city in 1967.

== Geography ==
Petersburg is in western Monroe County, 17 miles (27 km) west of Monroe, the county seat, the same distance east of Adrian, and 21 miles (34 km) north of Toledo, Ohio. According to the U.S. Census Bureau, Petersburg has a total area of 0.49 square miles (1.27 km^{2}), of which 0.01 square miles (0.03 km^{2}), or 1.83%, are water. The River Raisin, a tributary of Lake Erie, forms part of the northwest edge of the city.

== Demographics ==
Historical population
| Census | Pop. | Note | %± |
|---|---|---|---|
| 1880 | 420 | | — |
| 1890 | 408 | | −2.9% |
| 1900 | 468 | | 14.7% |
| 1910 | 490 | | 4.7% |
| 1920 | 514 | | 4.9% |
| 1930 | 705 | | 37.2% |
| 1940 | 789 | | 11.9% |
| 1950 | 1,001 | | 26.9% |
| 1960 | 1,018 | | 1.7% |
| 1970 | 1,227 | | 20.5% |
| 1980 | 1,222 | | −0.4% |
| 1990 | 1,201 | | −1.7% |
| 2000 | 1,157 | | −3.7% |
| 2010 | 1,146 | | −1.0% |
| 2020 | 1,171 | | 2.2% |
U.S. Decennial Census

=== 2010 census ===
As of the census of 2010, there were 1,146 people, 449 households, and 315 families living in the city. The population density was 2,387.5 inhabitants per square mile (921.8/km^{2}). There were 476 housing units at an average density of 991.7 per square mile (382.9/km^{2}). The racial makeup of the city was 97.1% White, 0.3% African American, 0.3% Native American, 0.3% Asian, 0.3% from other races, and 1.6% from two or more races. Hispanic or Latino of any race were 1.7% of the population.

There were 449 households, of which 35.4% had children under the age of 18 living with them, 50.6% were married couples living together, 14.7% had a female householder with no husband present, 4.9% had a male householder with no wife present, and 29.8% were non-families. 22.5% of all households were made up of individuals, and 9.2% had someone living alone who was 65 years of age or older. The average household size was 2.55 and the average family size was 3.00.

The median age in the city was 36.6 years. 25% of residents were under the age of 18; 8.8% were between the ages of 18 and 24; 27% were from 25 to 44; 26.3% were from 45 to 64; and 12.8% were 65 years of age or older. The gender makeup of the city was 49.7% male and 50.3% female.

=== 2000 census ===
As of the census of 2000, there were 1,157 people, 423 households, and 307 families living in the city. The population density was 2,497.8 inhabitants per square mile (964.4/km^{2}). There were 442 housing units at an average density of 954.2 per square mile (368.4/km^{2}). The racial makeup of the city was 96.80% White, 0.35% African American, 0.43% Native American, 0.09% Asian, 0.35% from other races, and 1.99% from two or more races. Hispanic or Latino of any race were 1.12% of the population.

There were 423 households, out of which 39.0% had children under the age of 18 living with them, 58.4% were married couples living together, 9.7% had a female householder with no husband present, and 27.2% were non-families. 23.6% of all households were made up of individuals, and 9.9% had someone living alone who was 65 years of age or older. The average household size was 2.74 and the average family size was 3.23.

In the city, the population was spread out, with 30.5% under the age of 18, 9.2% from 18 to 24, 32.1% from 25 to 44, 19.5% from 45 to 64, and 8.7% who were 65 years of age or older. The median age was 32 years. For every 100 females, there were 94.5 males. For every 100 females age 18 and over, there were 91.9 males.

The median income for a household in the city was $44,861, and the median income for a family was $58,000. Males had a median income of $44,712 versus $26,250 for females. The per capita income for the city was $21,657. About 7.3% of families and 9.3% of the population were below the poverty line, including 14.8% of those under age 18 and 6.1% of those age 65 or over.

== Education ==
Petersburg is served by Summerfield Schools.

== Notable people ==
- Elizabeth C. Crosby, neuroanatomist who was born in Petersburg

== Images ==
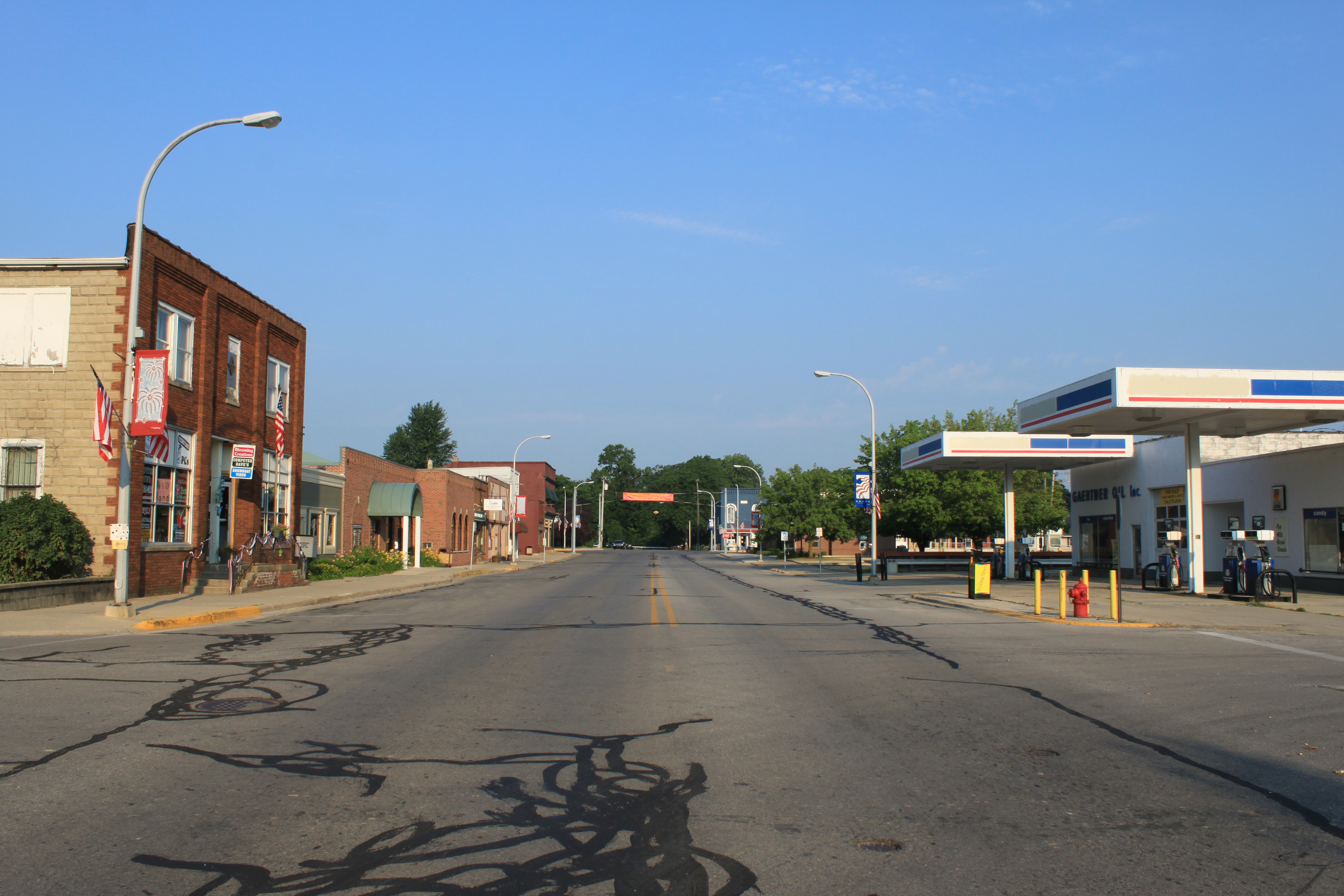
Downtown Petersburg in 2010

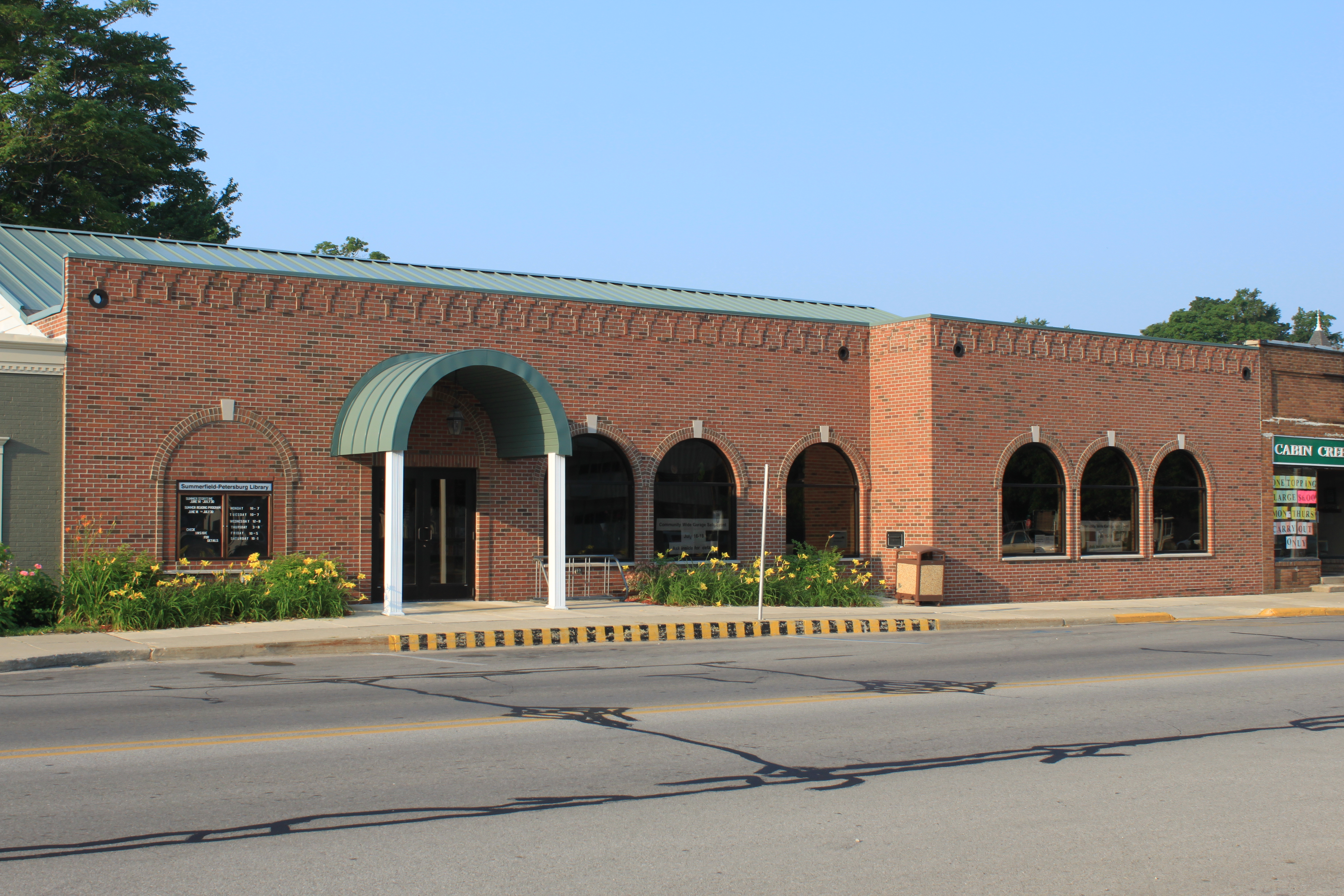
Summerfield–Petersburg Library

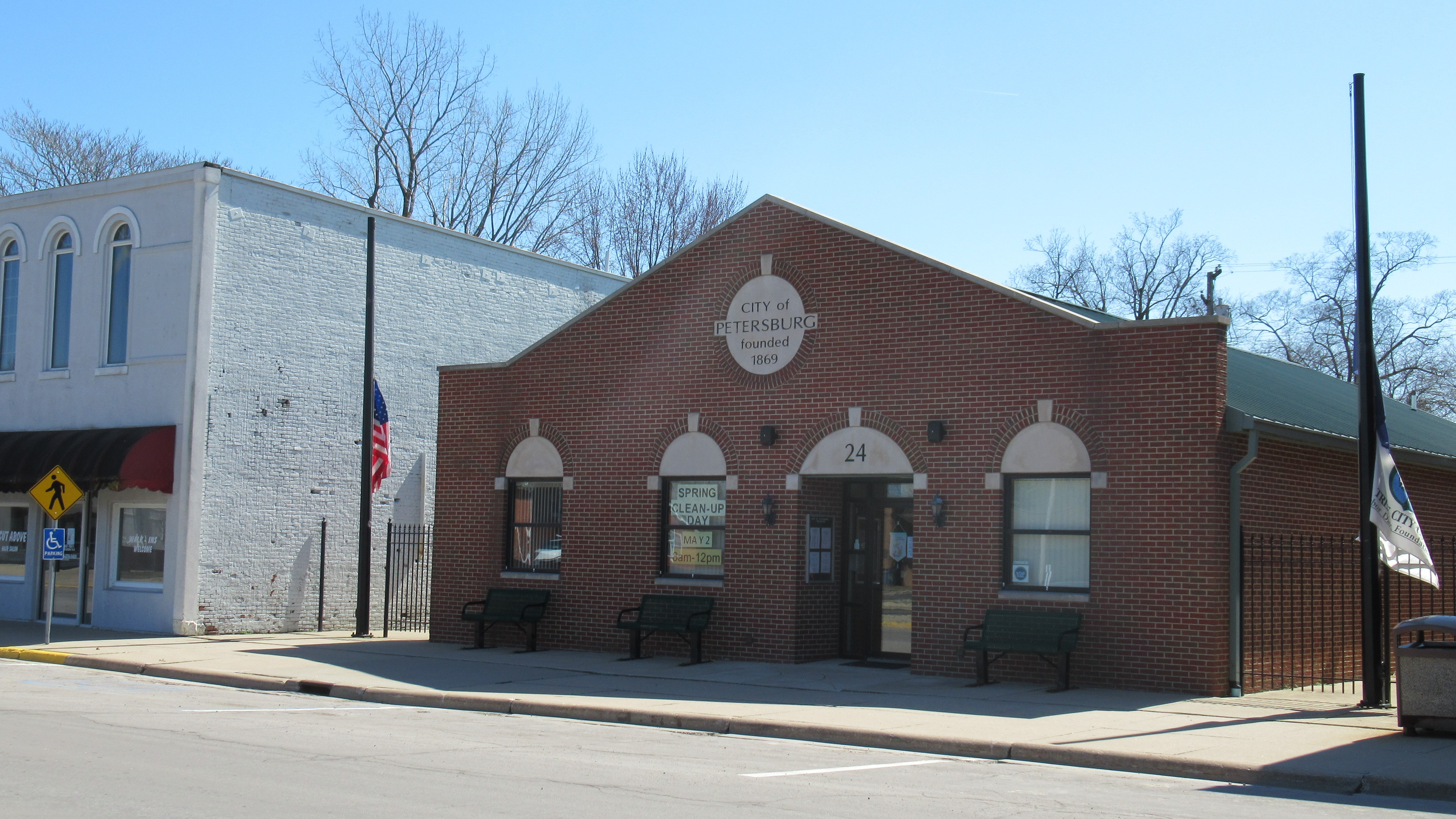
Petersburg City Hall

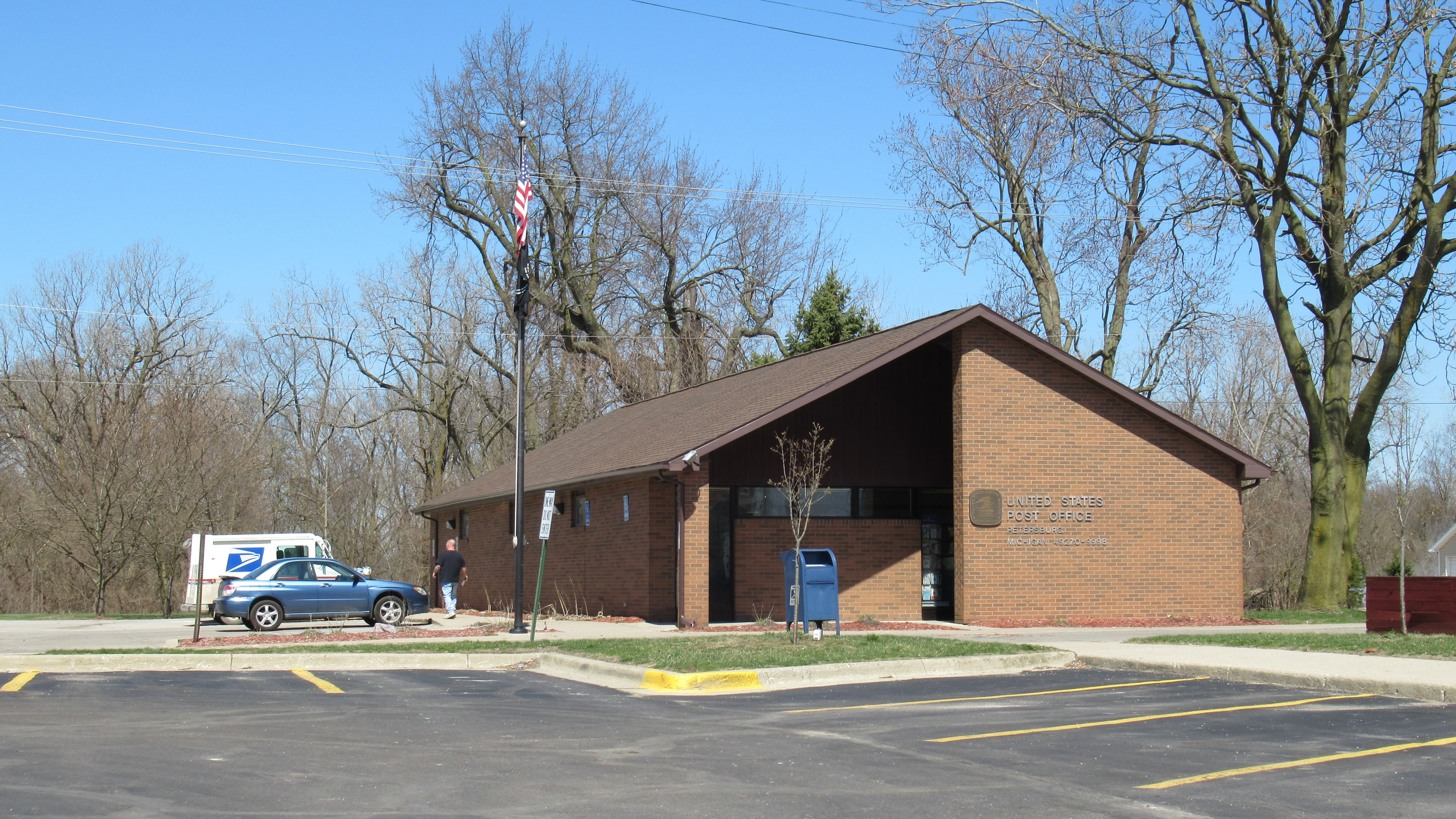
U.S. Post Office in Petersburg
