= Sterling Island =

Island in Michigan

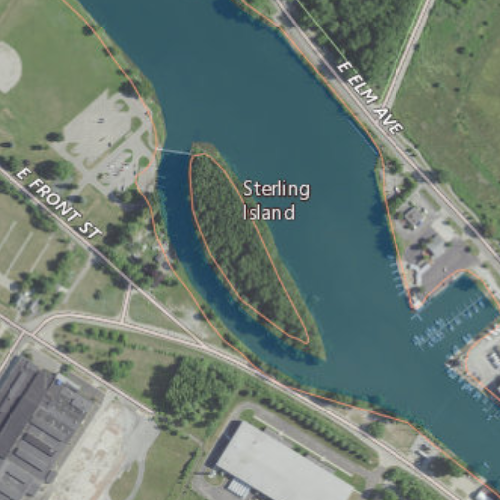
- USGS aerial imagery of Sterling Island

- Location within Michigan Location within the United States

Geography
- Location: Southeast Michigan
- Coordinates: 41°54′30″N 83°22′39″W
- Adjacent to: River Raisin
- Highest elevation: 571 ft (174 m)

Administration
- United States
- State: Michigan
- County: Monroe

Sterling Island is a man-made island in River Raisin, near Lake Erie. It is in Monroe County, Michigan. Its coordinates are 41°54′30″N 83°22′39″W, and the United States Geological Survey gives its elevation as 571 ft (174 m).

== See also ==
- Sisters Island (Michigan)
- Strong Island (Michigan)
