= Sisters Island (Michigan) =

Island in Michigan

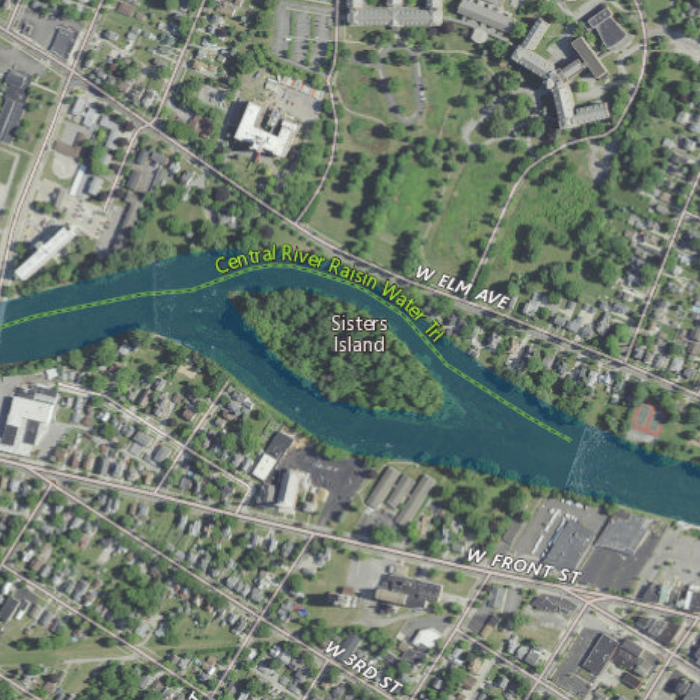
- USGS aerial imagery of Sisters Island

- Location within Michigan Location within the United States

Geography
- Location: Michigan
- Coordinates: 41°55′10″N 83°24′15″W
- Adjacent to: River Raisin
- Highest elevation: 587 ft (178.9 m)

Administration
- United States
- State: Michigan
- County: Monroe

Sisters Island is an island in River Raisin. It is in Monroe County, Michigan. Its coordinates are 41°55′10″N 83°24′15″W, and the United States Geological Survey gives its elevation as 587 ft (179 m).

== See also ==
- Sterling Island
- Strong Island (Michigan)
