= River Raisin =

River in southeastern Michigan, United States

River Raisin Rivière Aux Raisins
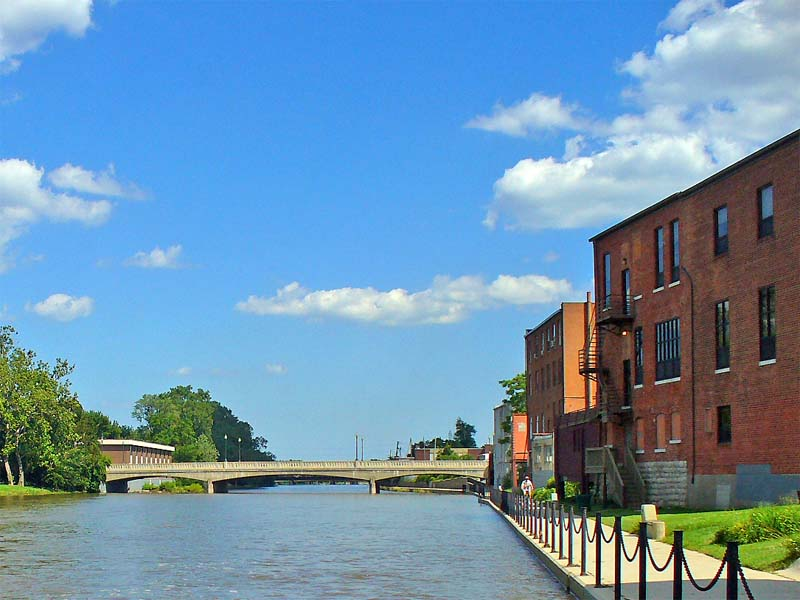
- The River Raisin flowing through Monroe

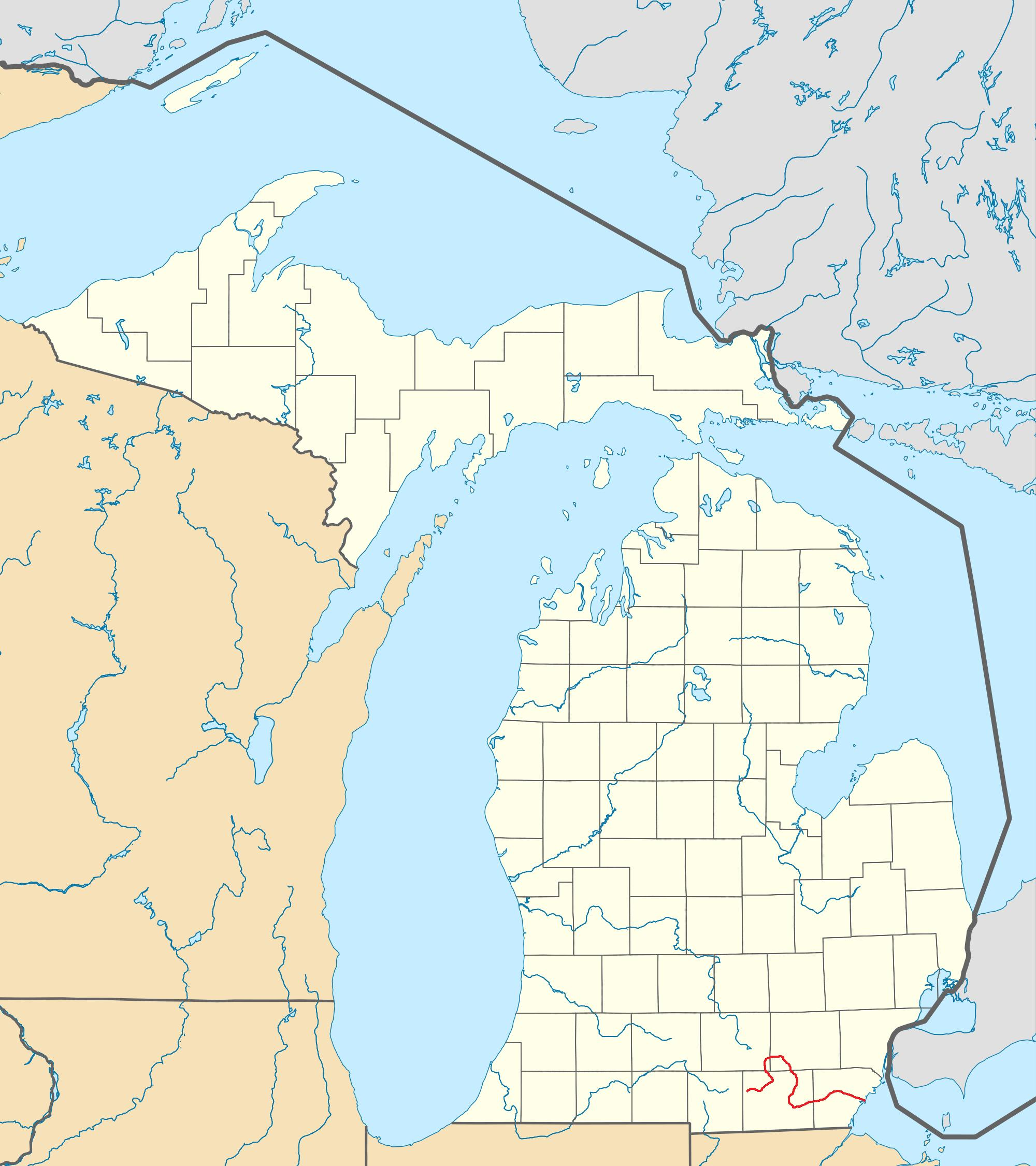
- Location of the River Raisin in Michigan

Location
- Country: United States
- State: Michigan
- Counties: Jackson, Lenawee, Monroe, Washtenaw
- Settlements: Blissfield, Brooklyn, Clinton, Deerfield, Dundee, Manchester, Monroe, Petersburg, Tecumseh

Physical characteristics
- Source
  - location: Rollin Township, Michigan
  - coordinates: 42°01′29″N 84°16′05″W
  - elevation: 1,043 ft (318 m)
- Mouth: Lake Erie
  - location: Monroe, Michigan
  - coordinates: 41°53′31″N 83°20′12″W
  - elevation: 571 ft (174 m)
- Length: 139 mi (224 km)
- Basin size: 1,072 sq mi (2,780 km^{2})
- Discharge
  - average: 741 cu ft/s (21.0 m^{3}/s)

The River Raisin (Ottawa: Nummasepee, 'River of Sturgeon') is a 135-mile-long (217 km) river in southeast Michigan, United States, that flows in a generally easterly direction through glacial sediments before emptying into Lake Erie. The River Raisin drainage basin covers approximately 1,072 square miles (2,780 km^{2}) in the Michigan counties of Monroe, Lenawee, Washtenaw, Jackson, and Hillsdale, along with Fulton County in northwest Ohio.

Today, the land within its bounds is primarily used for agriculture, and light industry. Historically, the river served as a canoe transportation route for various Native American tribes, and for French Canadian Voyageurs. The river's English name comes from the French Rivière aux Raisins (translated as "River of Grapes"), in reference to the wild grapes growing along its banks.

== History and geography ==
The River Raisin was used by local Potawatomi and Wyandot peoples, who had established portages between the upper river and the Grand and Kalamazoo rivers that flowed west toward Lake Michigan. The river is still classified as canoeable throughout its length, however, a low gradient, access issues, frequent logjams in the upper reaches, and 22 dams limit its recreational use.

The first European settlers along the river were French Canadians, who in the 1780s developed their traditional ribbon farms along the river and established a settlement known as Frenchtown. The farms had narrow fronts on the river so that farmers would have access, with deep rectangular lots reaching back from the river. Now part of Monroe, Michigan, this area is still the most populous area along the river. The resort area of Irish Hills lies in the uppermost region of the watershed, which includes 429 lakes and ponds. The largest of these is the 800-acre (3.2 km^{2}) Lake Columbia.

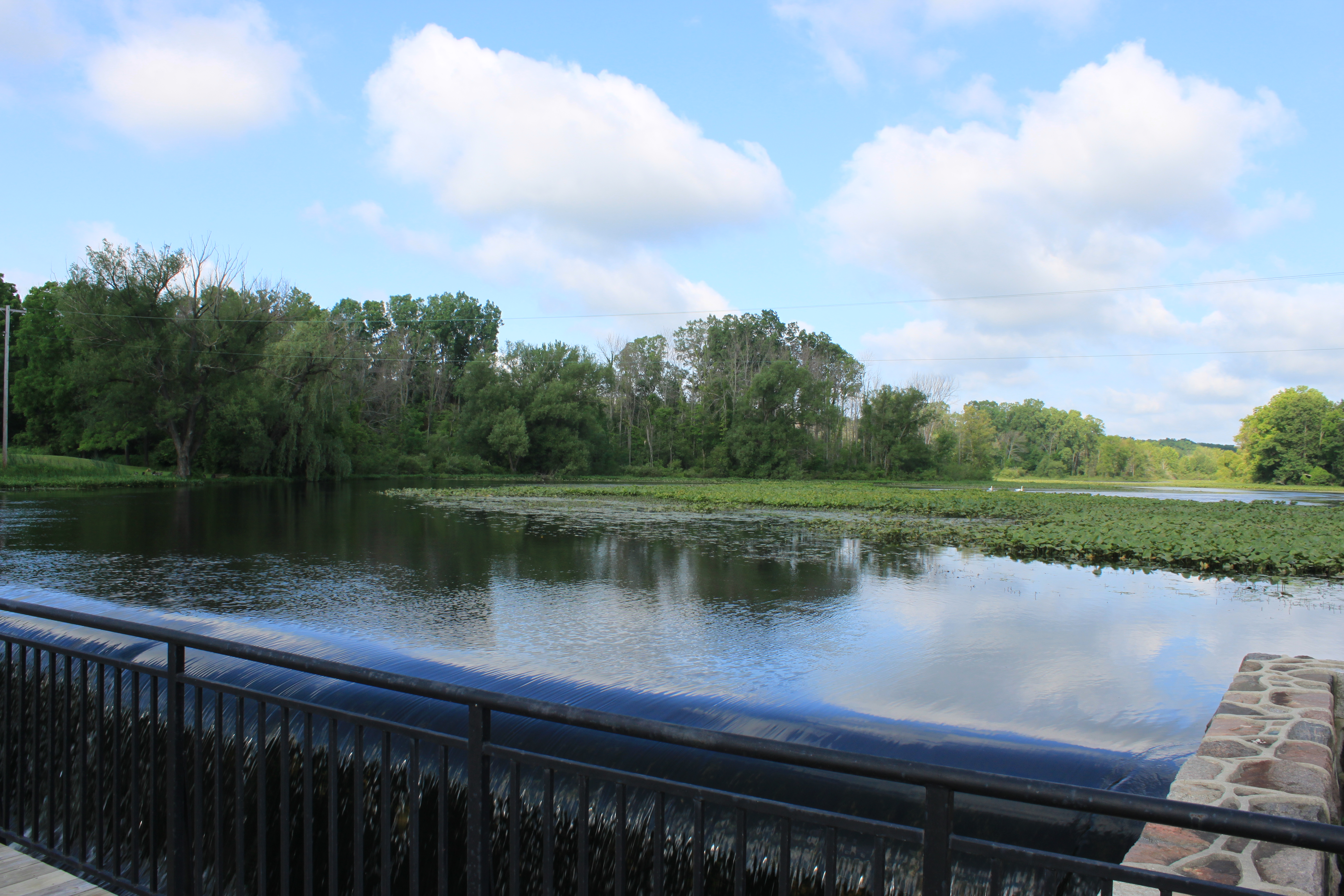
River Raisin through Sharon Township

During the winter of 1813 as part of the War of 1812, the Battle of Frenchtown occurred on the banks of the river. British and Indigenous forces under the command of Henry Procter and the Wyandot war leader Roundhead fought against a division of ill-trained Kentucky regulars and militia under the command of Brigadier General James Winchester. After he was captured Winchester ordered his men to surrender after receiving British assurances of safety for the prisoners. The British escorted those who could walk to Amherstburg in Upper Canada.

The next day, however, many of the severely wounded prisoners left behind in Frenchtown were murdered by some of Britain's Indigenous allies. The River Raisin Massacre triggered a rallying cry ("Remember the Raisin") for Americans in the war, particularly for Kentuckians. American troops returned in September to drive the British from Michigan.

The original battlefield was preserved for years as a county park in Monroe, Michigan and had several monuments erected to the Kentucky soldiers who died there. On October 12, 2010, the land was transferred from the state to the federal government. By Congressional authorization, it is the only National Battlefield Park designating a battlefield of the War of 1812 - the River Raisin National Battlefield Park.

Since industrialization and intensified agriculture, the river has been polluted by industrial wastes and agricultural runoff. While cleanup efforts have mitigated some of the pollution, difficult-to-remove PCBs continue to constitute a hazardous waste. An established Area of Concern covers only 2 square miles (5.2 km^{2}) of the watershed at the mouth of the river, much of which is devoted to industrial and harbor use, including the Ford Motor Company plant, Detroit Edison Monroe powerplant, and the Port of Monroe. Environmental authorities advise people not to eat some species of fish from the river, if taken below the outlet of the Monroe Dam.

The river has many small dams to control water flow. These were erected to power the many paper mills constructed along it in the mid-1800s during the lumber boom. They are also products of Henry Ford's rural industry program. While most of the dams are in Monroe, the most significant one is located in Dundee, Michigan. The Port of Monroe was constructed near the mouth of the river in the 1930s, as a needed infrastructure project sponsored by the President Franklin D. Roosevelt administration during the Great Depression.

Flooding along the river has three causes: heavy rains, ice dams developing during spring break-up, and on-shore winds pushing Lake Erie waters upstream. The worst flood was recorded on March 16, 1982, at 15,300 cu ft/s (430 m^{3}/s), compared to an average mean flow of 741 cu ft/s (21.0 m^{3}/s). Flooding affects mostly the lowest portions of the river. By contrast on July 13, 1988, during a severe drought, a measuring station found 0 cu ft/s (0 m^{3}/s) of water flow.

Most of the flow of the river is diverted through the Detroit Edison plant and discharged into Plum Creek. Previously it was discharged into the river, but it is now diverted to limit additional pollution of the river mouth area. The power plant's peak use of 3,000 cu ft/s (85 m^{3}/s) of water exceeds the river's average flow of 741 cu ft/s (21.0 m^{3}/s), so on some occasions, water is drawn upstream from Lake Erie into the plant. The high level of industrial water use is thought to kill large numbers of fish in the intake screens and to make fish migration from the river into the Great Lakes almost impossible.

In 2013 U.S. Rep. Tim Walberg, along with the entire Michigan delegation, introduced a resolution (H. Res. 37, 113th Congress) to honor the 200th anniversary of the battles at the River Raisin.

=== Tributaries ===
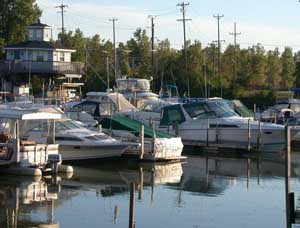
Boats docked near the mouth of River Raisin

In addition to the river forming from the Upper River Raisin and the South Branch River Raisin, the following streams flow into the River Raisin:

- Goose Creek
- Black Creek
- Evans Creek
- Iron Creek
- Little River Raisin
- Macon Creek
- Saline River

=== Islands ===
- Sisters Island (Michigan)
- Sterling Island
- Strong Island (Michigan)

The Eagle Island Marsh is part of the Detroit River International Wildlife Refuge.

== Flora and fauna ==
The River Raisin is home to "warm-water" fish including bluegill, white sucker, channel catfish,Northern pike, walleye, carp, white bass, black buffalo, freshwater drum and smallmouth bass. Very few fish migrate between the river and the Great Lakes because they are blocked by the seven dams in Monroe, as well as the power plant intakes. Bird species use the area as part of the migratory flyway along eastern Lake Erie; they include bald eagles, sandhill cranes, ducks and seagulls. Invasive fauna include zebra mussels and rusty crayfish. The threatened American lotus is present in Eagle Island Marsh, but it must compete with several invasive plant species in the watershed, including flowering rush, Eurasian milfoil, curlyleaf pondweed, Phragmites and purple loosestrife.

== Communities ==
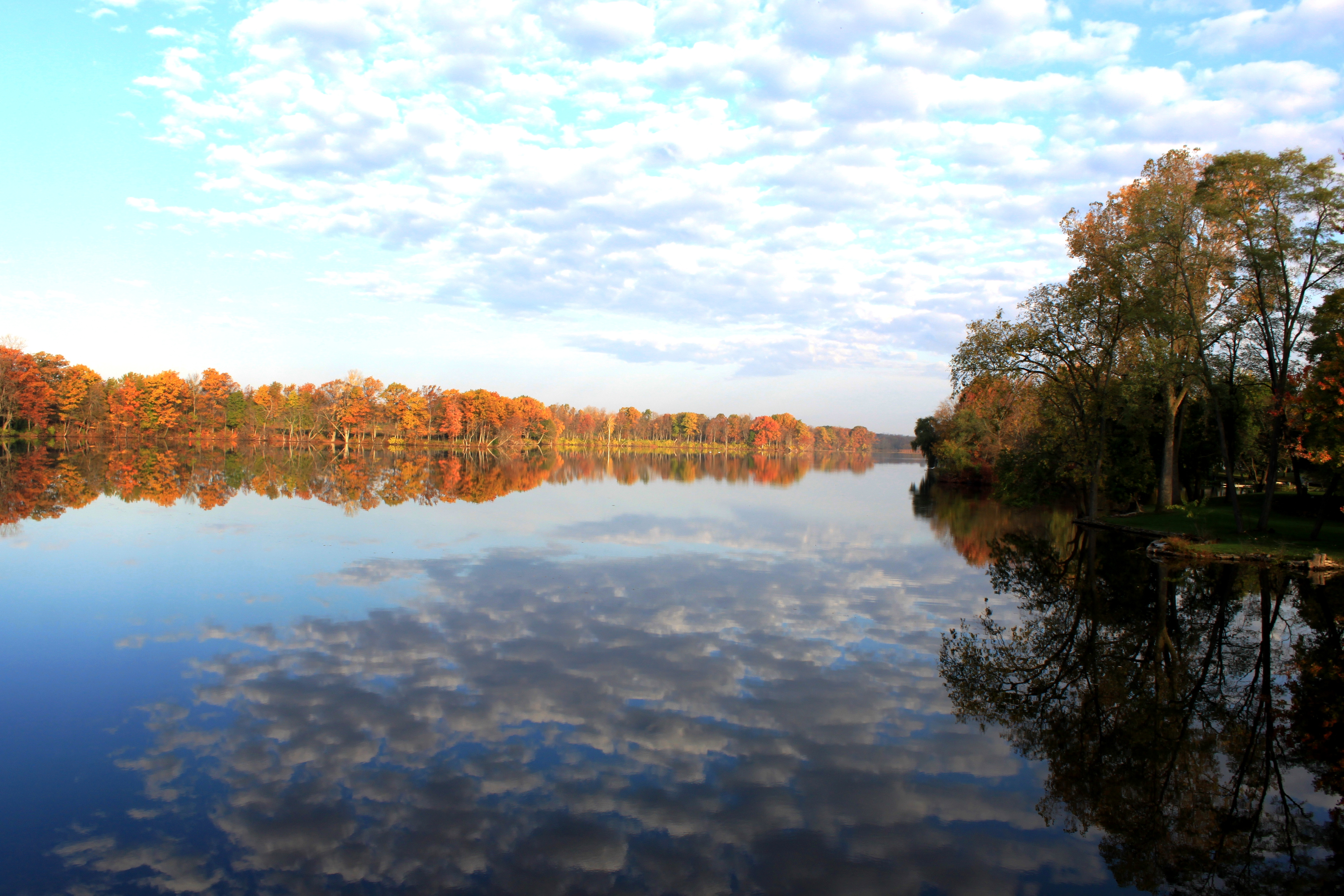
Red Millpond, Tecumseh

Cities and villages along the river include:

- Monroe, Michigan
- Dundee, Michigan
- Petersburg, Michigan
- Deerfield, Michigan
- Blissfield, Michigan
- Adrian, Michigan
- Tecumseh, Michigan
- Clinton, Michigan
- Manchester, Michigan
- Brooklyn, Michigan

== Crossings ==
River Raisin crossings are located in communities within four counties of Michigan.

List of crossings
Name	Type	Location	County
I-75 (Detroit–Toledo Freeway)	Interstate Highway	Monroe	Monroe
Winchester Parkway	Local road	Monroe	Monroe
Macomb Street	Local road	Monroe	Monroe
M-125 (Monroe Street)	Michigan highway	Monroe	Monroe
Roessler Street	Local road	Monroe	Monroe
US 24 (Telegraph Road)	U.S. Route	Monroe	Monroe
Raisinville Road	Local road	Monroe Twp./ Frenchtown Twp.	Monroe
Ida–Maybee Road	Local road	Raisinville Twp.	Monroe
M-50 (Monroe Street)	Michigan highway	Dundee	Monroe
US 23	U.S. Route	Dundee	Monroe
Petersburg Road	Local road	Petersburg/ Summerfield Twp.	Monroe
Railroad Street/Deerfield Road	Local road	Petersburg/ Summerfield Twp.	Monroe
Rodesiler Highway	Local road	Deerfield Twp.	Lenawee
US 223 (Adrian Street)	U.S. Route	Blissfield	Lenawee
Crockett Highway	Local road	Palmyra Twp.	Lenawee
US 223	U.S. Route	Palmyra Twp.	Lenawee
Deerfield Road	Local road	Palmyra Twp.	Lenawee
Academy Road	Local road	Palmyra Twp.	Lenawee
Laberdee Road	Local road	Raisin Twp.	Lenawee
Wilmoth Highway	Local road	Raisin Twp.	Lenawee
Raisin Center Highway	Local road	Raisin Twp.	Lenawee
Sutton Road	Local road	Raisin Twp.	Lenawee
Russell Road	Local road	Tecumseh	Lenawee
M-50 (Chicago Boulevard)	Michigan highway	Tecumseh	Lenawee
Evans Street	Local road	Tecumseh	Lenawee
Staib Road	Local road	Clinton Twp.	Lenawee
US 12 (Michigan Avenue)	U.S. Route	Clinton	Lenawee
Allen Road	Local road	Bridgewater Twp.	Washtenaw
Wilbur Road	Local road	Bridgewater Twp.	Washtenaw
Austin Road	Local road	Manchester Twp.	Washtenaw
M-52 (City Road)	Michigan highway	Manchester	Washtenaw
Duncan Street	Local road	Manchester	Washtenaw
Main Street	Local road	Manchester	Washtenaw
Sharon Valley Road	Local road	Sharon Twp.	Washtenaw
Sharon Hollow Road	Local road	Sharon Twp.	Washtenaw
Sharon Valley Road	Local road	Sharon Twp.	Washtenaw
Pierce Road	Local road	Norvell Twp.	Jackson
Mill Road	Local road	Norvell Twp.	Jackson
Austin Road	Local road	Norvell Twp.	Jackson
Palmer Road/Wolf Lake Road	Local road	Columbia Twp.	Jackson
Mill Street	Local road	Brooklyn	Jackson
M-124 (Wampers Lake Road)	Michigan highway	Columbia Twp.	Jackson
Daugherty Road	Local road	Columbia Twp.	Jackson
Monroe Pike Road	Local road	Columbia Twp.	Jackson
M-50	Michigan highway	Columbia Twp.	Jackson
US 12 (Michigan Avenue)	U.S. Route	Cambridge Twp.	Lenawee
Miller Highway	Local road	Woodstock Twp.	Lenawee
