= Columbia Township, Jackson County, Michigan =

Columbia Township, Michigan
- Civil township
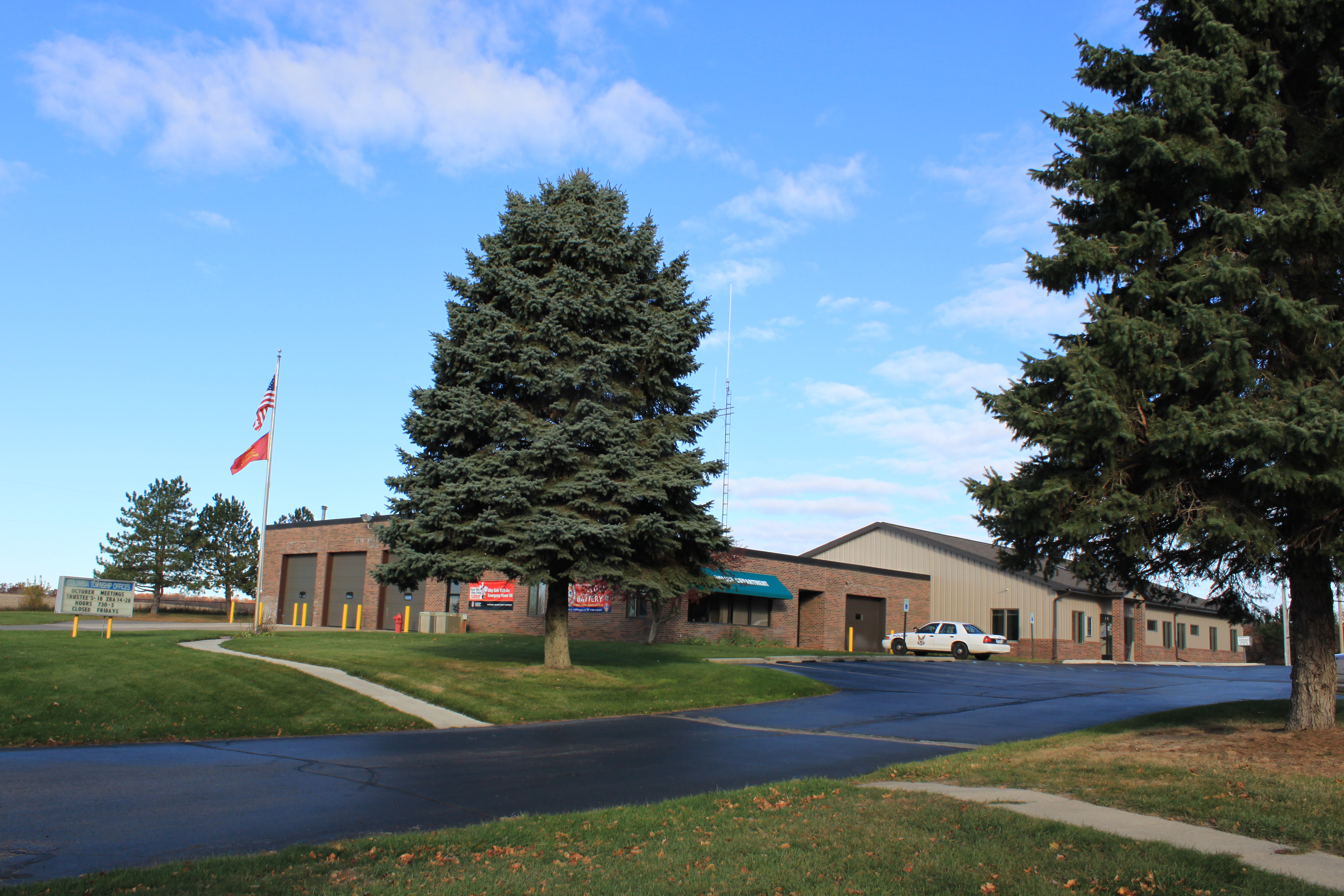
- Township Offices on Jefferson Road

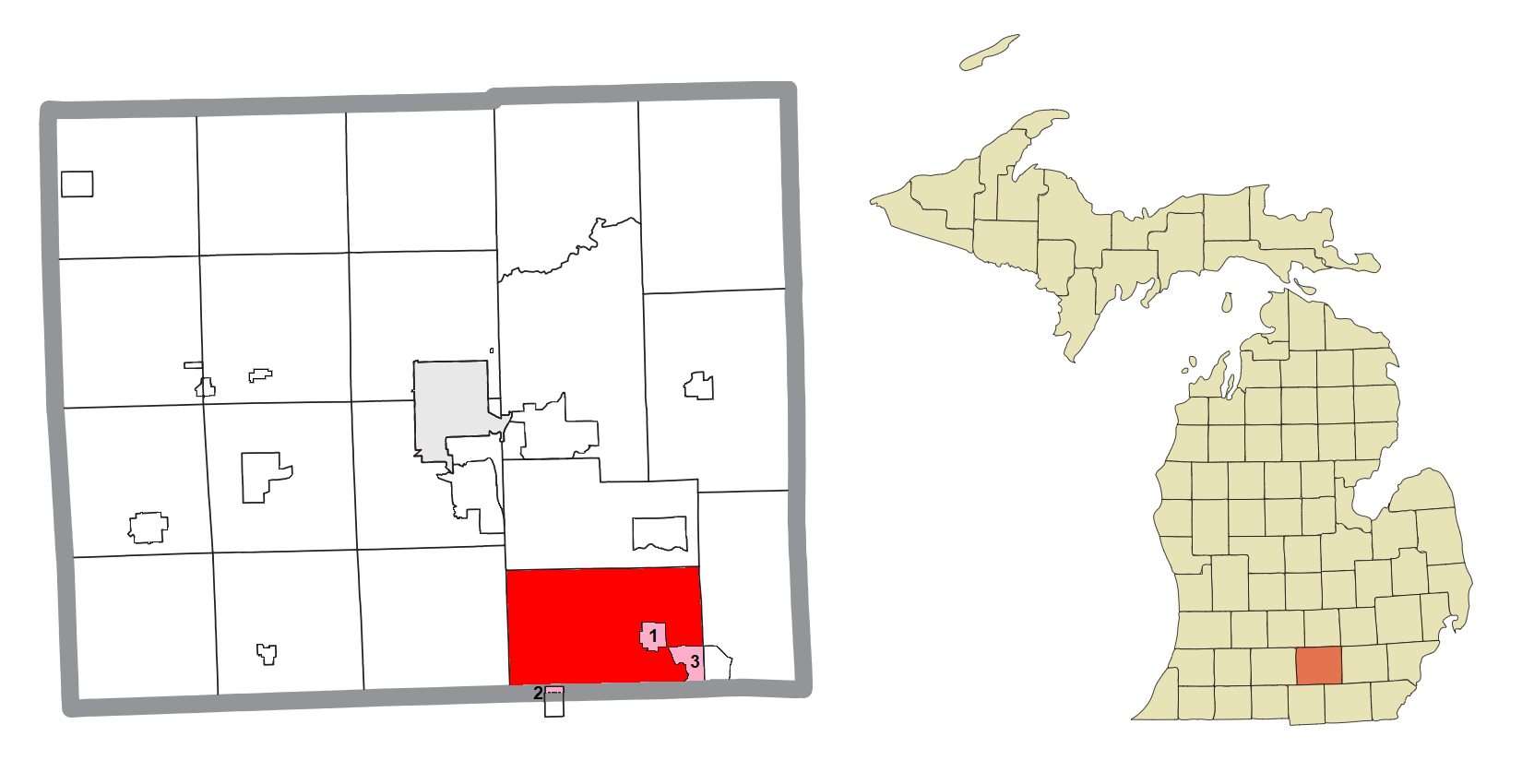
- Location within Jackson County and the administered village of Brooklyn (1), portions of Cement City (2) and Vineyard Lake CDP (3)

- Location within the state of Michigan Columbia Township (the United States)
- Coordinates: 42°06′14″N 84°17′12″W
- Country: United States
- State: Michigan
- County: Jackson

Government
  - Supervisor: Robert Elrod
  - Clerk: Barry Marsh

Area
  - Total: 39.60 sq mi (102.6 km^{2})
  - Land: 36.64 sq mi (94.9 km^{2})
  - Water: 2.96 sq mi (7.7 km^{2})
- Elevation: 1,004 ft (306 m)

Population (2020)
  - Total: 7,392
  - Density: 201.7/sq mi (77.89/km^{2})
- Time zone: UTC-5 (Eastern (EST))
  - Summer (DST): UTC-4 (EDT)
- ZIP code(s): 49201 (Jackson); 49230 (Brooklyn); 49233 (Cement City); 49234 (Clarklake)
- Area code: 517
- FIPS code: 26-17400
- GNIS feature ID: 1626119
- Website: www.twp.columbia.mi.us

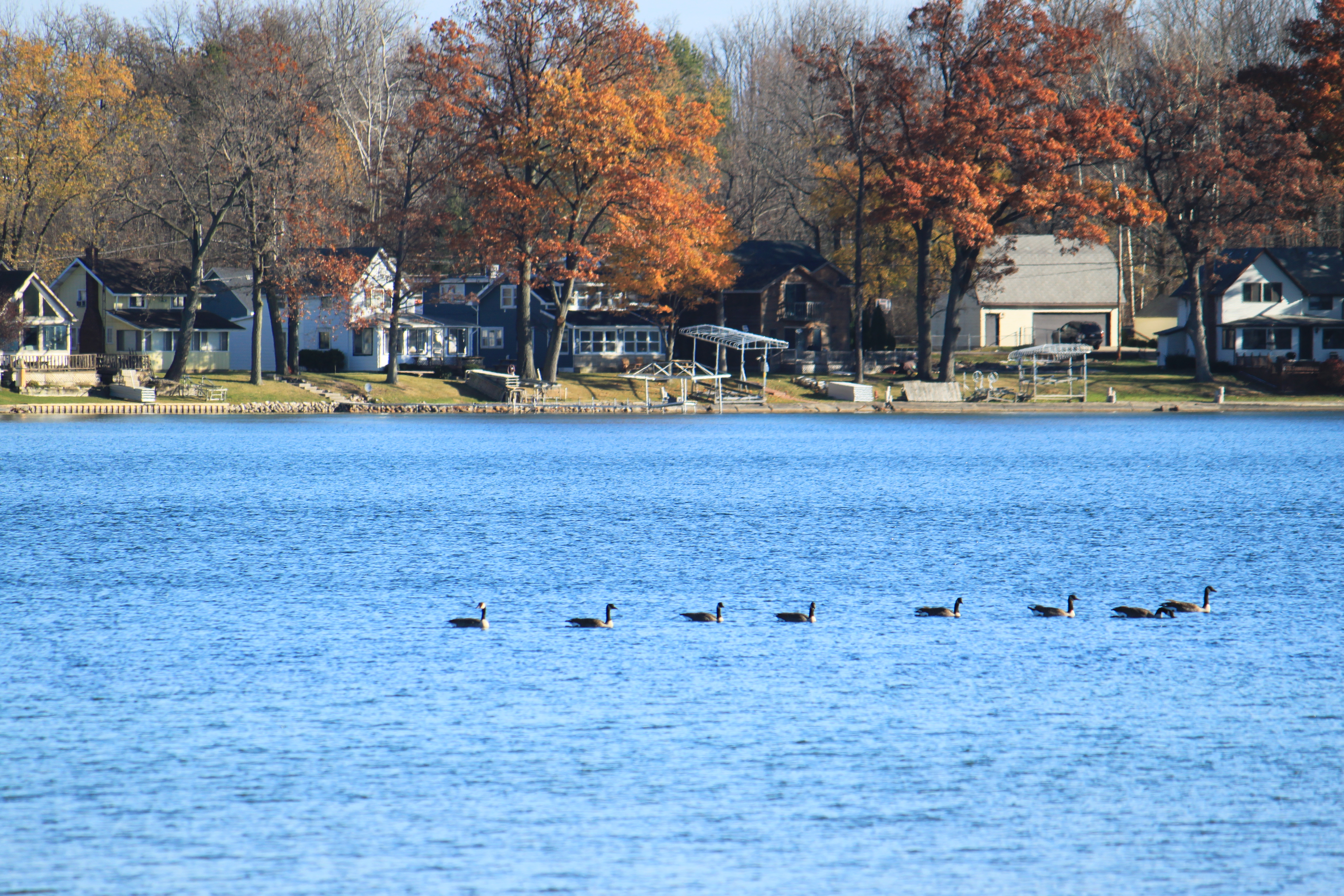
Clark Lake

Columbia Township is a civil township of Jackson County in the U.S. state of Michigan. As of the 2020 census, the population was 7,392.

== Communities ==
- Brooklyn is a village in the southeast of the township.
- Cement City (primarily in Lenawee County) lies within the south-central part of the township.
- Clarklake is an unincorporated community around Clark Lake in the northwest of the township served by a US Post Office with the ZIP Code of 49234. It began as a settlement in 1833.
- Lake Columbia is an unincorporated community around Lake Columbia in the south central part of the township.
- Vineyard Lake is an unincorporated community and census-designated place partially within the township.

== Geography ==
According to the United States Census Bureau, the township has a total area of 39.60 square miles (102.56 km^{2}), of which 36.64 square miles (94.90 km^{2}) is land and 2.96 square miles (7.67 km^{2}) (7.47%) is water.

The township is in southeastern Jackson County and is bordered to the south by Lenawee County. U.S. Route 127 follows the western border of the township and leads north 10 miles (16 km) to Jackson, the county seat, and south 19 miles (31 km) to Hudson. M-50 runs through the eastern side of the township and the village of Brooklyn, leading northwest 14 miles (23 km) to Jackson and southeast 19 miles (31 km) to Tecumseh. M-124 runs east-southeast from Brooklyn past Vineyard Lake and Wamplers Lake 8 miles (13 km) to US-12 in Lenawee County.

The township is the headwaters of the River Raisin which passes through Vineyard Lake and ultimately flows east to Lake Erie. Goose Creek passes through the manmade lake Lake Columbia then into the Raisin River. The headwaters of the Grand River pass through the west end of the township, ultimately leading north and west to Lake Michigan.

The township contains the northern part of the Michigan International Speedway property.

== Government ==
As of 2024:

- Supervisor Barry Marsh
- Clerk Cathy Hulburt
- Treasurer John C. Calhoun
- Trustees Robin Tackett, Rick Deland, Brent Beamish, and Rick Church

The township has a 24/7 police department, as well as a part-paid fire department (25 paid on-call), with two full-time fire personnel chief/fire inspector and assistant chief and two fire stations.

== Demographics ==
As of the census of 2000, there were 7,234 people, 2,894 households, and 2,115 families residing in the township. The population density was 197.8 inhabitants per square mile (76.4/km^{2}). There were 3,552 housing units at an average density of 97.1 per square mile (37.5/km^{2}). The racial makeup of the township was 97.82% White, 0.07% African American, 0.30% Native American, 0.36% Asian, 0.39% from other races, and 1.06% from two or more races. Hispanic or Latino of any race were 1.37% of the population.

There were 2,894 households, out of which 29.3% had children under the age of 18 living with them, 63.0% were married couples living together, 7.0% had a female householder with no husband present, and 26.9% were non-families. 22.5% of all households were made up of individuals, and 9.4% had someone living alone who was 65 years of age or older. The average household size was 2.48 and the average family size was 2.89.

In the township the population was spread out, with 23.2% under the age of 18, 6.3% from 18 to 24, 26.6% from 25 to 44, 28.5% from 45 to 64, and 15.4% who were 65 years of age or older. The median age was 42 years. For every 100 females, there were 98.0 males. For every 100 females age 18 and over, there were 94.9 males.

The median income for a household in the township was $51,632, and the median income for a family was $60,111. Males had a median income of $43,359 versus $30,410 for females. The per capita income for the township was $25,763. About 3.4% of families and 4.9% of the population were below the poverty line, including 6.2% of those under age 18 and 5.7% of those age 65 or over.
