= Cement City, Michigan =

- Village
- Village of Cement City
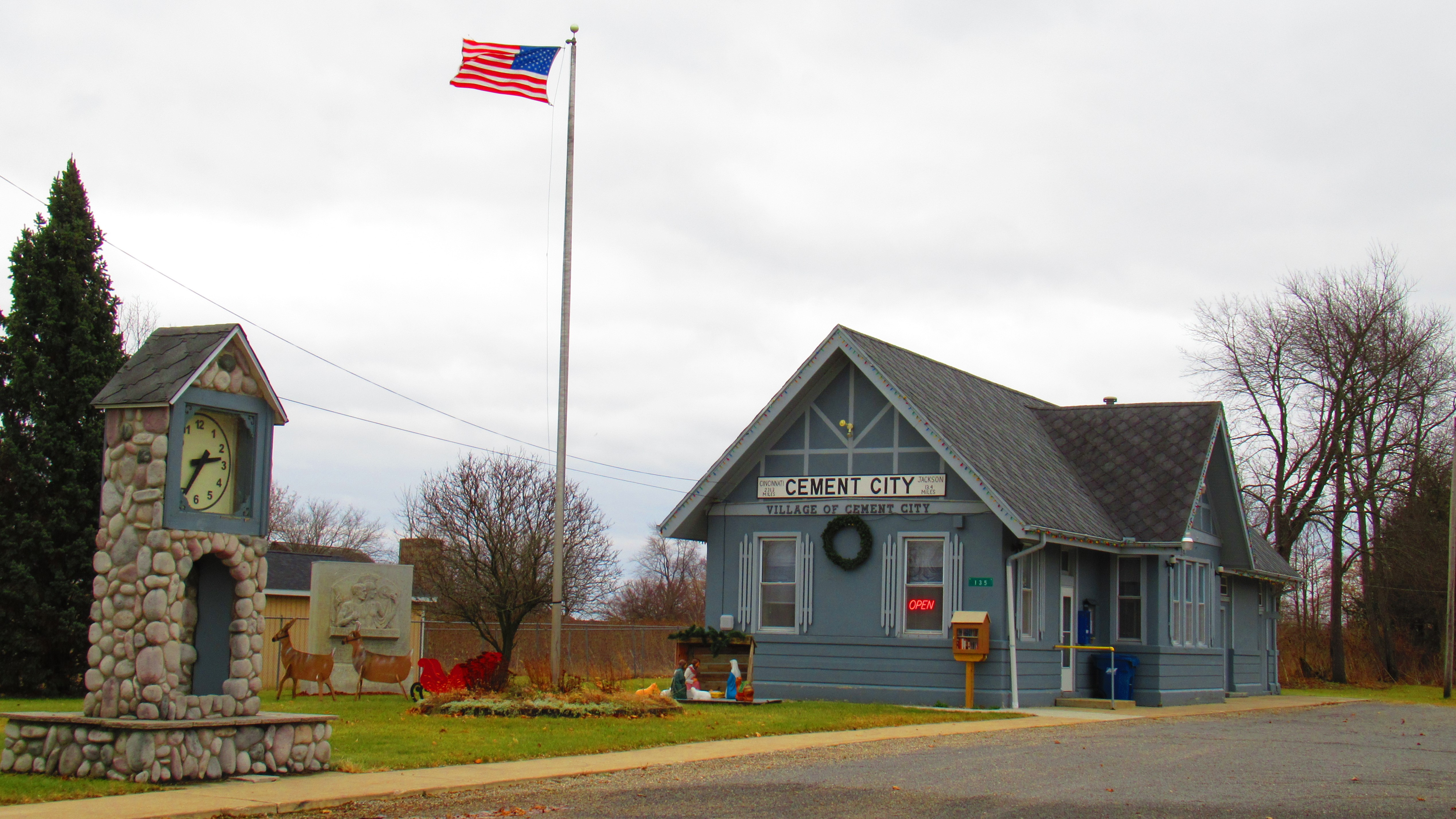
- Cement City village office

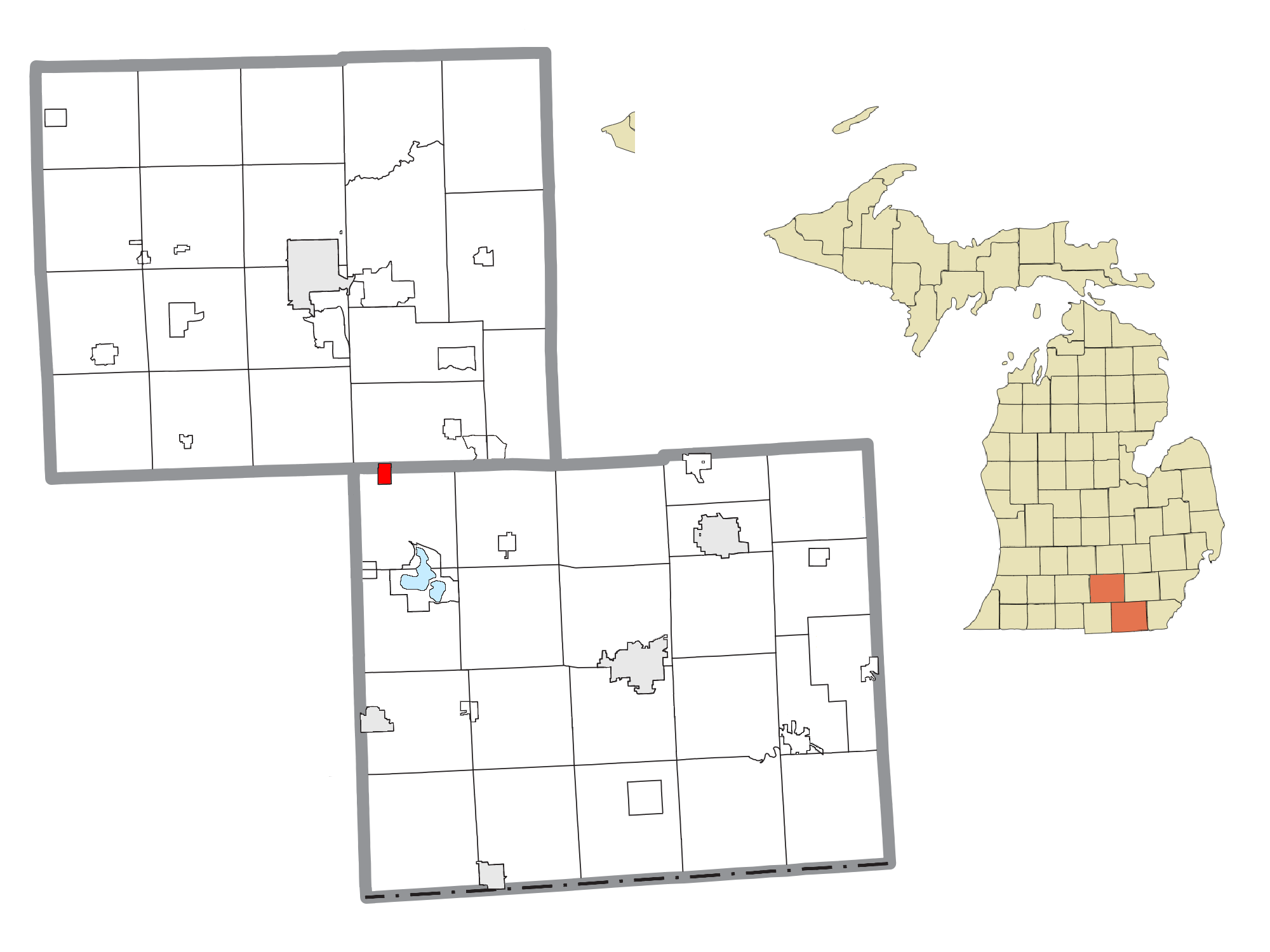
- Location within Jackson County (top) and Lenawee County (bottom)

- Location within the state of Michigan Location within the United States
- Coordinates: 42°04′09″N 84°19′47″W
- Country: United States
- State: Michigan
- Counties: Jackson and Lenawee
- Townships: Columbia and Woodstock
- Incorporated: 1953

Government
  - Type: Village council
  - President: Zachery Karnaz
  - Clerk: Carol Ladd

Area
  - Total: 0.93 sq mi (2.40 km^{2})
  - Land: 0.89 sq mi (2.31 km^{2})
  - Water: 0.035 sq mi (0.09 km^{2})
- Elevation: 1,056 ft (322 m)

Population (2020)
  - Total: 424
  - Density: 475.7/sq mi (183.67/km^{2})
- Time zone: UTC-5 (Eastern (EST))
  - Summer (DST): UTC-4 (EDT)
- ZIP code(s): 49233
- Area code: 517
- FIPS code: 26-14260
- GNIS feature ID: 0622963
- Website: Official website

Cement City is a village in the U.S. state of Michigan. The village is located within Woodstock Township in Lenawee County, with a small northern portion within Columbia Township in Jackson County. The population was 424 at the 2020 census.

== History ==
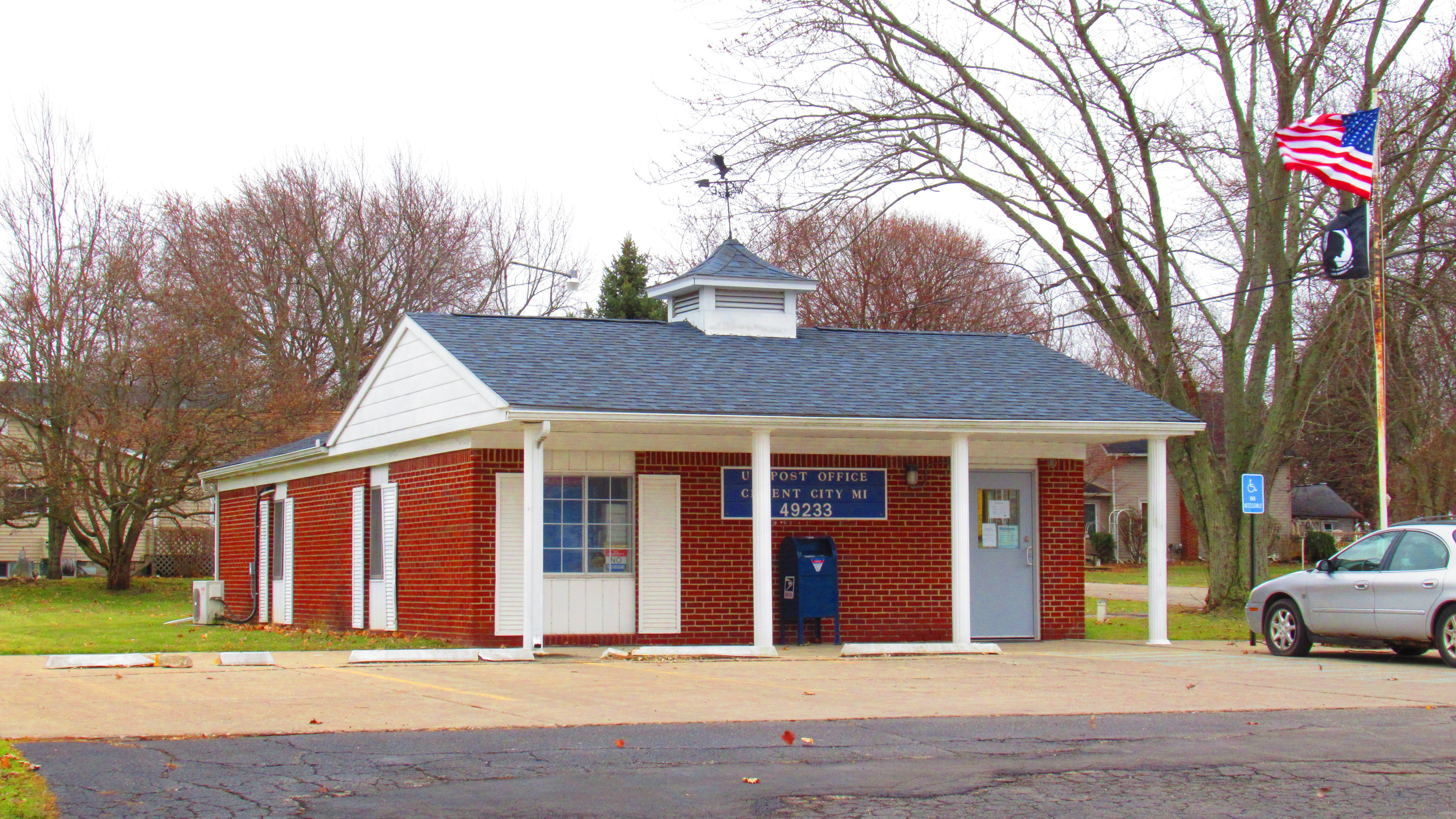
Cement City Post Office

The location first was given a post office named Woodstock after the township on January 3, 1838, with postmaster Almer Smith. While the post office was closed on October 13, 1859, but quickly reopened On December 3. The post was open until May 5, 1871, then again from January 27, 1881, to May 21, 1887.

Kelly's Corners post office, named after local early landowner Orson Kelly opened with John E. Turk as postmaster on February 17, 1868. On December 6, 1886, Kelly's Corner was renamed as Woodstock then to Cement on February 21, 1901. This after the 1900 formation of an unincorporated village under William Cohan in 1900 and named for the pending coming of a cement company. On March 5, 1901, the post office was renamed one final time to Cement City. Cement City was incorporated as a village in 1953.

== Government ==
Cement City is a home rule village. Per its charter, there is a village board with five elected members. Three board members are up for election every two years, with the top two vote-getters serve three terms while the third highest serves a two-year term.

== Education ==
Cement City is served by the Columbia School District.

== Geography ==
According to the United States Census Bureau, the village has a total area of 0.95 square miles (2.46 km^{2}), of which 0.91 square miles (2.36 km^{2}) is land and 0.04 square miles (0.10 km^{2}) is water.

== Demographics ==
Historical population
Census	Pop.	Note	%±
1960	471		—
1970	531		12.7%
1980	539		1.5%
1990	493		−8.5%
2000	452		−8.3%
2010	438		−3.1%
2020	424		−3.2%
U.S. Decennial Census

=== 2010 census ===
As of the census of 2010, there were 438 people, 174 households, and 115 families living in the village. The population density was 481.3 inhabitants per square mile (185.8/km^{2}). There were 187 housing units at an average density of 205.5 per square mile (79.3/km^{2}). The racial makeup of the village was 95.7% White, 0.7% Asian, 1.1% from other races, and 2.5% from two or more races. Hispanic or Latino of any race were 2.5% of the population.

There were 174 households, of which 33.3% had children under the age of 18 living with them, 47.7% were married couples living together, 12.1% had a female householder with no husband present, 6.3% had a male householder with no wife present, and 33.9% were non-families. 28.2% of all households were made up of individuals, and 8% had someone living alone who was 65 years of age or older. The average household size was 2.52 and the average family size was 2.97.

The median age in the village was 40.4 years. 24.7% of residents were under the age of 18; 6.6% were between the ages of 18 and 24; 23.7% were from 25 to 44; 30.9% were from 45 to 64; and 13.9% were 65 years of age or older. The gender makeup of the village was 50.9% male and 49.1% female.

=== 2000 census ===
As of the census of 2000, there were 452 people, 162 households, and 127 families living in the village. The population density was 514.6 inhabitants per square mile (198.7/km^{2}). There were 174 housing units at an average density of 198.1 per square mile (76.5/km^{2}). The racial makeup of the village was 97.57% White, 0.44% Native American, 0.22% Asian, and 1.77% from two or more races. Hispanic or Latino of any race were 1.99% of the population.

There were 162 households, out of which 35.8% had children under the age of 18 living with them, 61.7% were married couples living together, 10.5% had a female householder with no husband present, and 21.6% were non-families. 19.8% of all households were made up of individuals, and 8.6% had someone living alone who was 65 years of age or older. The average household size was 2.79 and the average family size was 3.19.

In the village, the population was spread out, with 30.5% under the age of 18, 5.8% from 18 to 24, 27.9% from 25 to 44, 22.8% from 45 to 64, and 13.1% who were 65 years of age or older. The median age was 36 years. For every 100 females, there were 101.8 males. For every 100 females age 18 and over, there were 109.3 males.

The median income for a household in the village was $40,500, and the median income for a family was $42,679. Males had a median income of $32,083 versus $23,125 for females. The per capita income for the village was $17,015. About 3.1% of families and 5.9% of the population were below the poverty line, including 10.6% of those under age 18 and 4.1% of those age 65 or over.
