= Hidden Lake Gardens =

Botanical garden and arboretum in Tipton, Michigan, United States

Coordinates: 42.0308°N 84.1066°W

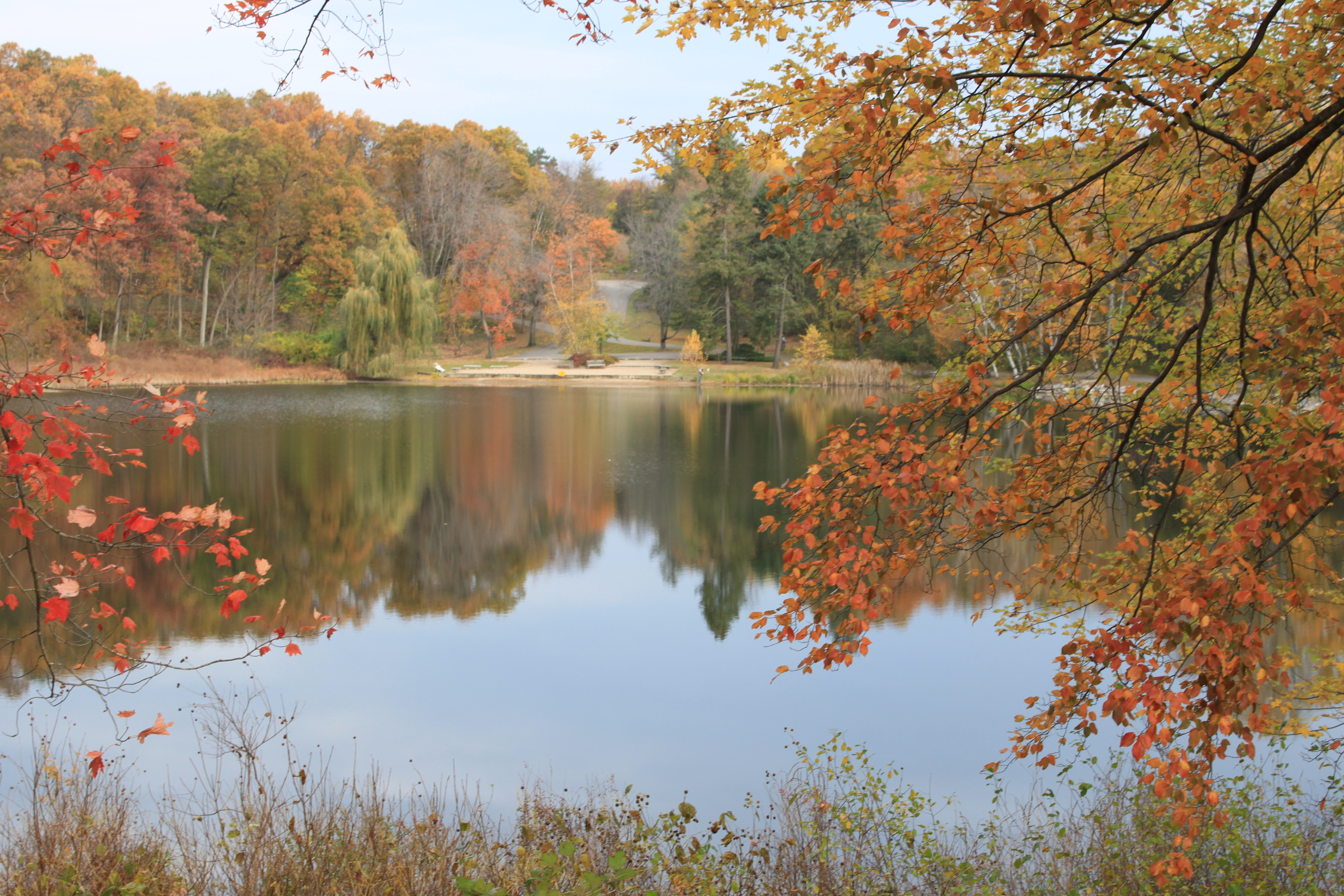
- Hidden Lake from Hosta Hillside
- Interactive map of Hidden Lake Gardens
- Website: Official website

Hidden Lake Gardens colloquially known as Hidden Lake 755 acres (3.06 km^{2}), is a botanical garden and an arboretum operated by Michigan State University situated in the Irish Hills of southeast Michigan. The Gardens are known for their large collection of native and nonnative trees, shrubs and flowers. HLG was given to Michigan State University by Harry Fee in 1945. Today it is visited by nearly 45,000 people annually.

== History ==
Hidden Lake Gardens began with Harry Fee, an Adrian businessman, purchased 200 acres (0.81 km^{2}) of land surrounding the "Hidden Lake" upon his retirement in 1926. He began with the intent to farm, but after realizing the land was not suitable for agriculture, he began to grow nursery stock instead. Fee decided that he did not want to compete with local nurseries during the Great Depression, so he began planting his trees and shrubs on the property. Fee sought to create picturesque landscape scenes, embellishing on the natural environment of his property to create a “series of pictures.” In 1945, Harry Fee would donate Hidden Lake Gardens to Michigan State University, and his generous Financial endowment continues to develop the gardens with additional land acquisitions, building construction, and educational programs and visitor services.

=== Arboretum ===
A large portion of Hidden Lake Gardens has been planted as an arboretum - a collection of trees and shrubs. Here visitors can view a wide variety of flowering crabapples, beeches, lindens, maples, oaks, lilacs and other trees and shrubs. A large collection of conifers is also included.

=== Harper Collection of Rare & Dwarf Conifers ===
This collection contains approximately 600 specimens of conifers. Selected cultivars of pines, firs, spruces, larches, hemlocks, false cypress, arborvitae and junipers are displayed in a 5-acre (20,000 m^{2}) garden setting. These rare conifers and slow growing cultivars are labeled so that they can be easily identified. Justin (Chub) Harper donated the collection to Hidden Lake Gardens in 1980 and Jack Wikle worked to establish the conifer collection at Hidden Lake Gardens.

=== Hosta Hillside ===
Situated along the shore of Hidden Lake, the hillside garden provides the perfect shaded setting for hosta. More than 700 cultivars are displayed here showing off the wide variety of foliage colors, textures, and sizes of hosta that are available. Other shade loving plants are intermingled with hosta along the cascading stream and pond. Daffodils provide an early spring display of flowers. In 1995 the garden was officially named and dedicated as the Ralph H. (Herb) and Dorothy Benedict Hosta Hillside.

=== Conservatory ===
The conservatory complex consists of more than 8,000 square feet (700 m^{2}) of gardens under glass. It has a tropical dome, arid dome, and temperate house displaying plants of ornamental and economic value from all around the world. Palm trees, bananas, bird-of-paradise, cactus, succulents, orchids, gardenia, and hibiscus thrive here. The adjoining lathhouse provides a shaded outdoor environment for ferns, begonias, caladiums and other plants from late May into October.

=== Bonsai Collection and Courtyard ===
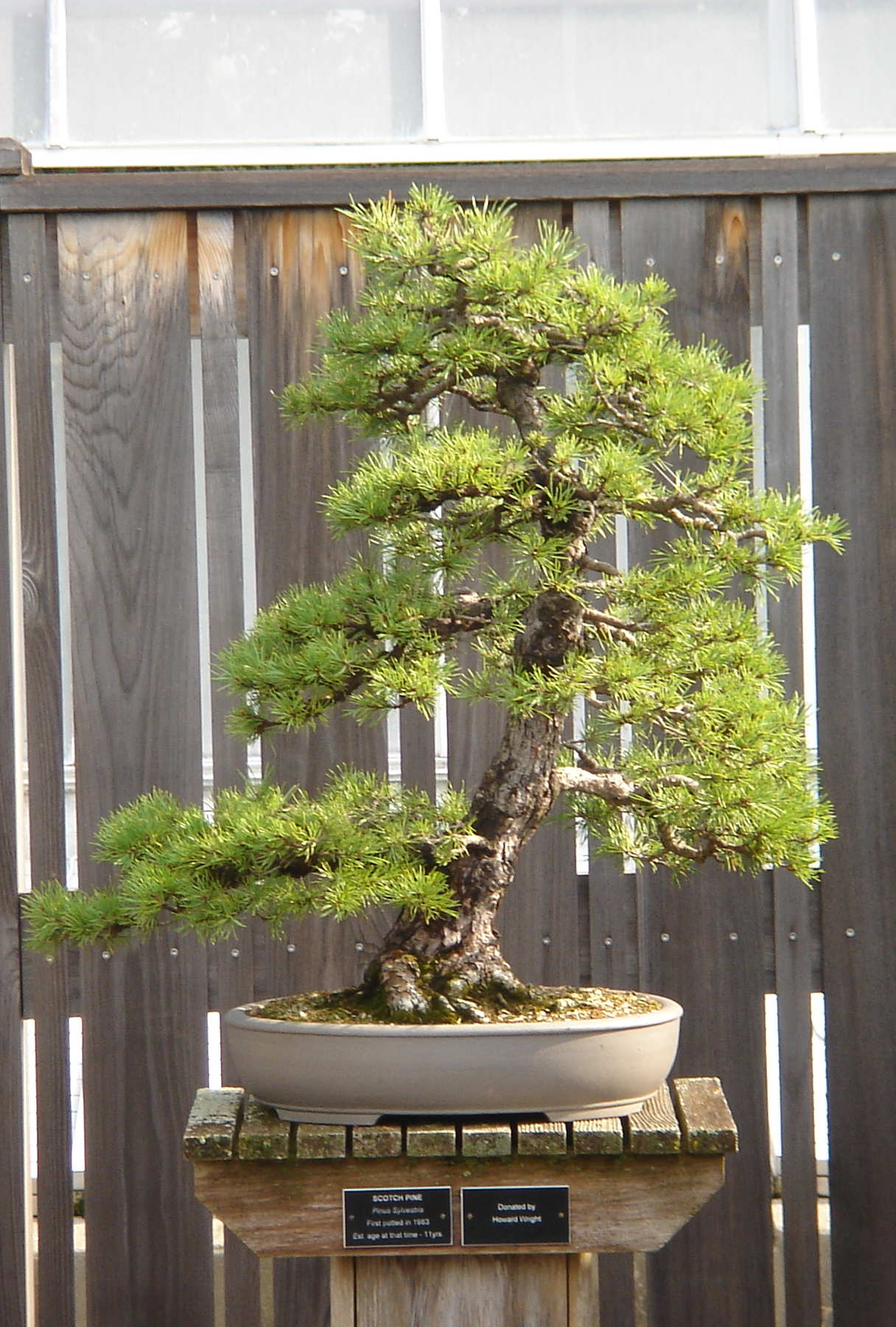
This Pine bonsai is more than 30 years old, and can be found in the Hidden Lake Gardens Collection

The Bonsai Courtyard of HLG is one of the largest collection of Bonsai on display in the Midwest, the collection was created in honor of and tended to by acclaimed bonsai expert Jack Wikle. The trees in the collection range from 40 to 100 years old, and many are native Michigan tree species, including maple, larch and tamarack. Around 20 of the Bonsai in the collection are displayed in the courtyard each season from May - October. The bonsai in the garden, are displayed on benches, giving the visitor an eye-to-eye view. The Elsie MacCready Memorial Bonsai Collection Endowment helps support the Bonsai collection.

=== Demonstration Garden ===
This area demonstrates how plants can be combined in attractive groupings. Annuals, perennials, ornamental grasses, conifers, flowering trees and shrubs are displayed here. The new award-winning All-America Selections of flowering annuals are also planted in this area.

=== Hidden Lake & Pond ===
A large portion of Hidden Lake Gardens remains as undeveloped natural areas. An auto road and six miles (10 km) of marked hiking trails allow visitors to explore the property which consists of oak-hickory forests, open fields, glacial kettleholes, and wetland areas. Wildflowers abound in spring and autumn brings fall foliage colors. White-tail deer, wild turkey, many songbirds and other wildlife can be seen on the property.

More than six miles (10 km) of marked hiking trails provide access to the woodland area, meadows, and the glacial kettlehole.

== Gallery ==
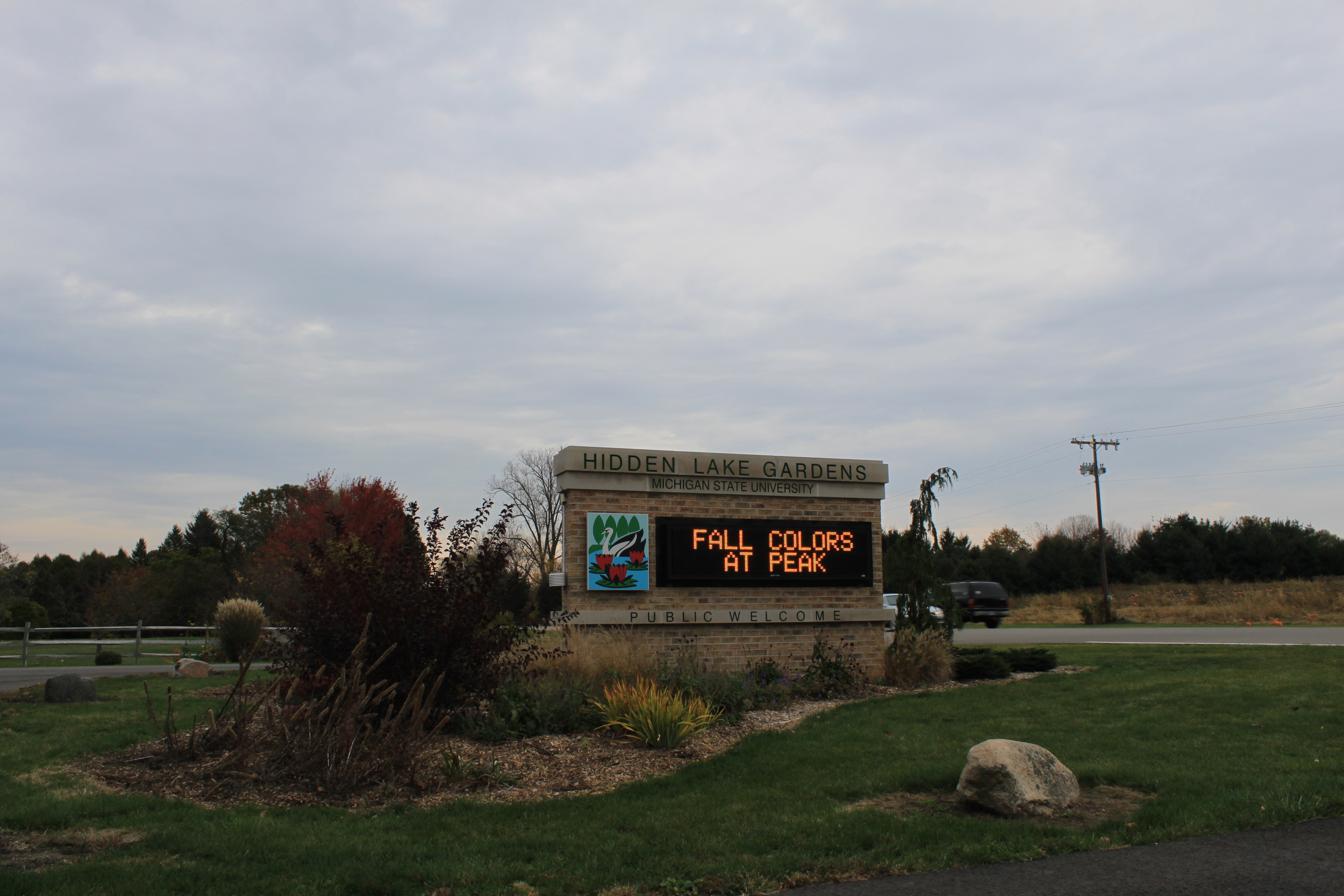
Entrance

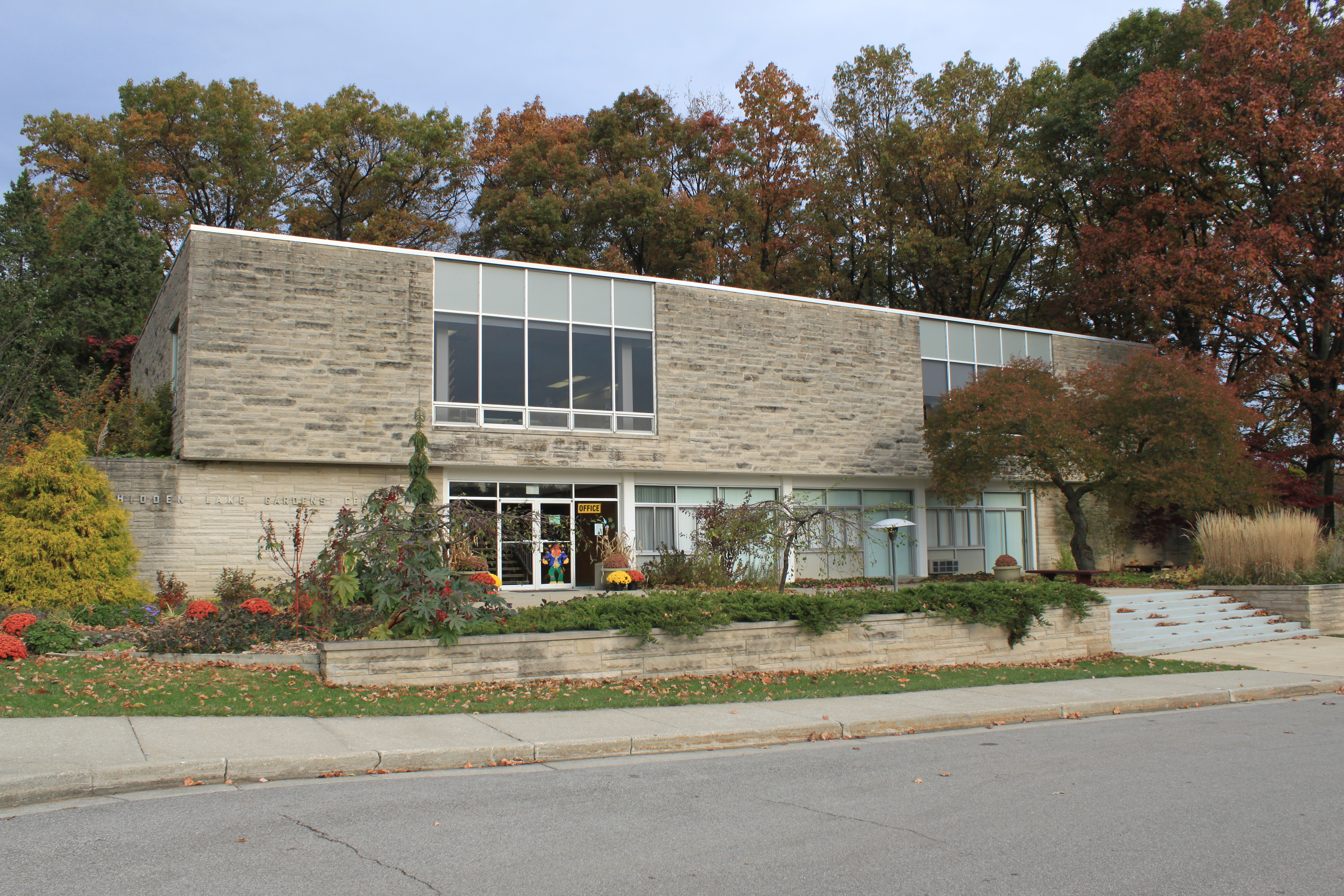
Visitor Center

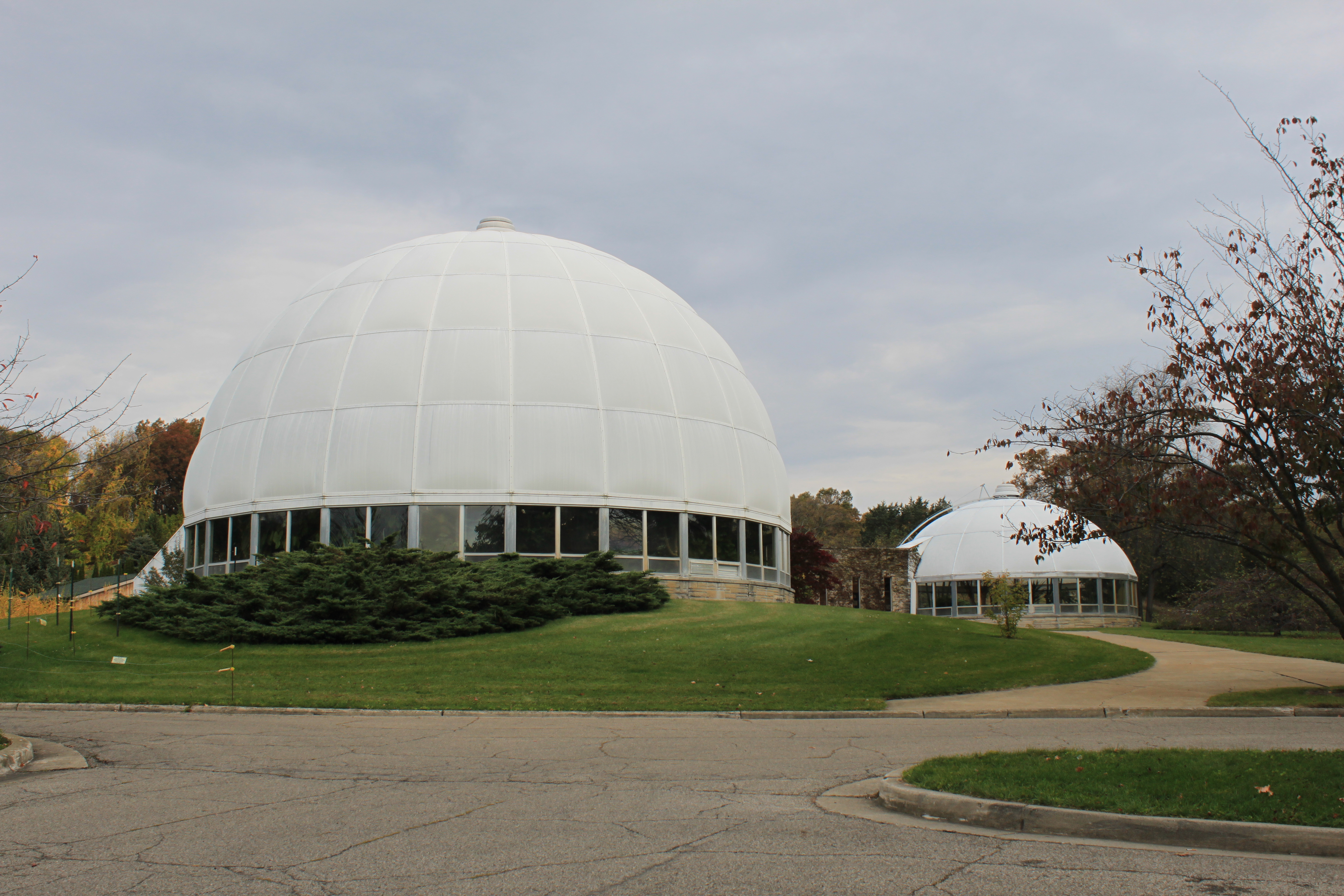
Plant Conservatory

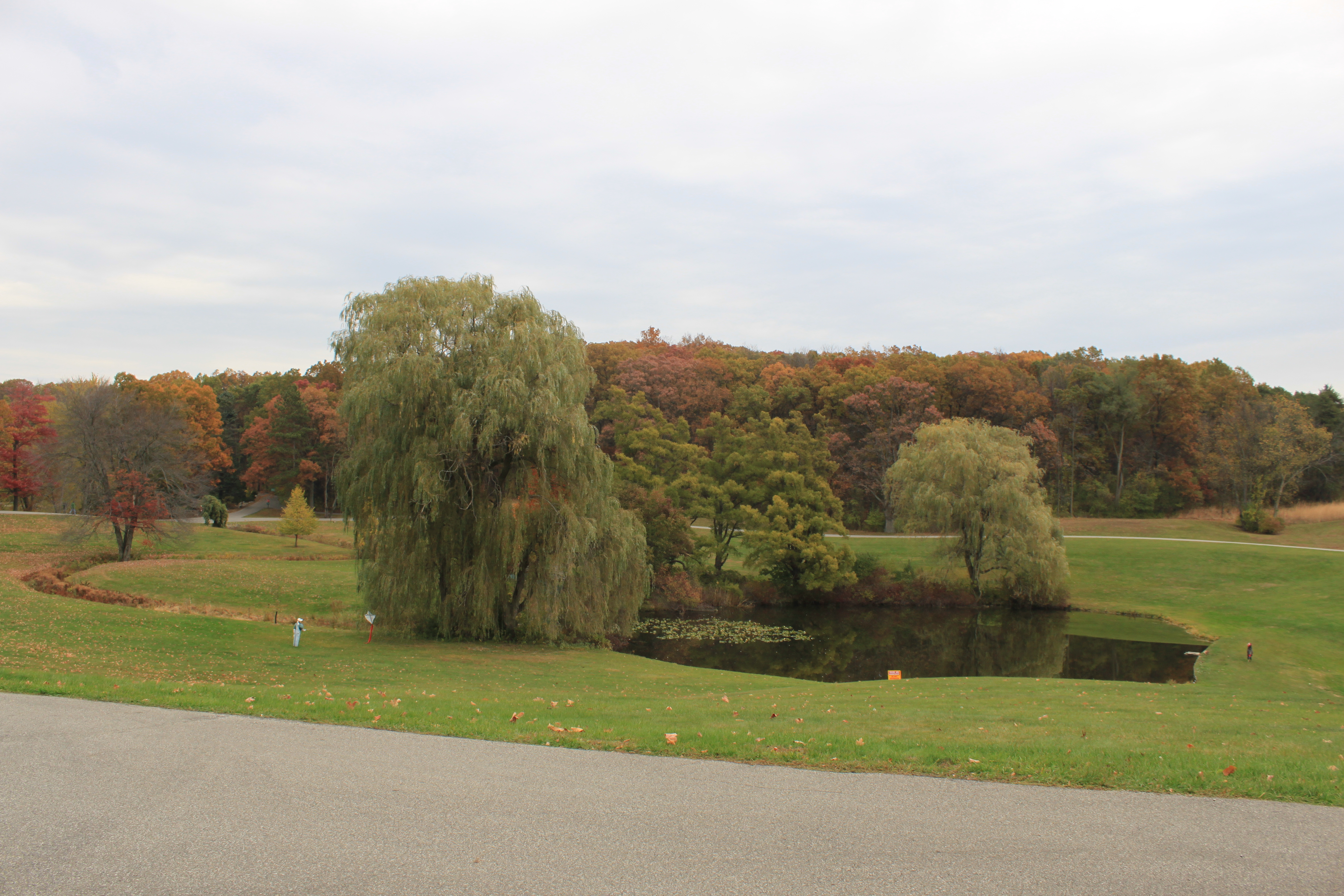
Pond

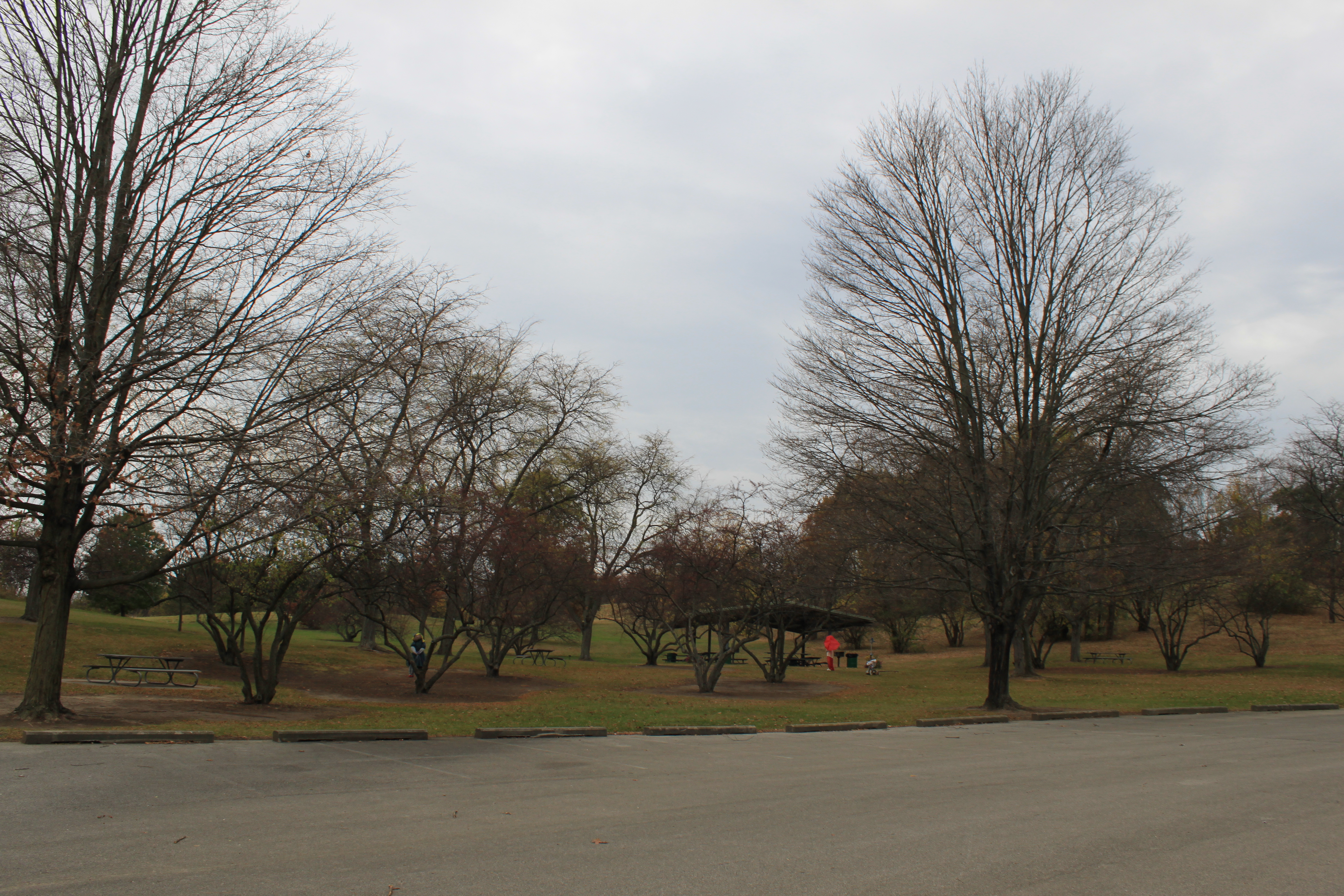
Picnic Area

== See also ==
- List of botanical gardens in the United States
