= National Register of Historic Places listings in Lenawee County, Michigan =

Location of Lenawee County in Michigan

The following is a list of National Register of Historic Places listings in Lenawee County, in the U.S. state of Michigan.

Broken off from the western portion of Monroe County in 1826, Lenawee County was the eighth county formally organized in the Michigan Territory (later the state of Michigan in 1837). With an estimated population at approximately 100,800, Lenawee County is ranked 21st in population of Michigan's 83 counties. Lenawee County currently has 43 listings on the National Register of Historic Places.

The first property listed was Walker Tavern on January 25, 1971. The most recent addition was the Blissfield Downtown Historic District on June 29, 2015. The 43 properties listed include nine historic districts, five churches, 17 houses, one cemetery, and one bridge, among other properties. One property, the Dr. Leonard Hall House in Hudson, has since been demolished but is still listed.
This National Park Service list is complete through NPS recent listings posted May 15, 2026.

Municipality	Listings
Adrian	11
Adrian Charter Township	1
Blissfield Township	3
Cambridge Township	6
Clinton Township	1
Fairfield Township	1
Franklin Township	2
Hudson	5
Macon Township	1
Raisin Charter Township	1
Tecumseh	11

== Current listings ==
	Name on the Register	Image	Date listed	Location	City or town	Description
1	Adrian Engine House No. 1	Adrian Engine House No. 1	August 21, 1989 (#89000789)	126 East Church Street; 41°53′50″N 84°02′11″W	Adrian	Constructed in 1855, the main feature of this fire station is a landmark tower that is one of the tallest structures in the city. It was the oldest continuously operating fire station in Michigan when it closed in 1987.
2	Adrian Public Library	Adrian Public Library	December 6, 1977 (#77000719)	110 East Church Street; 41°53′49″N 84°02′13″W	Adrian	The Adrian Public Library was built in 1909 with funding from the Andrew Carnegie Library Fund. It no longer functions as a library. Today, the building houses the Lenawee County Historical Museum.
3	Adrian Union Hall–Croswell Opera House	Adrian Union Hall–Croswell Opera House	April 18, 1985 (#85000839)	129 East Maumee Street; 41°53′55″N 84°02′09″W	Adrian	Built in 1866, it is recognized as the oldest continuously running theater in Michigan. Located in downtown Adrian, the property consists of the Croswell Opera House and the adjoining Adrian Union Hall.
4	Blissfield Downtown Historic District	Blissfield Downtown Historic District	June 29, 2015 (#15000364)	Bounded by Pearl, Jefferson, Giles, Adrian, and the Blissfield railroad line 41°49′55″N 83°51′46″W	Blissfield	Located in the downtown area of the village of Blissfield, the district contains 44 listed properties dating back to 1875 and consists of numerous architectures and mixed uses. It is the most recent addition to the county's listings on the National Register of Historic Places.
5	Brookside Cemetery	Brookside Cemetery	August 13, 1986 (#86001559)	North Union Street; 42°00′40″N 83°57′10″W	Tecumseh	The Brookside Cemetery dates back to 1853. A Civil War memorial was erected in the cemetery in 1882, and the stone-arch entrance was constructed in 1913. Many early settlers of the county are buried here.
6	David Carpenter House	David Carpenter House	November 20, 1979 (#79001163)	424 West Adrian Street; 41°50′08″N 83°52′18″W	Blissfield	Built around 1851 for David Carpenter, a local merchant and landowner, this large house has undergone a few additions and modifications over the years, and today, it serves as a restaurant known as the Hathaway House.
7	Dr. Samuel Catlin House	Dr. Samuel Catlin House	August 13, 1986 (#86001563)	213 East Chicago Boulevard; 42°00′16″N 83°56′32″W	Tecumseh	Located in downtown Tecumseh, this house was constructed in 1866 by renown local architect Salmon Crane, who built it for Dr. Catlin. The house went through various owners and today serves as an insurance office.
8	Civil War Memorial	Civil War Memorial	June 29, 1972 (#72000632)	Monument Park, E. Church St. 41°53′47″N 84°01′45″W	Adrian	Erected in 1870, this stone monument was once a column belonging to the Bank of Pennsylvania in Philadelphia. It was erected to commemorate soldiers from Adrian who died in the American Civil War.
9	Clark Memorial Hall	Clark Memorial Hall	January 14, 1985 (#85000097)	120–124 South Winter Street; 41°53′55″N 84°02′18″W	Adrian	Constructed in 1888 in downtown Adrian, the building served as the headquarters for the Adrian Lodge of the Odd Fellows. It was sold in 1986 and currently houses Maggard Razors.
10	Clinton Downtown Historic District	Clinton Downtown Historic District	April 27, 2010 (#10000220)	101–151 and 104–172 West Michigan Avenue; plus Memorial Park; 42°04′19″N 83°58′21″W	Clinton	Located around the intersection of Tecumseh/Jackson Street and U.S. Route 12, the district traces its origins to the village's founding in 1837. Designated in April 2010, it is the newest historic listing in Lenawee County.
11	Gov. Charles Croswell House	Gov. Charles Croswell House	March 16, 1972 (#72000633)	228 North Broad Street; 41°53′59″N 84°01′57″W	Adrian	Located near downtown Adrian, this house was built in the 1840s and purchased by Charles Croswell in the 1850s. He later went on to become governor of Michigan from 1877–1881. The house now serves as a museum.
12	Davenport Hotel	Davenport Hotel	May 4, 2007 (#07000383)	1280 U.S. Route 12; 42°03′47″N 84°07′01″W	Franklin Township	Built in the 1830s, the building has served a variety of purposes, ranging from a tavern, general store, post office, and stopoff for stagecoaches. Today, it serves as an inn known as the Bauer Manor.
13	Dennis-State Streets Historic District	Dennis-State Streets Historic District	April 14, 1975 (#75002170)	Bounded by Union, Dennis, State, and New York Central Railroad tracks 41°53′40″N 84°02′11″W	Adrian	This historic district contains 80 residential buildings comprising a number of architectural styles. Located in southern Adrian, it consists of two blocks of houses with most dating back around the 1860s, with the oldest built in 1835. A single property, the Bidwell Mansion, was added to the district as a boundary increase in 1979.
14	Downtown Adrian Commercial Historic District	Downtown Adrian Commercial Historic District	April 17, 1986 (#86000803)	Bounded by Toledo, Broad, Church, Maumee; Winter Street and the River Raisin; 41°53′55″N 84°02′12″W	Adrian	This district includes most of Adrian's downtown area. Most buildings are 2–3 story commercial businesses; the oldest buildings date back to 1865. The district encompasses a variety of architectural styles.
15	Musgrove Evans House	Musgrove Evans House	March 16, 1972 (#72000634)	409–411 East Logan Street; 42°00′20″N 83°56′23″W	Tecumseh	Built in 1826, this house is the oldest residential house in the county and among the oldest in the state. The house has been moved from its original location but has maintained its original appearance as a private dwelling.
16	First Presbyterian Church of Blissfield	First Presbyterian Church of Blissfield	September 3, 1971 (#71000403)	306 Franklin Street; 41°50′08″N 83°52′02″W	Blissfield	The church itself dates back to 1829, and the current building was built in 1849 by Reverend John Monteith. It is one of the oldest Presbyterian churches in the state and the oldest church in Blissfield.
17	Heman R. Goodrich House	Heman R. Goodrich House	January 22, 1992 (#91001996)	428 South Church Street; 41°51′01″N 84°21′19″W	Hudson	This unique structure is the largest of the two octagon houses in the county. Heman Goodrich, who built this house in 1861, was one of the earliest settlers in Hudson. Each facade is 15 feet (4.6 m) long.
18	Joseph E. Hall House	Joseph E. Hall House	August 13, 1986 (#86001566)	210 South Oneida Street; 42°00′07″N 83°56′30″W	Tecumseh	Built around 1870, this modest house was first owned by Joseph Hall, who was a local jeweler. It is one of the many valued properties designed by local architect Salmon Crane. The house remains privately owned.
19	Dr. Leonard Hall House	Dr. Leonard Hall House	October 2, 1978 (#78001503)	334 West Main Street; 41°51′17″N 84°21′25″W	Hudson	Built in 1847, it was one of the earliest homes in Hudson. The Hall family maintained ownership for many years until they sold it to the city, where it was torn down to make room for commercial development.
20	William Hayden House	William Hayden House	August 13, 1986 (#86001568)	108 West Pottawatamie Street; 42°00′09″N 83°56′45″W	Tecumseh	Built in 1860, this detailed Italianate villa was built by local miller William Hayden. He purchased and operated the Globe Flour Mill, which was the backbone of Tecumseh's economy in the late-nineteenth century.
21	George B. and Amanda Bradish Horton Farmstead	George B. and Amanda Bradish Horton Farmstead	February 1, 2007 (#06001333)	4650 West Horton Road; 41°47′58″N 84°06′42″W	Fairfield Township	Covering 40 acres (16 hectares) in rural Fairfield, it was first settled in 1888. Built with Queen Anne Style, the farmhouse remains privately owned. There are several other buildings on the property as well.
22	Hudson Downtown Historic District	Hudson Downtown Historic District	December 24, 1974 (#74000992)	Main between Howard and Market; Church between Seward and Railroad; 41°51′18″N 84°21′20″W	Hudson	This commercial center dates back to 1837 with the arrival of the railways, and Hudson thrived as a trading center from 1854–1891. Most of the buildings maintain their original appearance and serve as storefronts.
23	Irish Hills Towers	Irish Hills Towers	May 2, 2007 (#07000380)	8433 West U.S. Route 12; 42°03′22″N 84°09′23″W	Cambridge Township	Constructed in 1924, the two wooden observation tourist towers are along U.S. Route 12 in the Irish Hills region in the northernmost portion of the county. They have been closed to the public since 2000.
24	Jackson Branch Bridge No. 15	Jackson Branch Bridge No. 15	December 4, 2001 (#01000572)	Michigan Southern Railway tracks over the River Raisin; 41°56′35″N 83°56′46″W	Raisin Charter Township	Built in 1896, this 254-foot-10 1/2-inch (77.686 m) long truss bridge carries a single line over the River Raisin. It is an active railroad, and Southern Michigan Railroad Society passenger trains cross it. It is the county's only bridge on the National Register.
25	John W. and Erena Alexander Rogers Keeney Farm	John W. and Erena Alexander Rogers Keeney Farm	September 24, 2001 (#01001020)	5300 Monroe Street; 42°01′26″N 84°05′19″W	Franklin Township	Consisting of 256 acres (104 hectares) along M-50 in rural Franklin Township, this apple orchard was settled and owned by the Keeney family since 1835. The current farmhouse was constructed between 1865–1868.
26	George J. Kempf House	George J. Kempf House	August 13, 1986 (#86001570)	212 East Kilbuck; 42°00′04″N 83°56′33″W	Tecumseh	Constructed in 1905 for local carpenter George Kempf, this two-story house is a well-preserved mix between Queen Anne and Colonial Revival architecture. Kempf and his brother built many houses in Tecumseh.
27	Lenawee County Courthouse	Lenawee County Courthouse	February 28, 1991 (#91000212)	309 North Main Street; 41°54′07″N 84°02′06″W	Adrian	When the county seat was moved from Tecumseh to Adrian in 1837, the courthouse was built but burned down in 1852. The current Romanesque courthouse was completed in 1885 and stands near downtown Adrian.
28	Lorenzo and Ruth Wells Palmer House	Lorenzo and Ruth Wells Palmer House	October 8, 2001 (#01001070)	760 Maple Grove Avenue; 41°51′52″N 84°20′58″W	Hudson	Built in 1845, this Greek Revival house was built for Connecticut native Lorenzo Palmer in northeast Hudson when he moved to Michigan. The house has retained most of its original characteristics.
29	John Pennington–Henry Ford House	John Pennington–Henry Ford House	December 31, 1974 (#74000993)	8281 Clinton Macon Road; 42°03′58″N 83°52′04″W	Macon Township	Built around 1845 by John and Hannah Pennington, the property itself was settled much earlier. Henry Ford purchased and restored the property in the 1930s. Ford later sold the property, and it remains privately owned.
30	Raisin Valley Friends Meetinghouse	Raisin Valley Friends Meetinghouse	April 28, 1982 (#82002847)	3552 North Adrian Highway; 41°56′17″N 84°00′21″W	Adrian Charter Township	Currently known as the Raisin Valley Friends Church, it was constructed in 1835 by Quaker settlers. It is recognized as the second oldest operating church building in the state of Michigan.
31	Saint Elizabeth's Church	Saint Elizabeth's Church	August 13, 1986 (#86001572)	302 East Chicago Boulevard; 42°00′14″N 83°56′30″W	Tecumseh	Recognized as the first Catholic church in Tecumseh, it was built in 1913. The expanding church moved to a new location in 1951. In 1982, the city purchased the building for the Historical Society of Tecumseh.
32	Saint Joseph Church and Shrine	Saint Joseph Church and Shrine	May 4, 2007 (#07000382)	8742 U.S. Route 12; 42°03′24″N 84°09′51″W	Cambridge Township	Located along U.S. Route 12 in the Irish Hills region, this stone church was constructed in 1854 and is one of the oldest operating churches in the region. The property has undergone numerous additions over the years.
33	St. John's Lutheran Church	St. John's Lutheran Church	December 27, 1984 (#84000544)	121 South Locust Street; 41°53′46″N 84°01′50″W	Adrian	This church was built in 1861 in part due to a surge in German immigrants. It is notable as the oldest Greek Revival Lutheran church building in Michigan. It continues to serve Lutherans in the Adrian area.
34	St. Mary of Good Counsel Catholic Church	St. Mary of Good Counsel Catholic Church	February 24, 1983 (#83000883)	320 Division Street; 41°53′41″N 84°02′00″W	Adrian	The church is significant as the home of Adrian's oldest Catholic congregation, which dates back to 1852. This church building was completed in 1871 and continues to serve the Catholic community.
35	St. Michael and All Angels' Episcopal Church and Cambridge Township Cemetery	St. Michael and All Angels' Episcopal Church and Cambridge Township Cemetery	February 4, 2004 (#03001550)	11646 Old Monroe Pike; 42°03′19″N 84°13′12″W	Cambridge Township	The district, located near the junction of M-50 and U.S. Route 12, consists of a church and cemetery. The current church building was constructed in 1855. The cemetery is located next to the church.
36	G.P. Sparks House	G.P. Sparks House	August 13, 1986 (#86001571)	509 East Logan Street; 42°00′21″N 83°56′16″W	Tecumseh	Built in 1883, this Victorian house was built for sewing machine merchant G. P. Sparks. It is one of the most significant Upright and Wing houses in Tecumseh. It was once attached to a larger farm that no longer exists.
37	Tecumseh Downtown Historic District	Tecumseh Downtown Historic District	April 17, 1986 (#86000805)	East and West Chicago Boulevard and South Evans Street; 42°00′14″N 83°56′43″W	Tecumseh	Comprising the historic commercial district of Tecumseh, the area grew when railways came through in the 1830s but development later halted when Tecumseh lost the county seat and the railway closed.
38	Tecumseh Historic District	Tecumseh Historic District	September 13, 1984 (#84001796)	West Chicago Boulevard and Union Street; also 704–710 West Chicago Boulevard; 42°00′15″N 83°57′04″W	Tecumseh	This residential district dates back to 1830 and includes a number of architectural styles. Located near downtown Tecumseh, it was designated in 1984 and officially expanded to include more Chicago Boulevard properties on May 18, 1990.
39	Samuel W. Temple House	Samuel W. Temple House	August 13, 1986 (#86001561)	115 West Shawnee Street; 42°00′25″N 83°56′48″W	Tecumseh	Built around 1866, Samuel Temple used the property for his lumber yard. It is one of the best examples of Italianate architecture in Tecumseh, although the house is currently vacant and unmaintained.
40	Gamaliel Thompson House	Gamaliel Thompson House	April 3, 1975 (#75000952)	101 Summit Street; 41°51′06″N 84°21′14″W	Hudson	Built for local banker Gamaliel Thompson in 1890, it is one of the finest examples of Queen Anne style architecture in the United States in Michigan. The house now serves as a hall for special events.
41	Murray D. Van Wagoner Memorial Bridge	Murray D. Van Wagoner Memorial Bridge	January 27, 2000 (#99001731)	MI 156 over Silver Cr. 41°42′45″N 84°12′41″W	Morenci	Built in 1935 to carry the Taft Memorial Highway (now M-156) over Silver Creek in Morenci.
42	S. Walker's Hotel	S. Walker's Hotel	May 2, 2007 (#07000381)	11705 U.S. Route 12; 42°03′32″N 84°13′18″W	Cambridge Township	
43	Walker Tavern	Walker Tavern	January 25, 1971 (#71000404)	11710 U.S. Route 12; 42°03′36″N 84°13′30″W	Cambridge Township	Originally built in 1832 as a farmhouse, it was converted into an inn and tavern in 1843. In 1921, it was restored and converted into a museum, and in 1965, it became part of the Cambridge Junction Historic State Park.
44	Nathaniel S. Wheeler House	Nathaniel S. Wheeler House	February 24, 1975 (#75000953)	7075 M-50; 42°01′26″N 84°07′55″W	Cambridge Township	This cobblestone home was built by one of Cambridge Township's earliest settlers, Nathaniel Wheeler, in 1845. The house has been passed through various owners but has undergone little changes in appearance.

== See also ==
- List of Michigan State Historic Sites in Lenawee County, Michigan
- List of National Historic Landmarks in Michigan
- National Register of Historic Places listings in Michigan
- Listings in neighboring counties: Fulton (OH), Hillsdale, Jackson, Lucas (OH), Monroe, Washtenaw
