= Temple House =

Temple House may refer to:

- Temple House Manor and Castle, Ballinacarrow on the outskirts of Ballymote in south County Sligo, Ireland
- Temple House (Pine Bluff, Arkansas), listed on the US National Register of Historic Places (NRHP)
- Temple Mansion, Industry, California, listed on the NRHP in California
- The Temple House, an event venue and former residence in South Beach, Miami, Florida
- John Roland Temple House, Hartwell, Georgia, listed on the NRHP in Georgia
- Temple-Skelton House, Hartwell, Georgia, listed on the NRHP in Georgia
- Temple House, London, Grade II listed office building
- Temple, Marcellus Luther and Julia Protzman, House, Osceola, Iowa, listed on the NRHP in Iowa
- Joseph Temple House, Reading, Massachusetts, NRHP-listed
- Mark Temple House, Reading, Massachusetts, NRHP-listed
- Samuel W. Temple House, Tecumseh, Michigan, NRHP-listed
- Temple-Webster-Stoner House, Romansville, Pennsylvania, NRHP-listed
- Henry G. Temple House, Diboll, Texas, listed on the NRHP in Texas
- Lands of Templehouse, an estate near Dunlop, East Ayrshire, Scotland

== See also ==
- Temple (disambiguation)
- House temple (disambiguation)
- Temple Hall, Leesburg, Virginia, NRHP-listed
