= Tecumseh Historic District =

Tecumseh Historic District may refer to the following properties on the National Register of Historic Places:

- Tecumseh Historic District (Tecumseh, Nebraska), listed in Johnson County, Nebraska

Michigan

- Tecumseh Downtown Historic District, listed in Lenawee County
- Tecumseh Historic District (Tecumseh, Michigan), listed in Lenawee County
