= Mark Temple =

Mark Temple may refer to:

- Mark Temple (American football)
- Mark Temple (engineer)

== See also ==
- Mark Temple House, a historic house in Reading, Massachusetts
