= Brookside Cemetery =

Brookside Cemetery in Winnipeg, Manitoba holds more than 6500 servicemen and women, includes 470 war graves. The Stone of Remembrance, which was unveiled in 1960 by the Commonwealth War Graves Commission honours the sailors, soldiers and airmen of the Commonwealth who served in both wars and who are buried in Canada.

Brookside Cemetery may also refer to:

- Brookside Cemetery (Tecumseh, Michigan), listed on the National Register of Historic Places in Lenawee County, Michigan
- Brookside Cemetery (Dayton, Oregon), listed on the National Register of Historic Places in Yamhill County, Oregon
- Brookside Cemetery, Englewood
