= Sparks House =

Sparks House may refer to:

== In the United States ==
(by state then city)

- James Sparks House, National Register of Historic Places-listed in Fort Smith, Arkansas
- Walter Sparks House, NRHP-listed in American Falls, Idaho
- Treadwell-Sparks House, NRHP-listed in Cambridge, Massachusetts
- Sparks-Anderson House, NRHP-listed in Oshtemo Township, Michigan
- G. P. Sparks House, NRHP-listed in Tecumseh, Michigan
- James Dickson House, also known as "Sparks House", NRHP-listed in Perry County, Tennessee

== See also ==
- Sparkhouse: BBC drama
- Sparks Steak House: restaurant in New York City
