= Andy Latham =

British motorsport engineer

- Born: Andrew Latham; 1978 or 1979 (age 47–48)
- Employer: Skyral
- Known for: Formula One race engineer
- Title: Head of product

Andy Latham (born 1978/1979) is a British Formula One and motorsport engineer. He is currently working as head of product for British defence technology company Skyral. He previously spent 21 years at McLaren, including serving as race engineer to Lewis Hamilton.

== Career ==
Latham studied engineering at the University of Oxford, graduating with a Master of Engineering degree. He joined McLaren in 2000 as a vehicle dynamics engineer, working on simulation, set-up development and performance analysis. He subsequently moved into trackside roles, becoming assistant test engineer and later assistant race engineer.

From 2005 to 2006, Latham served as assistant race engineer to Kimi Räikkönen, contributing to race operations and performance development during McLaren's championship-contending seasons. In 2007 he worked as assistant race engineer to Fernando Alonso during the Spaniard's single season with the team.

Latham was promoted to race engineer in 2010, working with Lewis Hamilton through to the end of the 2012 season. In this role he oversaw car set-up and driver-engineering liaison during multiple race-winning campaigns. He left the position after the 2012 Italian Grand Prix to begin paternity leave and was replaced by Mark Temple.

Returning to McLaren at the start of the 2013 season, Latham became Strategy Team Leader at McLaren, helping shape race strategy processes and decision support tools before transitioning to McLaren Applied Technologies in 2015 as Chief Engineer, Analytics. There he focused on applying motorsport simulation, modelling and data-analysis methodologies to wider technology and industrial projects. In 2021, Latham moved into product and decision-support roles in the technology sector, continuing to specialise in data-driven performance engineering and analytical software development.
