= Dr. Samuel Catlin House =

Historic house in Michigan, United States

- U.S. National Register of Historic Places
- Michigan State Historic Site
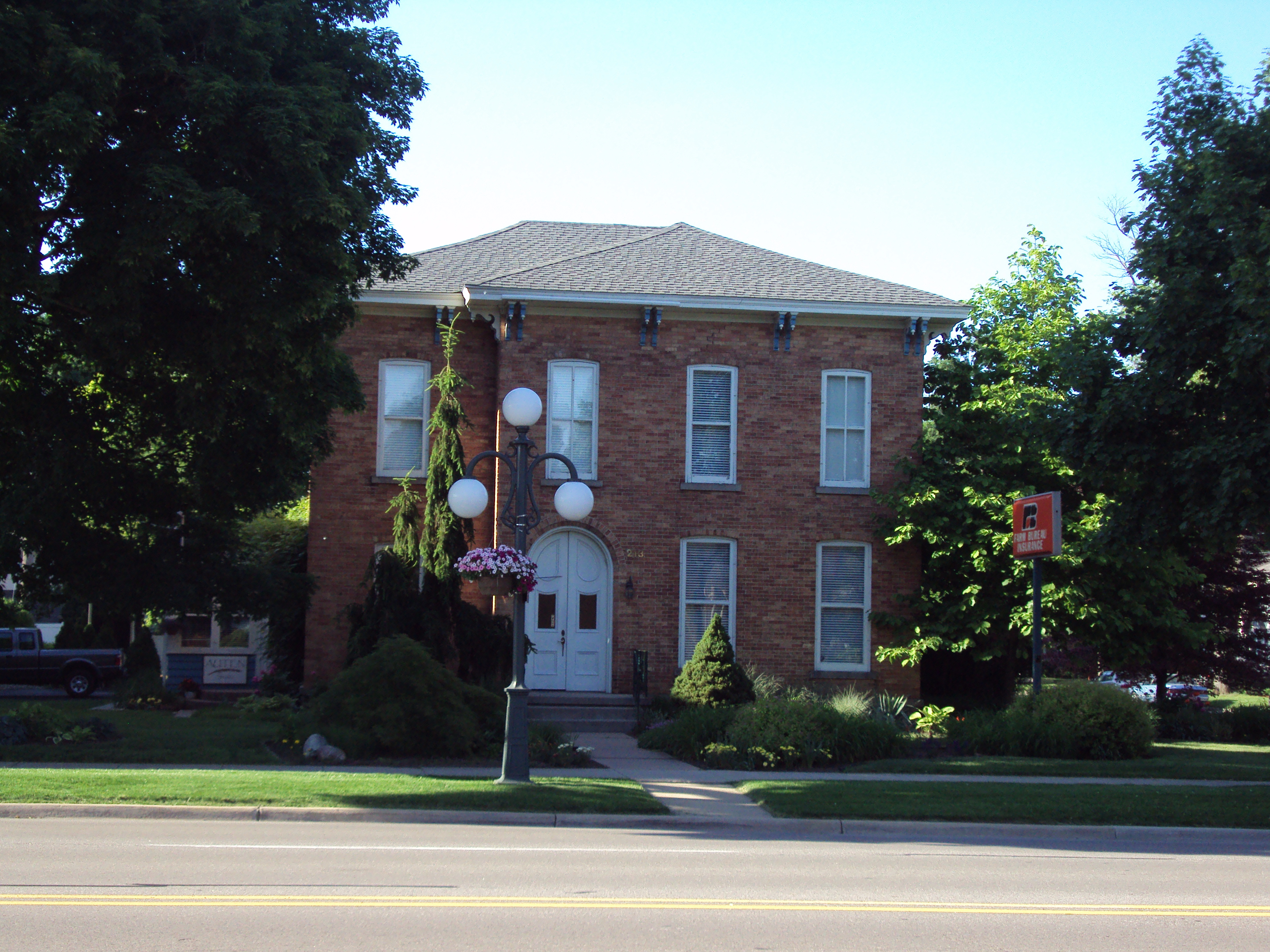

- Location within Michigan Location within the United States
- Interactive map
- Location: 213 East Chicago Blvd. Tecumseh, Michigan
- Coordinates: 42°00′16″N 83°56′32″W
- Built: 1866–1867
- Architect: Salmon Crane
- Architectural style: Italianate
- MPS: Tecumseh MRA
- NRHP reference No.: 86001563
- Added to NRHP: August 13, 1986

The Dr. Samuel Catlin House is a former residence located at 213 East Chicago Boulevard (M-50) in downtown Tecumseh, Michigan, United States. It was listed as a Michigan State Historic Site and added to the National Register of Historic Places on August 13, 1986. It is located across the street from Saint Elizabeth's Church and down the street from (but not included in) the Tecumseh Downtown Historic District.

== History ==
This house was built in 1866–1867 by renowned architect Salmon Crane, who built many of the original structures in the Tecumseh area. After it was finished, it served as the residence to Dr. Samuel Catlin and his wife Rebecca, who first moved to the area in 1856. They lived in the house until 1881, when they sold it to George and Adeline Tiffany, who lived there for the next 30 years. Today, the structure serves as a Farm Bureau insurance office.

== Description ==
The house is a simple, red-brick cube structure built in Italianate architecture. It is two stories tall, with a hip roof and a broad, arched entryway with paneled double doors. A side wing is slightly set back from the main mass. The wide eaves are supported by paired, acorn-pendent brackets. The house has tall narrow windows with segmental-arch caps.
