= House church (disambiguation) =

House church may refer to:

- British New Church Movement, a neocharismatic evangelical Christian movement in the United Kingdom, originally known as the "house church movement."
- House church, an informal term for a group of Christians gathering regularly or spontaneously in a home or on grounds not normally used for worship services, instead of a building dedicated to the purpose
- House church (China), an unregistered Christian church in the People's Republic of China, which operate independently of the government-run religious establishments
- House church (Russia), a church restricted to members of a certain household or institution

== See also ==
- House temple (disambiguation)
