= S. Walker's Hotel =

- Walker's, S., Hotel
- U.S. National Register of Historic Places
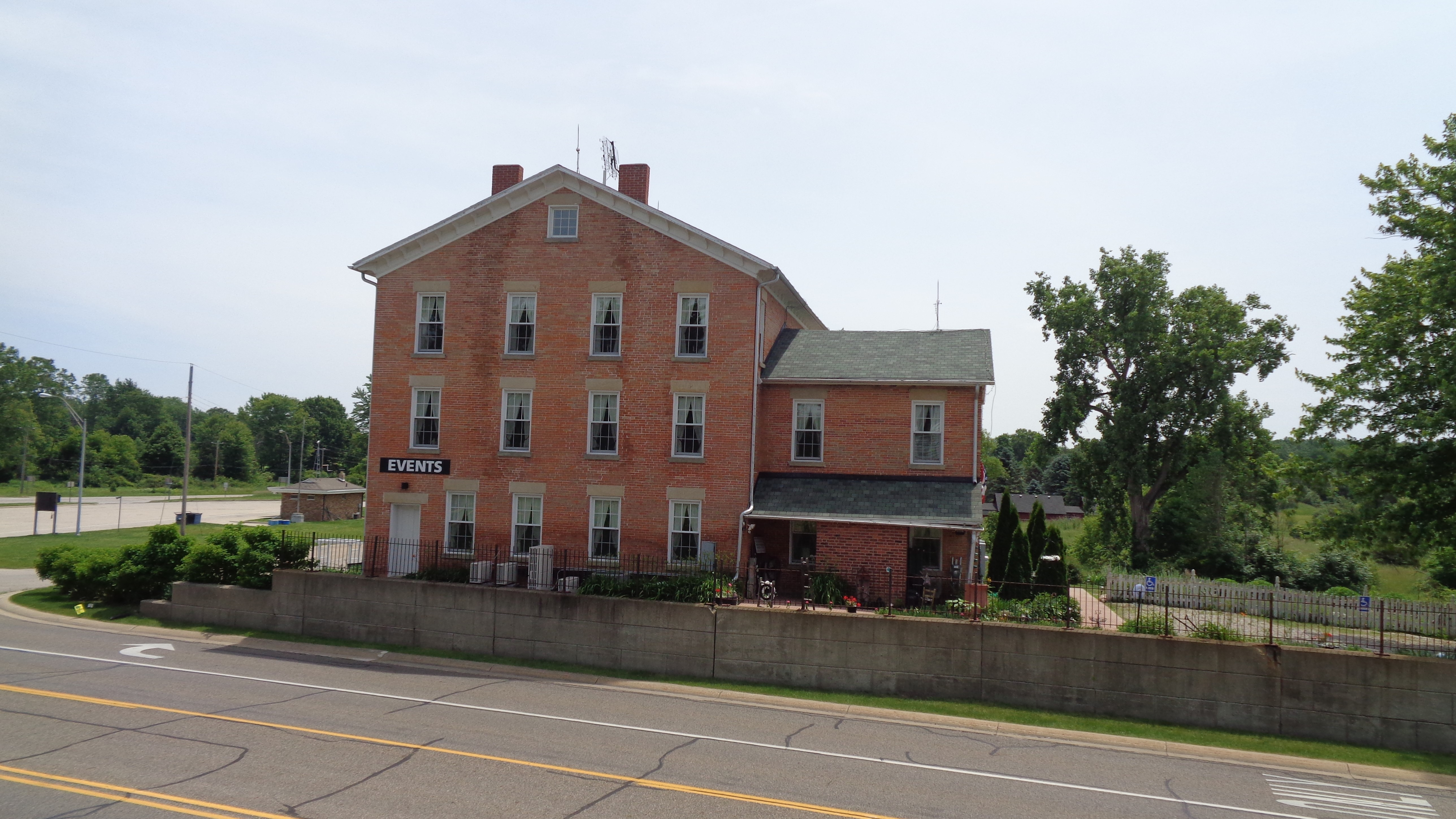
- The Brick Walker Tavern in 2019

- Location within Michigan Location within the United States
- Interactive map showing the location for S. Walker’s Hotel
- Location: 11705 US-12, Cambridge Township, Michigan
- Coordinates: 42°3′32″N 84°13′18″W
- Area: 2.2 acres (0.89 ha)
- Built: 1853
- Architectural style: Greek Revival, Italianate
- NRHP reference No.: 07000381
- Added to NRHP: May 2, 2007

S. Walker's Hotel, also known as the Brick Walker Tavern, is a former hotel/tavern located at 11705 US-12 in Cambridge Township, Michigan. It was listed on the National Register of Historic Places in 2007. The hotel is notable for its brick exterior and three-story height - most other surviving early brick tavern/hotel buildings in Michigan are two-story frame structures. The building is currently operated as an event space known as the "Brick Walker Tavern."

== History ==
Sylvester and Lucy Walker were married in New Berlin, New York in 1816. By the mid-1830s, they had moved to Cooperstown, New York where they ran the Union Hall hotel. In about 1838, they moved to Michigan and likely leased the inn and tavern located across the road from this site from the owner, Calvin Snell. At the time, traffic along what was then called the Chicago Road was increasing, as it was the primary route between Detroit and Chicago. In 1842, the Walkers purchased the tavern, renaming it the Walker Tavern. The Walkers continued to run the older, frame tavern until 1853. However, in that year, Walker augmented his business by beginning construction on a new brick hotel at the present site. The Walker Tavern still stands today.

The new building was completed in late 1852 and it had a separate dining room and taproom on the first floor, guest rooms on the second floor, and a ballroom on the third floor. The Walkers continued to own both the frame Walker Tavern and the new hotel until 1863. Although the Chicago Road saw a decrease in traffic due to the construction of railroad lines in southern Michigan, the Walkers were likely able to stay in business thanks to their taproom, which catered to residents. In 1859, Walker sold the hotel to Silas Giles of Detroit but remained living in the hotel until he died in 1868.

Silas Giles sold the hotel to William Graves and George Curtis in 1863, who in turn sold it to Lyman Nearing later that same year. Lyman Nearing was born in 1817 in Lafayette, New York, and moved to Michigan just before purchasing the hotel. In 1864, he married Jane Turner, and the couple moved into the hotel. In 1865, they changed the name to the Nearing House and owned and managed the establishment until 1887, when the mortgage was foreclosed and he lost the hotel. Walker B. Sherman purchased the hotel at the sheriff's sale, and after he died in 1892, it was sold to Edwin B. Culver. The hotel was sold again in 1898 to Frank Fitzgerald, and in 1900 to George Burton. Burton owned and managed the hotel until 1922 but with mixed success.

In 1922, Frederick Hewitt purchased the property. Hewitt was born in England in 1876, and emigrated to Canada in 1891. He eventually received a degree in theology from Huron College in 1899, and took a position at St. Thomas Episcopal Church in Detroit, staying until 1905. Over the next decade, he took positions at various churches throughout Michigan. Hewitt was charismatic and a skilled orator, and made numerous friends; among them were Alex J. Groesbeck, who went on to become governor of Michigan, and auto magnate Henry Ford.

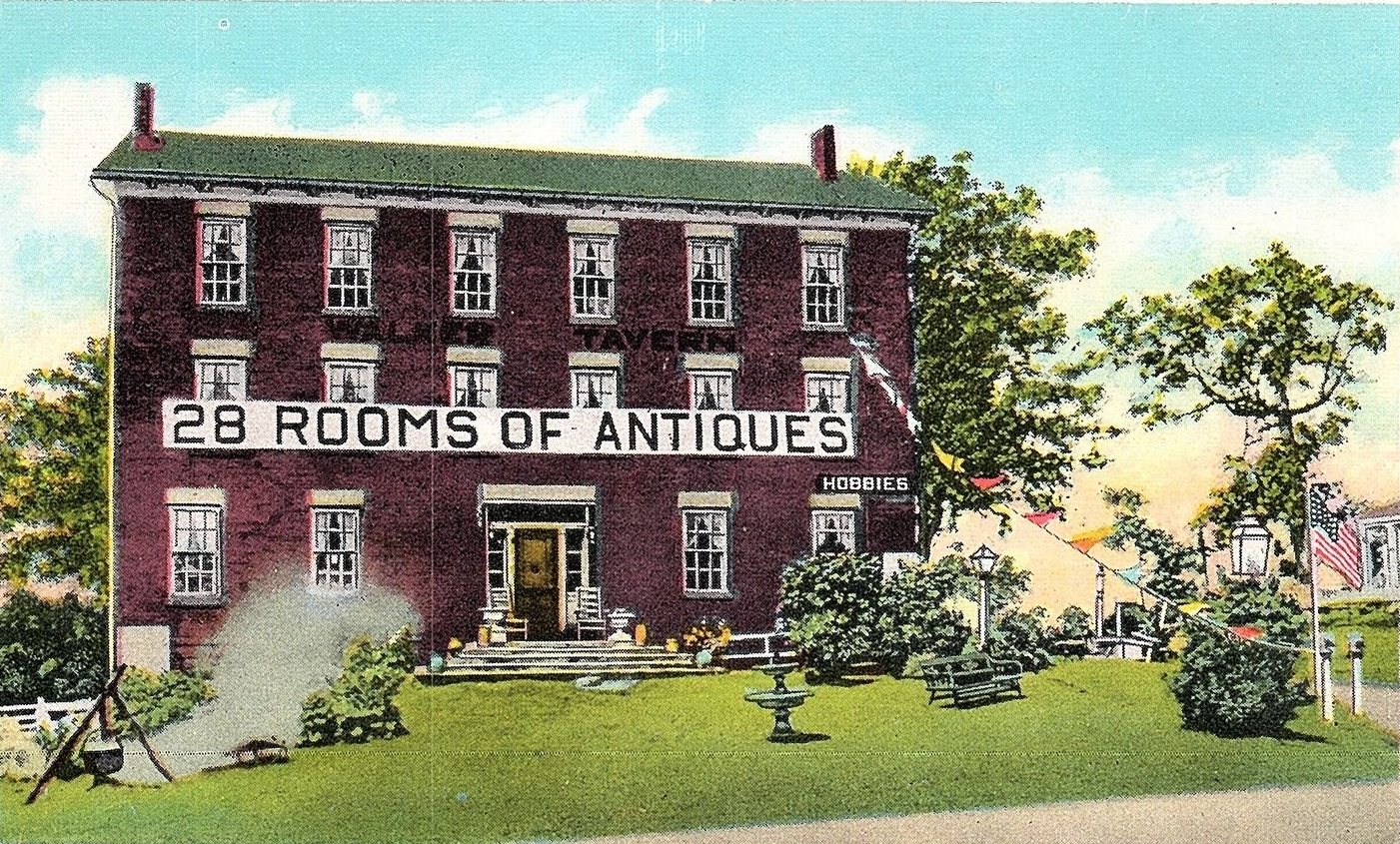
The Tavern in use as an antique store, c. 1948

In the early 1920s, Hewitt's interests began to turn toward antiques. He was familiar with the Irish Hills area, having served a stint at St. Peter's Episcopal Church in Tecumseh. In 1920, he purchased a cottage at Evans Lake and opened an antique shop. In 1922, he purchased both the wooden Walker Tavern and Walker's Hotel. He refurbished the hotel and continued to rent out rooms and run a restaurant on the premises, but he also added an antique shop to the building. In 1926, Chicago Road had been paved, drawing an influx of tourists, and Hewitt realized that the antiques business was a sufficient money-maker. He ceased providing means and rooms and turned to antiques full-time. Here, his influential friends paid off, as both Alex Groesbeck and Henry Ford visited the antique store regularly, with the latter purchasing many items for his Greenfield Village museum. Other clients included University of Michigan football coach Fielding Yost (as well as other UM faculty), and the wife of the poet Robert Frost.

Hewitt's antique business was so successful that he opened two more shops, one in St. Augustine, Florida, in 1924, and one in Chicago in 1929. He then purchased the Springville Inn a few miles from the hotel. In 1930, he built a home near the wooden Walker Tavern, and in 1931 opened the entire Brick Tavern to the public as a combination antique shop and museum. In 1934, due to the Great Depression, Hewitt sold his subsidiary stores and concentrated on managing the Springville Inn. He turned over the management of the wooden tavern to his daughter and her husband, Forest Keith, and turned over the brick hotel to his son, James, to run as an antique shop.

In 1965, the Hewitts sold the wooden tavern to the state of Michigan, and in 1967 sold the brick hotel to antique dealers Nells and Joseph Schmidt. Since that time, the building has been operated by various people as an antique shop. In the mid-2000s, it was purchased by Tom Lee, who restored it to operate as a wedding and event center known as the Brick Walker Tavern.

== Description ==
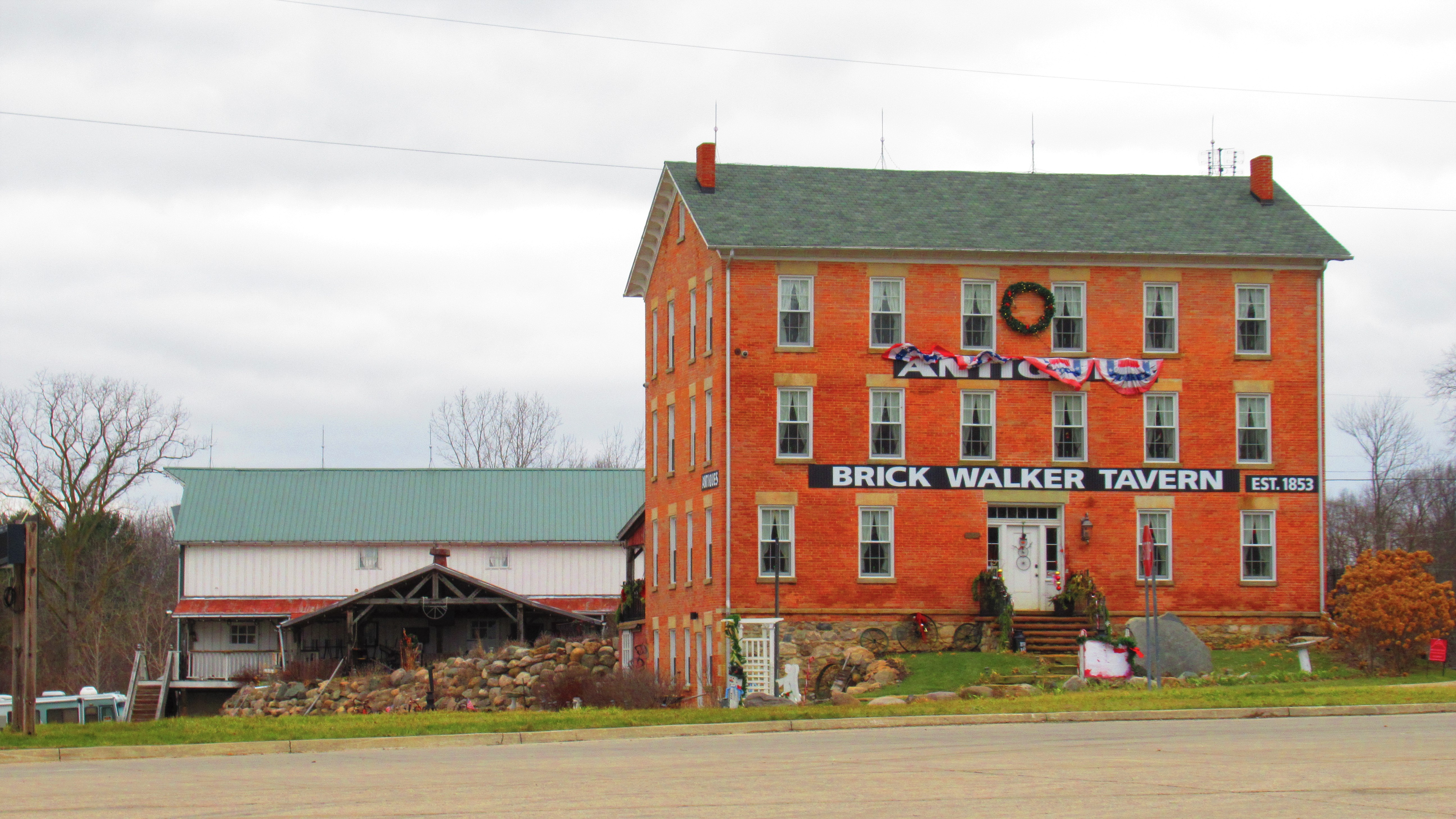
Front side facing M-50 in December 2019

S. Walker's Hotel is a three-story, side-gable building with a symmetrical five-bay front facade with a center entrance, displaying both Greek Revival and Italianate architectural elements. It is constructed of solid, load-bearing red brick walls with yellow-brownish sandstone trim. A two-story ell projects from the rear. The eaves of the shallow roof are supported by regularly spaced brackets, and two brick chimneys are placed at either end of the roof.

The front facade contains a center entrance with two windows on either side; the entryway itself contains sidelights and a transom above. The stories above each contain six regularly spaced windows, unaligned with the first story openings. Each side elevations contain four windows in each story. Nearly all the windows are six-over-six double-hung units, many with original glazing. Sandstone lintels cap all the windows.

The building is set very close to the highway, and upon a slight rise, with a concrete retaining wall supporting the hillock. Opposite the highway, the hill falls away, exposing the basement story of the hotel. Across the highway is the wooden Walker Tavern, now part of the Cambridge Junction Historic State Park. Three historically contributing outbuildings are also located on the property, two board and batten barns dating from c. 1870, and one board-sided barn constructed in the 1920s.
