= Saint Elizabeth's Church (Tecumseh, Michigan) =

Historic church in Michigan, United States

- U.S. National Register of Historic Places
- Michigan State Historic Site
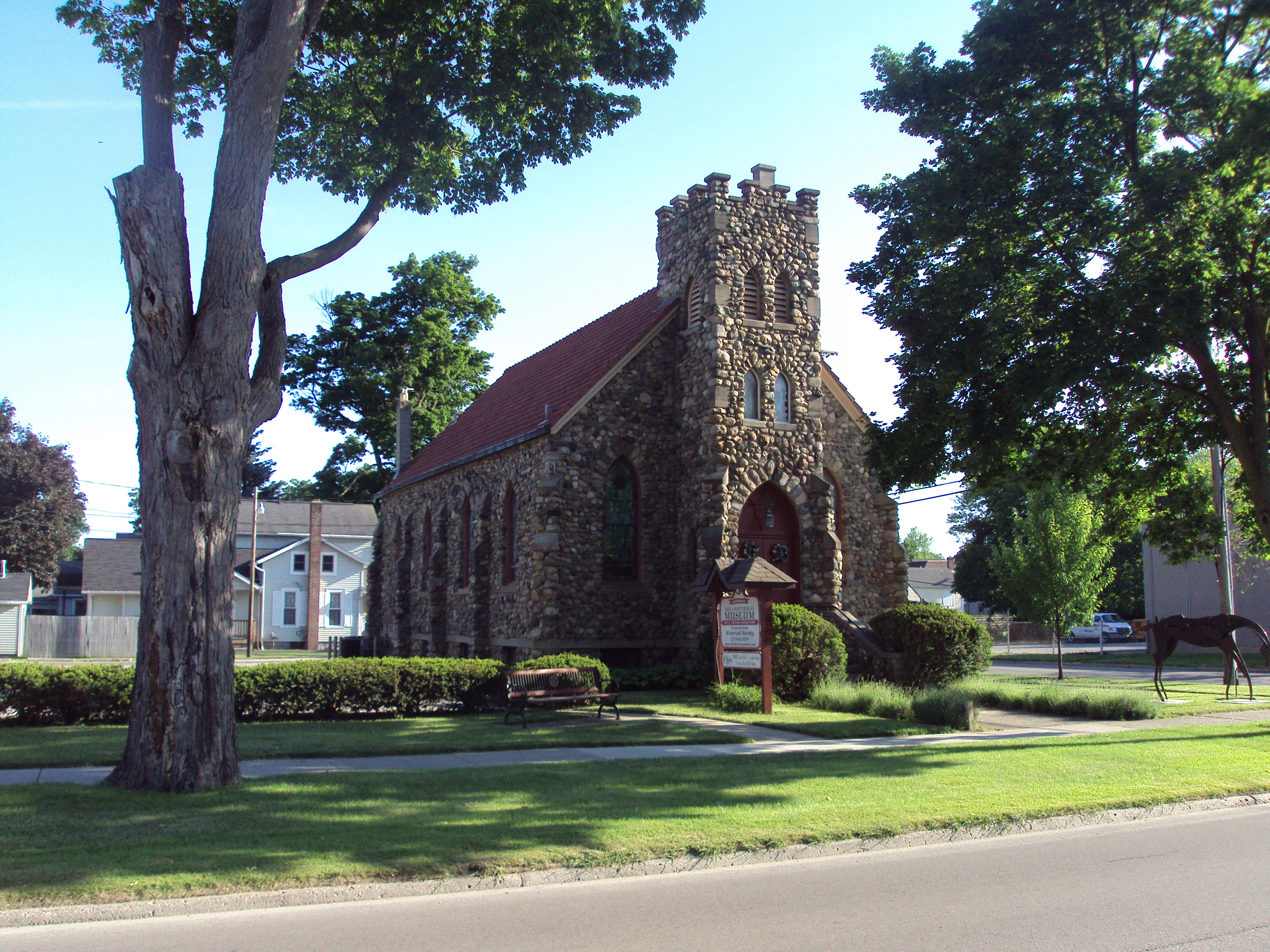

- Location within Michigan Location within the United States
- Interactive map
- Location: 302 E. Chicago Boulevard; Tecumseh, Michigan
- Coordinates: 42°00′14″N 83°56′30″W
- Built: 1913
- Architect: Father Edwin Fisher
- Architectural style: Gothic Revival
- MPS: Tecumseh MRA
- NRHP reference No.: 86001572

Significant dates
- Added to NRHP: August 13, 1986
- Designated MSHS: May 8, 1986

Saint Elizabeth's Church, also known as the Old Stone Church, is a historic church located at 302 East Chicago Boulevard (M-50) in downtown Tecumseh in Lenawee County, Michigan, USA. It was designated as a Michigan Historic Site on May 8, 1986, and later added to the National Register of Historic Places on August 13, 1986.

The building was purchased by the City of Tecumseh in 1982 and formally dedicated as the Tecumseh Area Historical Museum in 1986. It continues to serve that purpose.

== History ==
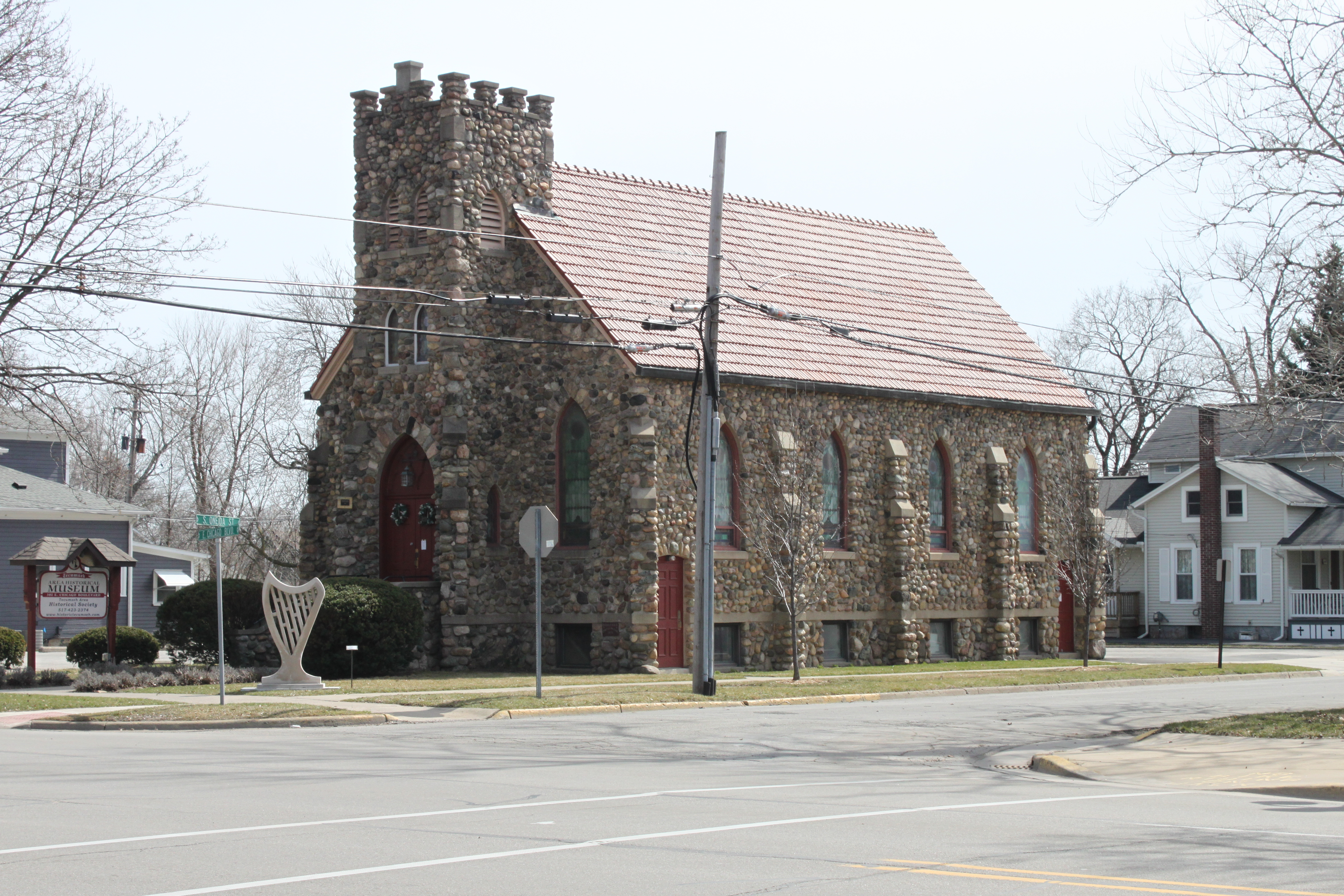
The church in early springtime

Saint Elizabeth's Church housed the first Catholic church built in the Protestant-dominated Tecumseh. Amid controversy, the Catholic church was built in 1913 with stone hauled from nearby fields by parishioners. When church membership outgrew the original structure, the congregation moved to a new facility in 1952. The Church of Christ purchased the building in 1954 but itself vacated by 1972 to a larger facility. From 1976 to 1982, the building had a commercial function as a stained glass studio. In 1982, the city of Tecumseh purchased and restored it for the Historical Society of Tecumseh.

== Description ==
Saint Elizabeth's Church is a small Gothic Revival church located one block east of the Tecumseh Downtown Historic District and across East Chicago Boulevard from the Dr. Samuel Catlin House. It is constructed with a wood frame, over which is a veneer of locally gathered fieldstone. The church has a symmetrical facade with a gable roof and a partly projecting central square tower with crenellated parapet. Two large stained glass windows flank the tower. Five more stained glass windows line each side, separated by simple buttresses. The roof is covered with red clay tile. The interior still contains much of its original craftsman, oak detailing.
