= House temple (disambiguation) =

House temple is a private Jain shrine that is placed within a personal residence.

House temple may also refer to:

- House church (Russia), sometimes literally translated as "house temple"
- House of the Temple, a Masonic Temple in Washington D.C.

== See also ==
- House church (disambiguation)
- Temple House (disambiguation)
