= Heman R. Goodrich House =

Historic house in Michigan, United States

- U.S. National Register of Historic Places
- Michigan State Historic Site
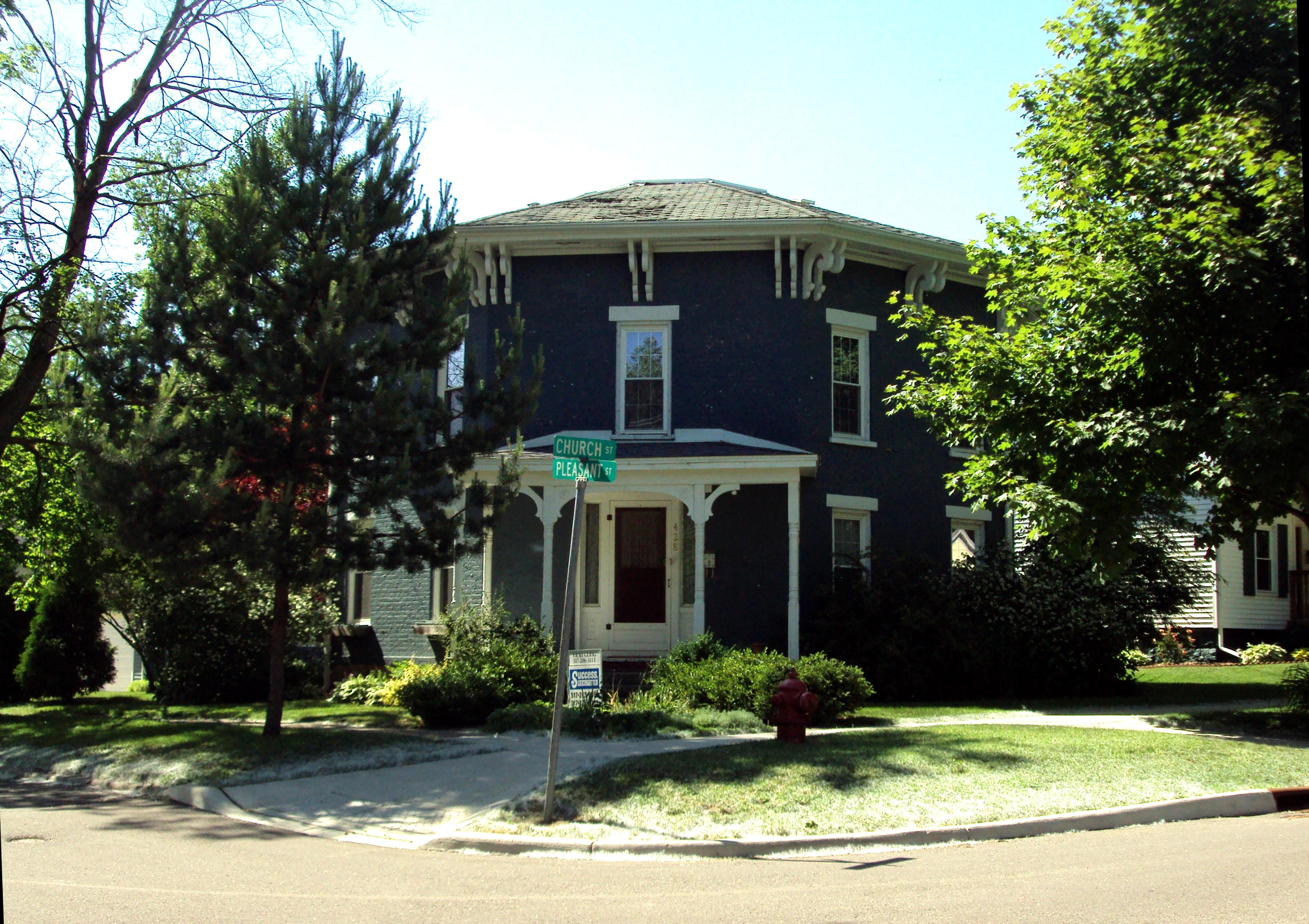

- Location within Michigan Location within the United States
- Interactive map
- Location: 428 S. Church Street; Hudson, Michigan
- Coordinates: 41°51′01″N 84°21′19″W
- Built: 1861
- Architect: Heman Goodrich
- Architectural style: Octagon house
- NRHP reference No.: 91001996
- Added to NRHP: January 22, 1992

The Heman R. Goodrich House is a private residence located 428 South Church Street in Hudson in west Lenawee County, Michigan. It was designated as a Michigan Historic Site and added to the National Register of Historic Places on January 22, 1992.

Built between 1861 and 1862, this house was built by Heman Goodrich, who was one of Hudson's first settlers in 1836. In 1854, he married Almira Carleton, sister of famed poet Will Carleton, who also lived in Hudson. The house is one of only a few remaining octagon houses in Michigan, which was a popular fad during the time the house was constructed. It is only one of two such structures in Lenawee County, the other being the J. H. Champion House, in Adrian. The house is a brick, two-story building, and each side of the house is 15 feet (4.6 m) in length.

The house stands at the corner of South Church Street and Pleasant Street, which is three blocks south of the Hudson Downtown Historic District and two blocks from the Gamaliel Thompson House.
