= G. P. Sparks House =

Historic house in Michigan, United States

- U.S. National Register of Historic Places
- Michigan State Historic Site
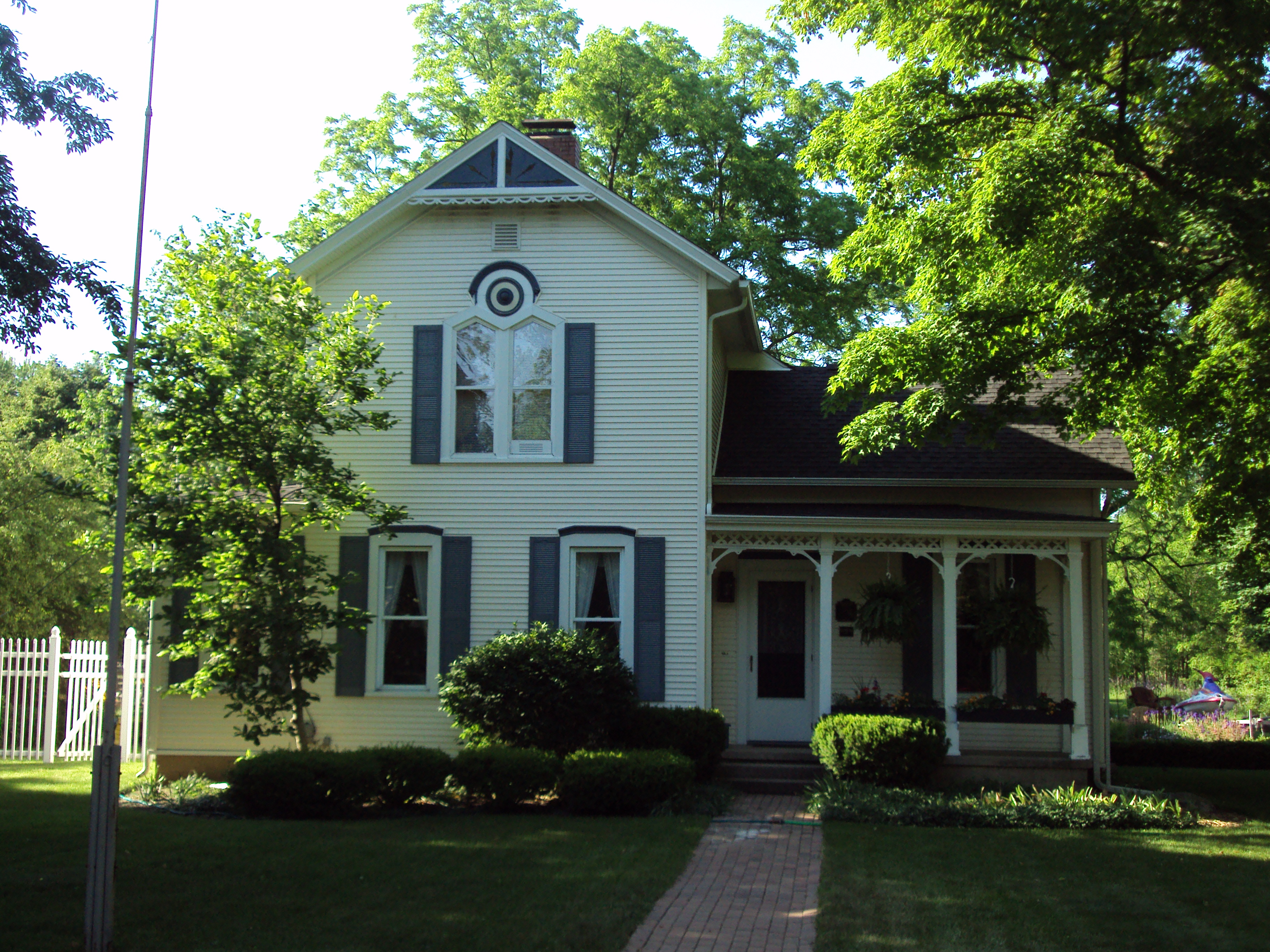

- Location within Michigan Location within the United States
- Interactive map
- Location: 509 East Logan St., Tecumseh, Michigan
- Coordinates: 42°00′21″N 83°56′16″W
- Built: 1883
- Architectural style: Late Victorian
- MPS: Tecumseh MRA
- NRHP reference No.: 86001571
- Added to NRHP: August 13, 1986

The G. P. Sparks House is a historic private residence located at 509 East Logan Street in the city of Tecumseh in northeast Lenawee County, Michigan.

== Description ==
The G. P. Sparks House is a two-story upright and wing house constructed in the Late Victorian style of architecture. The end-gable roof has a pierced-work gable ornament. The first floor of the two story upright section contains a pair of windows with small hoods and shutters; the second floor contains paired, triangle-head, windows, above which is a bullseye topped by a drip molding. The single story wing is slightly set back, and is fronted by a porch with narrow, squared posts and frieze panels, sheltering the entrance. The porch contains delicate latticework brackets.

The privately owned G. P. Sparks house is located one block away from M-50 near the River Raisin and just down East Logan Street from the Musgrove Evans House.

== History ==
The Sparks house was built in 1883 for local musical instrument and sewing merchant G. P. Sparks and his wife Mary. They apparently lived in the house for only five years before moving to the store building where Sparks's business was located.

Because of its pristine detailing and well-preserved appearance, it is regarded as one of the most significant pieces of architecture in Tecumseh.

It was designated as a Michigan Historic Site and added to the National Register of Historic Places on August 13, 1986.
