= Lorenzo and Ruth Wells Palmer House =

Historic house in Michigan, United States

- Lorenzo Palmer and Ruth Wells House
- U.S. National Register of Historic Places
- Michigan State Historic Site
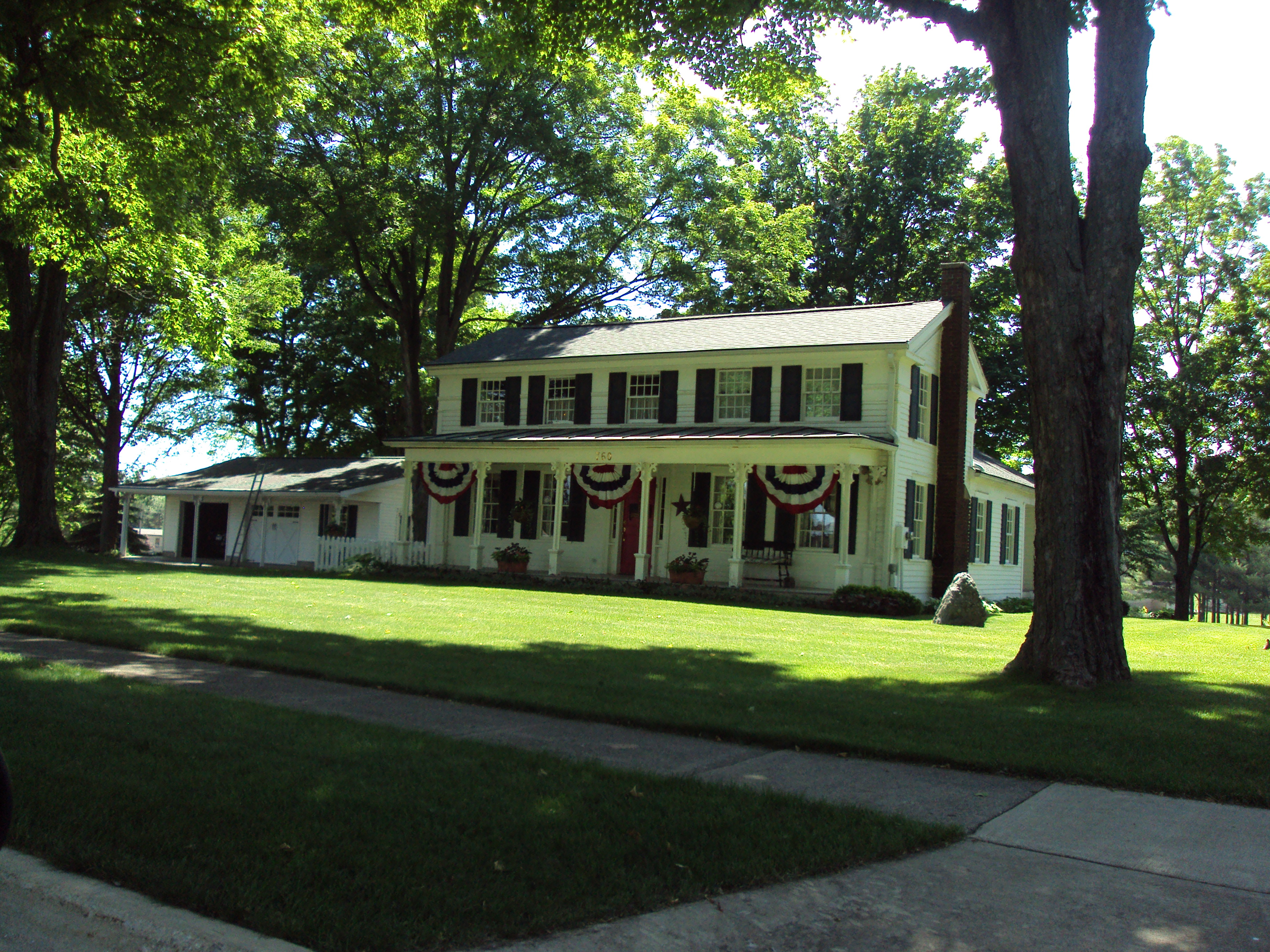

- Location within Michigan Location within the United States
- Interactive map showing building location
- Location: 760 Maple Grove Avenue; Hudson, Michigan
- Coordinates: 41°51′52″N 84°20′58″W
- Built: 1845
- Architect: Lorenzo Palmer
- Architectural style: Greek Revival
- NRHP reference No.: 01001070
- Added to NRHP: October 8, 2001

The Lorenzo Palmer and Ruth Wells House is a privately owned house located at 760 Maple Grove Avenue in the city of Hudson in westernmost Lenawee County, Michigan, United States. It was designated as a Michigan State Historic State and listed on the National Register of Historic Places on October 8, 2001.

== History ==
Lorenzo Palmer was born in Litchfield, Connecticut in 1803. His parents moved Delaware County, New York, and Palmer later moved to Chautauqua County, New York and taught school. In 1824 he married Ruth Wells, and the couple had eight children. In 1843, they moved to Hudson, and the next year bought the lot on which this house stands. In 1845, they built this house, likely doing the work himself. Ruth Wells Palmer died in 1853, and Palmer married Nancy Gamble. Lorenzo Palmer died in 1874.

== Description ==
The 1845 Palmer house was built in the style of Greek Revival. It is one of the oldest houses in Hudson and shares a similar design to other houses built in Connecticut and New York at the time. While Palmer was one of many New York natives who moved to Michigan in the 1830s and 1840s, his house is unique among Lenawee County's early houses and retains most of its original characteristics.

The house is a two-story central hall plan I-house with a front porch extending the entire length of the front. It sits on a stone foundation and is shingled. The entry door is flanked by beveled glass, and two windows flank the door. The second floor contains five windows. All windows are wood sash, double-hung windows, and either six-over-six, or eight-over-eight. The gable ends of the house display the frieze and cornice returns typical of Greek Revival style.

On the interior, a hallway runs through the length of the house, and a closed staircase leads up to two upper bedrooms. On the main floor are a parlor and formal dining room. Two modern additions contain a kitchen, family room, and master bedroom.
