= Dr. Leonard Hall House =

Historic house in Michigan, United States

- U.S. National Register of Historic Places
- U.S. Historic district – Contributing property
- Michigan State Historic Site
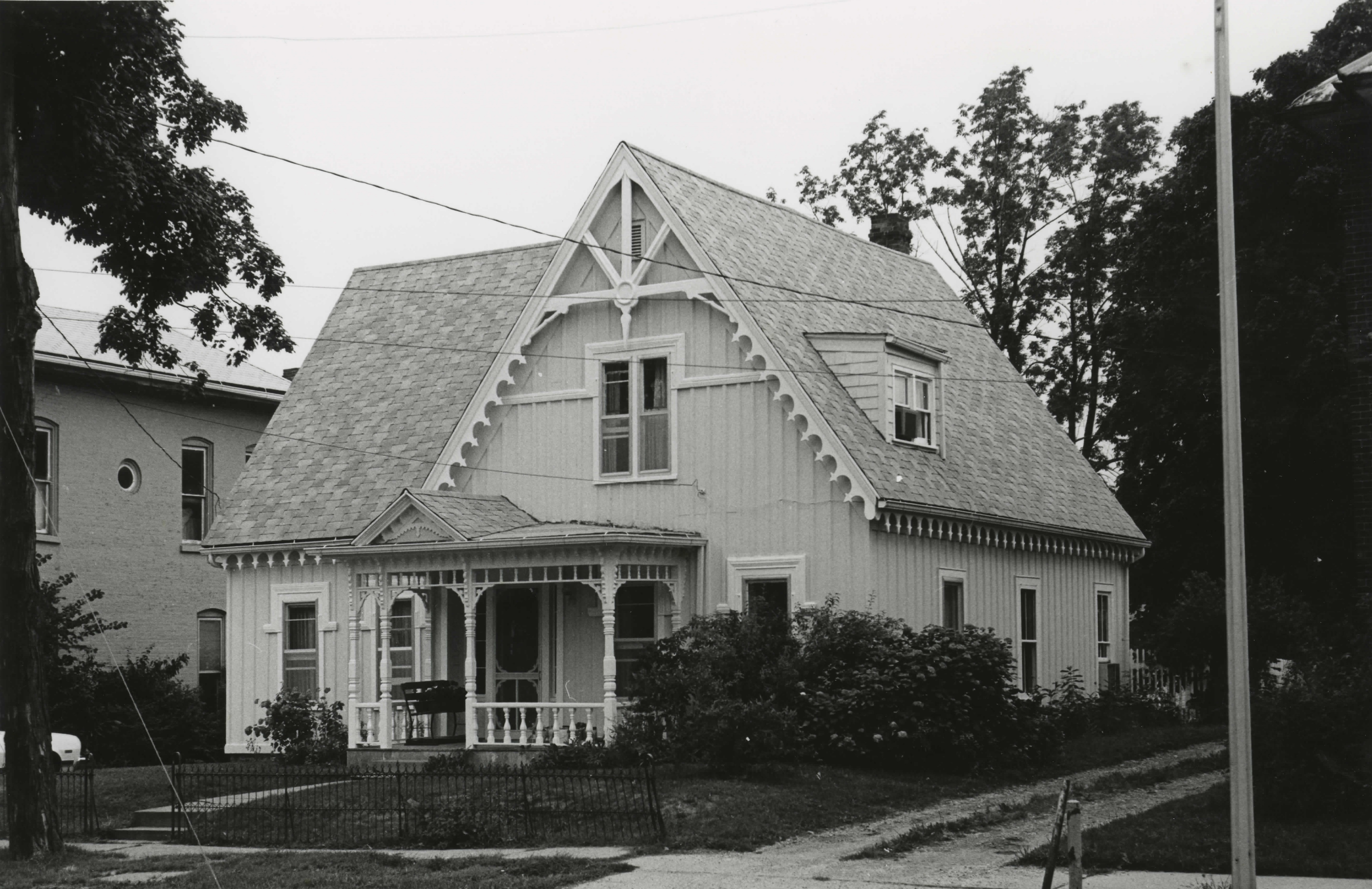
- Dr. Leonard Hall House in 1976

- Location within Michigan Location within the United States
- Interactive map
- Location: 334 West Main Street; Hudson, Michigan
- Coordinates: 41°51′17″N 84°21′25″W
- Built: 1847
- Architectural style: Gothic Revival
- Part of: Hudson Downtown Historic District
- NRHP reference No.: 78001503

Significant dates
- Added to NRHP: October 2, 1978
- Designated MSHS: April 4, 1978

The Dr. Leonard Hall House was a private resident located at 334 West Main Street (M-34) in Hudson in westernmost Lenawee County, Michigan. It was designated as a Michigan Historic Site on April 4, 1978, and later added to the National Register of Historic Places on October 2, 1978.

== History ==
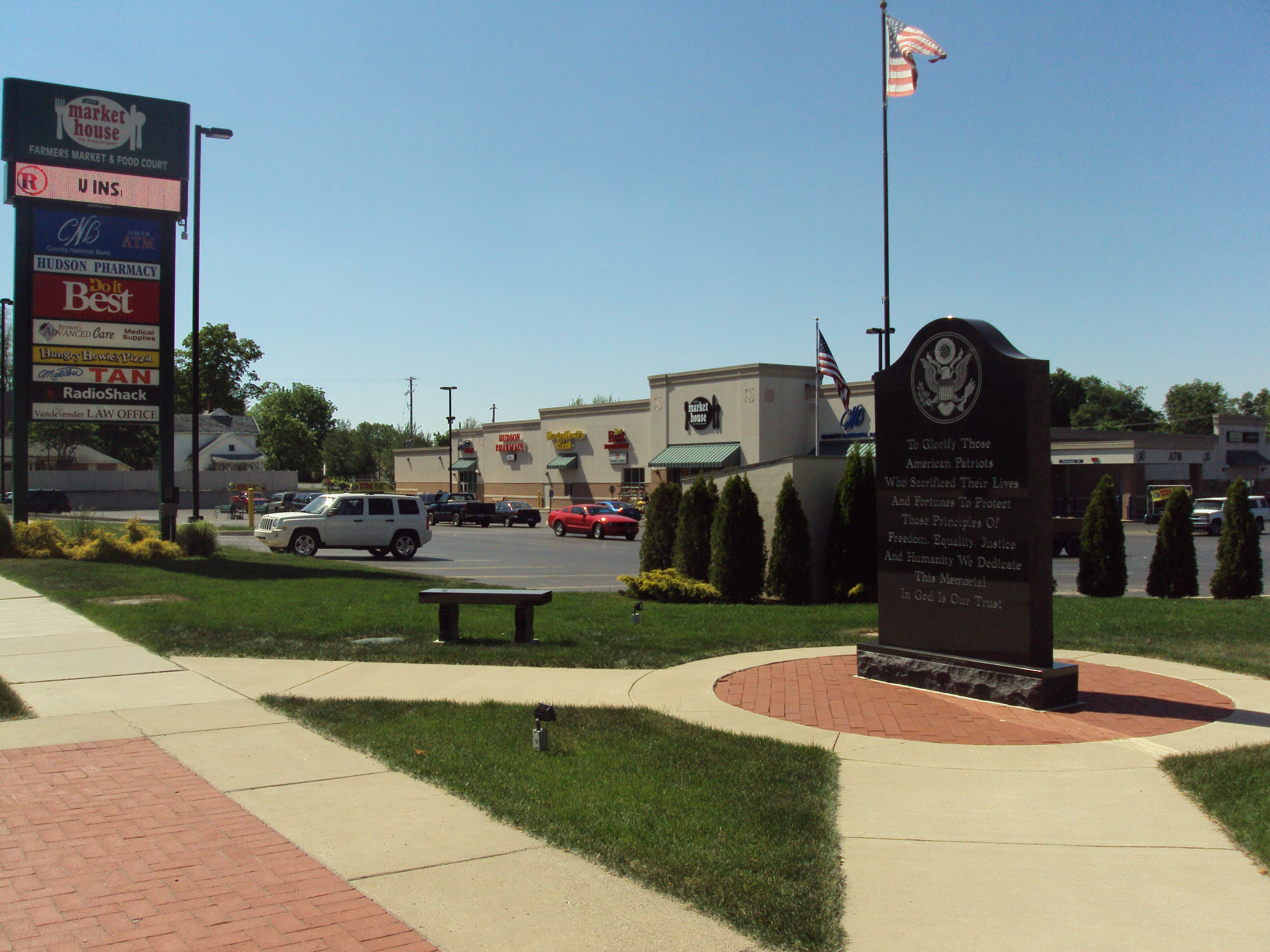
The present day location of the Hall House, which has since been demolished.

The house was constructed in 1847 by wealthy physician Dr. Leonard Hall, who was one of the earliest pioneers in Hudson. Hall was born in 1806 in upstate New York, and completed his medical training 1834. The following year, he established a practice in rural Lenawee County. In 1840, he married Nancy Wells and relocated to Hudson. This 1847 house was one of the city's first residences. In 1877, Hall died and passed the house on to his son, Henry Hall, who served as Hudson's mayor. The Hall family maintained ownership for quite some time until the house was sold to the city, where it was torn down in recent years to make room for commercial development.

A strip mall now occupies the vicinity, and an unrelated war memorial rests on the property of the former Dr. Leonard Hall House. The house was located on the edge of the Hudson Downtown Historic District. Though demolished, it is still officially listed on the National Register of Historic Places and is the only historic listing in Lenawee County to have been demolished.

== Description ==
The house was a wooden 1½ story, front-gabled Gothic Revival structure with vertical siding and batten siding. The steeply pitched roof had prominent scalloped and gingerbreaded bargeboards under the eaves, with a kingpost and beams ornamenting the gable. The front facade had an asymmetrical front porch with turned wood columns and spindle railings. The small front doorway was flanked with four-pane sidelights. The remainder of the windows were double hung with hood molds.

On the interior, the first floor was symmetric about the central entrance hall, with a front parlor, dining room, and library on one side and a bedroom and adjoining bath on the other. The second floor was remodeled into a small apartment.

== See also ==
- History of the National Register of Historic Places
- United States National Register of Historic Places listings
