= Gamaliel Thompson House =

Historic house in Michigan, United States

- U.S. National Register of Historic Places
- Michigan State Historic Site
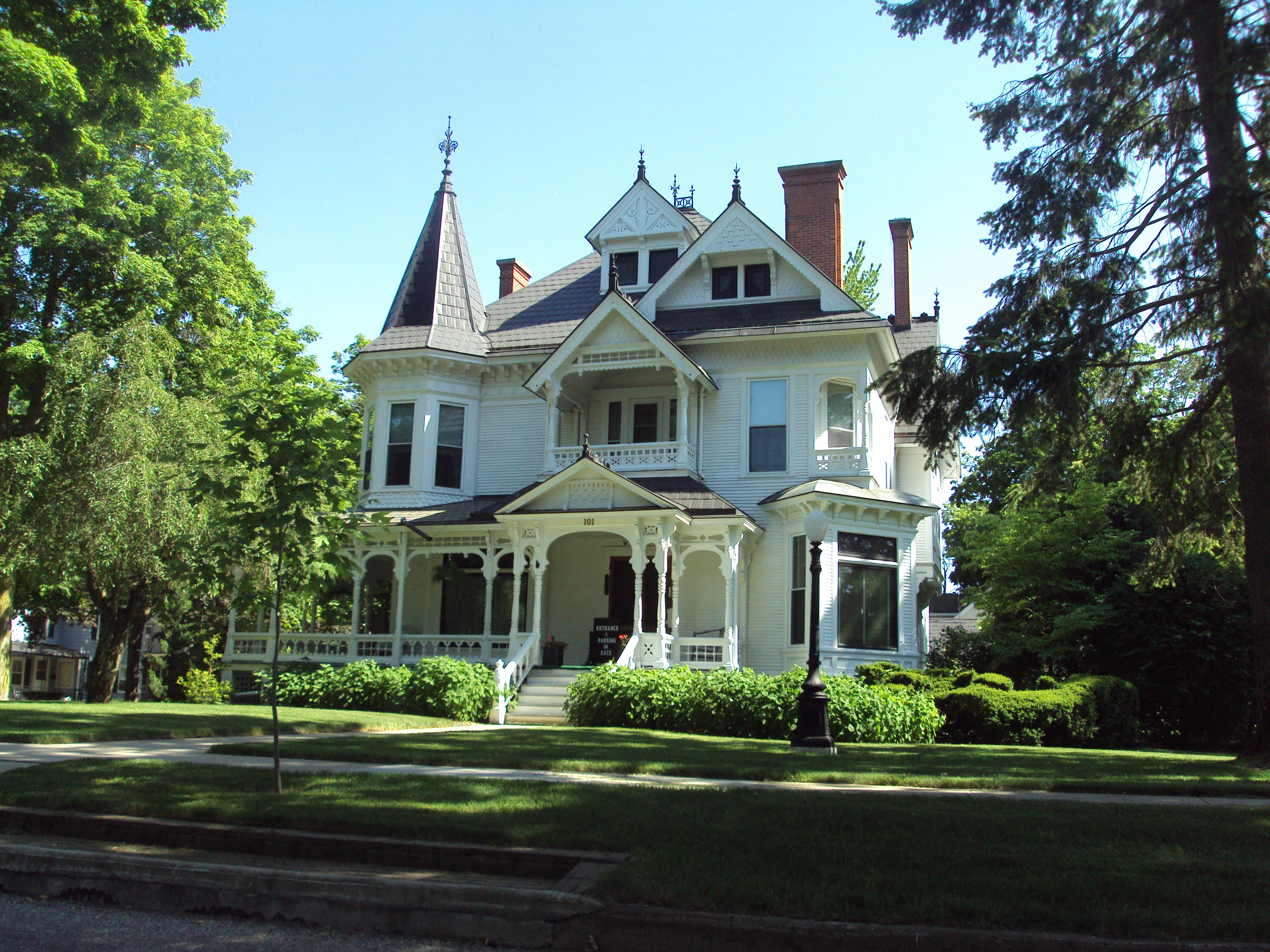

- Location within Michigan Location within the United States
- Interactive map
- Location: 101 Summit Street; Hudson, Michigan
- Coordinates: 41°51′06″N 84°21′14″W
- Built: 1890–1891
- Architect: John Matthes and Co.
- Architectural style: Queen Anne
- NRHP reference No.: 75000952

Significant dates
- Added to NRHP: April 3, 1975
- Designated MSHS: February 22, 1974

The Gamaliel Thompson House is a former residential structure located at 101 Summit Street in the city of Hudson in westernmost Lenawee County, Michigan. It was designated as a Michigan State Historic State on February 22, 1974, and soon after listed on the National Register of Historic Places on April 3, 1975. It is located two blocks south of the Heman R. Goodrich House. The Thompson House now serves as the William G. Thompson House Museum.

== History ==
Gamaliel Thompson was born near the village of Fort Ann, New York in 1843. In 1861 he moved from New York State to Hudson, obtaining work as a clerk and bookkeeper. He later became involved in general merchandising, and in 1867, with the founding of the banking firm of Perkins, Osborn, and Co., became associated with the banking business. He and his family eventually bought out the other owners of the bank, and by the 1890s the bank was known as Thompson's Savings Bank, with Gamaliel Thompson as vice-president.

In 1890, Thompson hired John L. Matthes and Company of Adrian to construct this house at a cost of $6,500. It was finished the following year. The house has been owned by the Thompson family since it was built. It no longer functions a home, but in 2004 was turned into the William G. Thompson House Museum housing the collections of the Thompson family.

== Description ==
The Gamaliel Thompson House is one of the finest surviving Queen Anne style houses in Michigan. The structure retains all of its original features.

The Gamaliel Thompson House is a two-and-one-half story wooden structure with a profusion of bays and porches. The house is clad with clapboard, save for the two gabled dormers. The irregularly shaped roof is covered with green painted tin and trimmed with corniced boxed brackets. There is a corner turret, two balconies, and a front porch with ornamental trim. The exterior has a number of other decorative elements.

The interior of the house is remained basically unchanged from the original layout., save a modernized kitchen. A notable feature of the interior is the cherry paneling which lines the library walls, and the elliptical stained glass window in the same room. The furniture within the house also dates from the era of the house's construction.
