= George B. and Amanda Bradish Horton Farmstead =

Historic house in Michigan, United States

- George B. Horton and Amanda Bradish Farmstead
- U.S. National Register of Historic Places
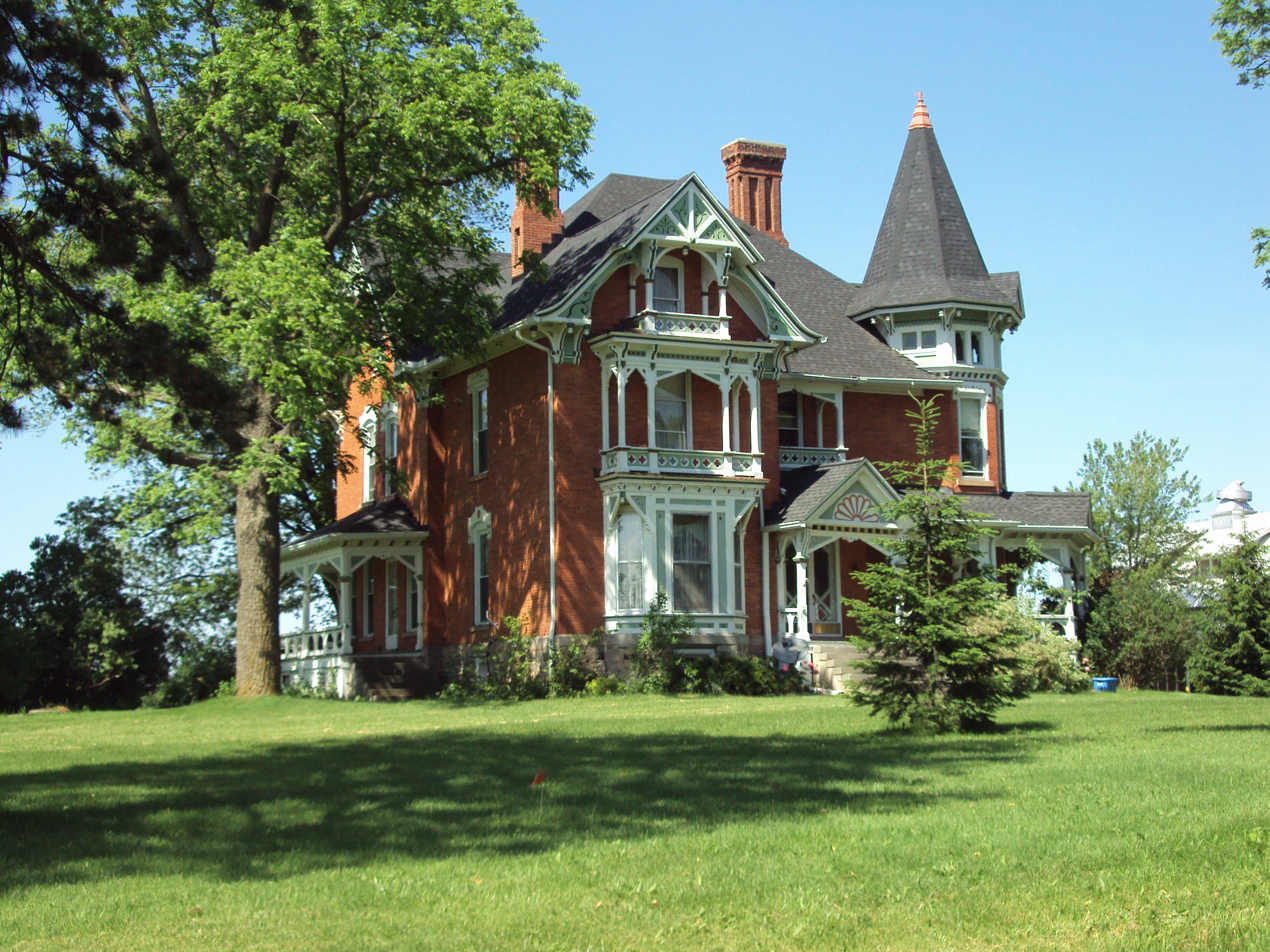

- Location within Michigan Location within the United States
- Interactive map
- Location: 4650 West Horton Road; Fairfield Township, Michigan
- Coordinates: 41°47′58″N 84°06′42″W
- Area: 40 acres (16 ha)
- Built: 1888
- Architectural style: Queen Anne
- NRHP reference No.: 06001333
- Added to NRHP: February 1, 2007

The George B. Horton and Amanda Bradish Farmstead is a privately owned farmhouse that sits on 40 acres (16 ha) of land at 4650 West Horton Road in rural Fairfield Township in Lenawee County, Michigan. It was added to the National Register of Historic Places on February 1, 2007. There are several other buildings on the property, but the main farmhouse was built in 1888 in Queen Anne Style.

== History ==
George B. Horton was born on April 17, 1845, in Lafayette, Ohio, the son of Samuel and Lucina Horton. The Horton family moved to Michigan in 1851, and established a farm located across the road from this present farmstead. Lucina Horton had knowledge of cheese-making, and the family began processing cheese in 1853, and by 1866 founded a cheese factory. George Horton worked on the farm, and when his father died in 1872, bought out his sisters and began farming the then 350-acre tract, which includes some of the acreage associated with the present homestead. Horton married Amanda Bradish in 1878, and continued to expand his holdings, acquiring 710 acres by the early 1890s.

In about 1888, the couple constructed the large brick home on this farmstead, located across the road from his parents’ home. By the early 1900s, Horton owned over 1,400 acres of farmland and forest, spread over four farmsteads in the county, and in 1914 he owned seven cheese factories capable of producing 1.5 million pounds of cheese per year. George Horton died in 1922, and his children carried on his estate. His son Norman B. Horton moved into the house along with his mother Amanda. However, the holdings declined to only 80 acres in 1933, and Norman Horton committed suicide. The farm was sold multiple times afterward. Fred and Carolyn Holden purchased it in 1982, and sold it to Ed and Joann Allen in 2004.

== Description ==
The George B. and Amanda Bradish Horton Farmstead consists of a c. 1888 Queen Anne residence along with a barn and shed, both constructed around 1900. The farmstead is set back from the road, and the immediate area of the farmstead encompassed about four acres.

The house is a large 2 1/2-story brick structure with a central hipped roof and four cross gables. A turret is located at one corner of the house. Most of windows are one-over-one double-hung sash with concrete sills and brick hoods. The front contains a single-story hip-roof porch, wrapping around to one side. The porch is supported with square columns A second porch is located on the other side of the house. The front also has a gable with bay window and upper balconies.

On the interior, the house has a central entry hall, with two parlors at the front and a stair leading upward. In the rear are a library and bath on one side, and a dining room and kitchen on the other. A casual sitting room completes the layout. On the second floor, there are four large bedrooms and two smaller bedrooms, originally designed for servants, as well as a bathroom and laundry room.
