= Joseph Temple House =

Historic house in Massachusetts, United States

- U.S. National Register of Historic Places
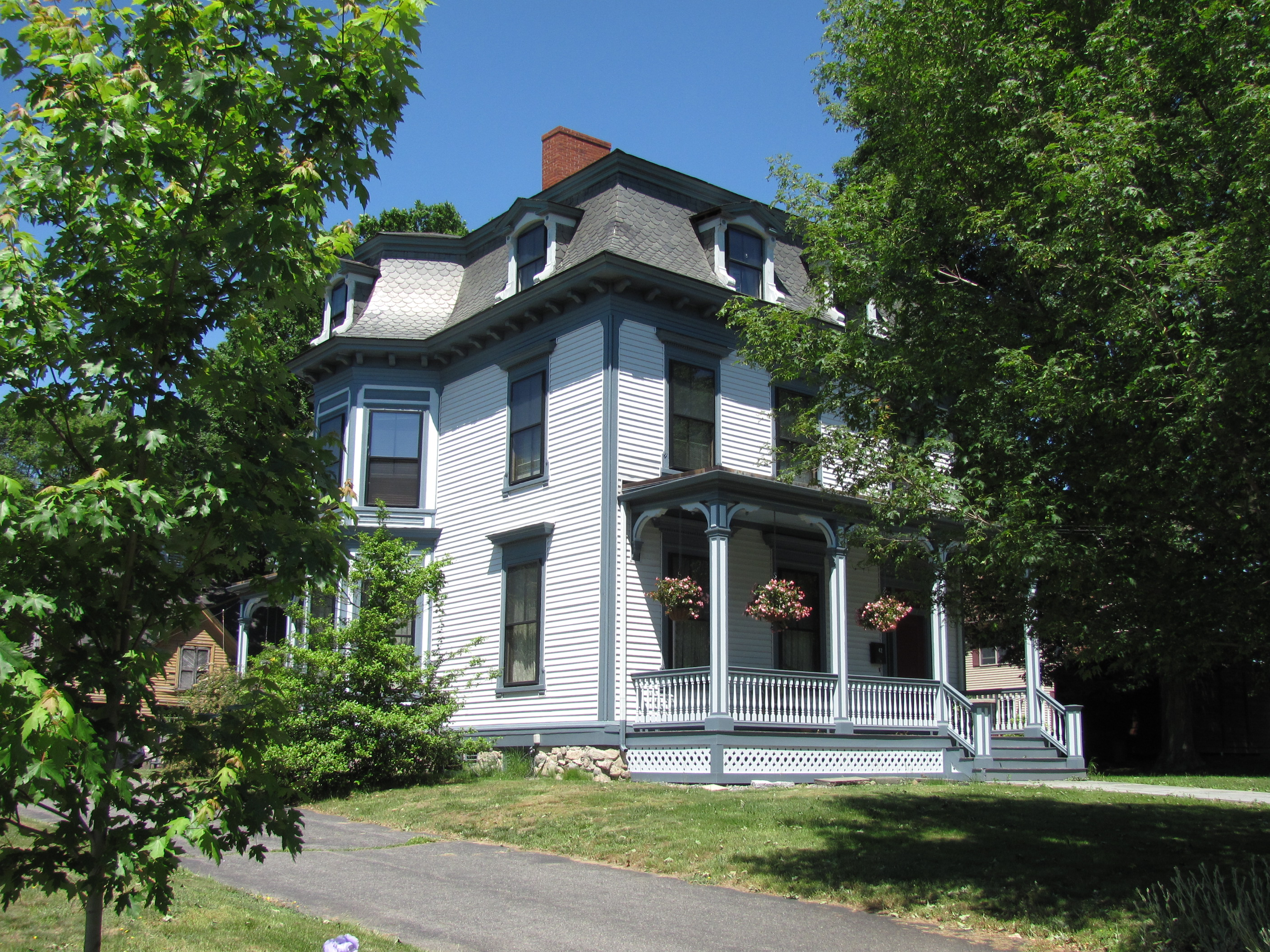
- Joseph Temple House

- Location within Massachusetts Location within the United States
- Location: 42 Chute Street, Reading, Massachusetts
- Coordinates: 42°31′25″N 71°6′33″W
- Built: 1872
- Architectural style: Second Empire
- MPS: Reading MRA
- NRHP reference No.: 84002835
- Added to NRHP: July 19, 1984

The Joseph Temple House is a historic house in Reading, Massachusetts. The Second Empire wood-frame house was built in 1872 by Joseph Temple, owner of locally prominent necktie manufacturer. The house was listed on the National Register of Historic Places in 1984.

== Description and history ==
The Temple House is set on the west side of Chute Street, a side street in a residential area west of Reading's central business district. The house is a two-story wood-frame structure, with a mansard roof providing a full third story. The mansard roof features deep flared eaves with decorative brackets, and the windows in its gabled dormers are topped by dentillated cornices. The main facade, facing east, is three bays wide, with a single-story porch extending across its width. The porch has a flat roof, and is supported by turned posts with decorative brackets, and has turned balusters. The main entrance is in the rightmost bay, and is framed by sidelight and transom windows. The other bays have simple sash windows, and are topped by relatively plain projecting cornices. The side elevation has a projecting polygonal bay, with small recessed panels above and below its windows.

The house was built in 1872, in a neighborhood laid out after the railroad arrived in 1848. Joseph Temple was a Reading native who entered the business of the locally prominent Damon family, whose firm manufactured neckties on premises in Reading center. In 1910 the division that Temple ran was producing 250,000 neckties per year.

== See also ==
- National Register of Historic Places listings in Reading, Massachusetts
- National Register of Historic Places listings in Middlesex County, Massachusetts
