= Walker Tavern =

Historic tavern in Michigan, United States

- U.S. National Register of Historic Places
- Michigan State Historic Site
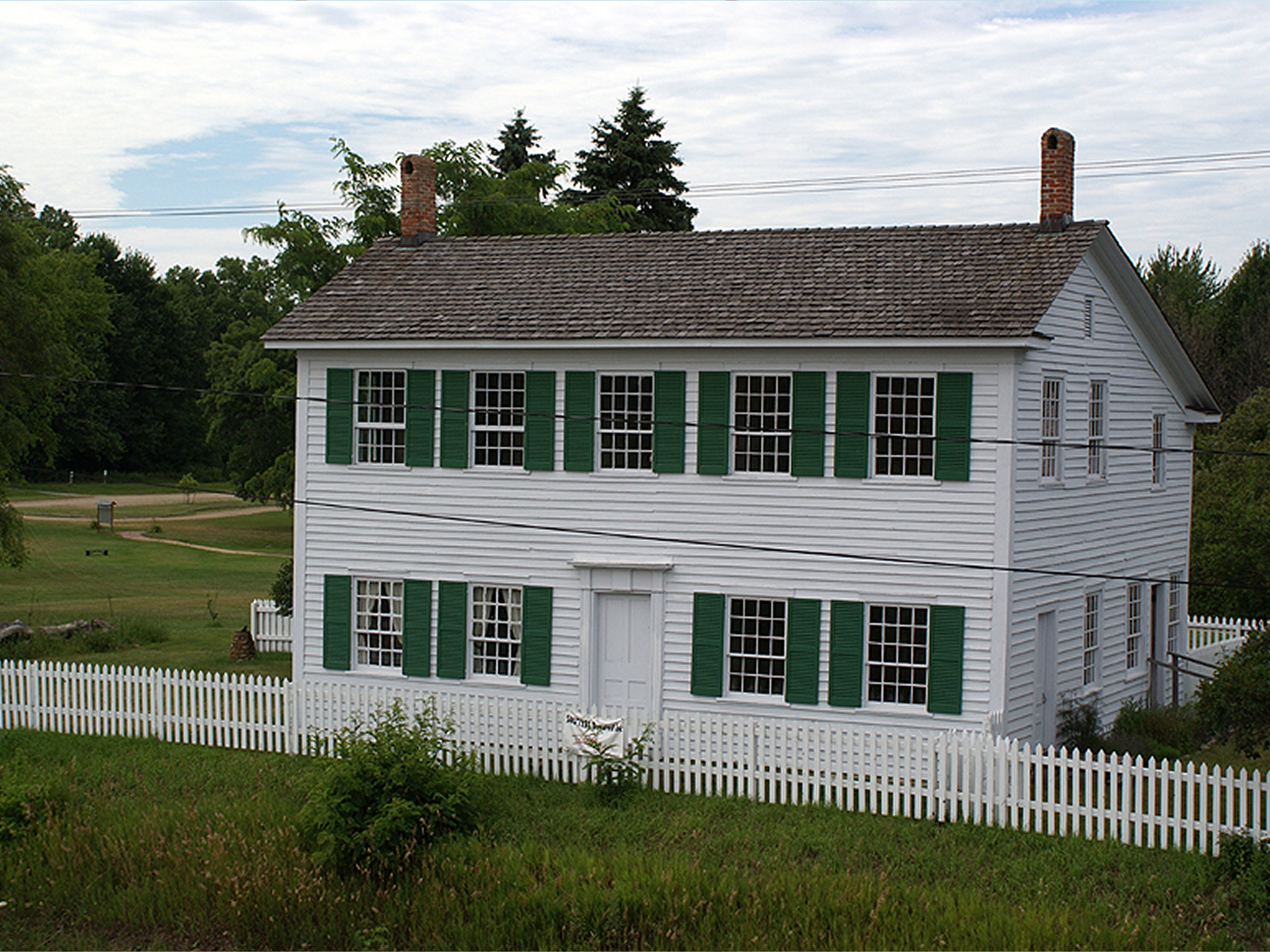

- Location within Michigan Location within the United States
- Interactive map
- Location: 11710 U.S. Route 12; Cambridge Township, Michigan
- Coordinates: 42°03′36″N 84°13′30″W
- Built: c. 1832
- Architectural style: Federal
- Part of: Cambridge Junction Historic State Park
- NRHP reference No.: 71000404

Significant dates
- Added to NRHP: January 25, 1971
- Designated MSHS: February 19, 1958

The Walker Tavern is a historic structure located at 11710 U.S. Route 12 in Cambridge Township in northwesternmost Lenawee County, Michigan. It was designated as a Michigan Historic Site on February 19, 1958, and was later the county's first property added to the National Register of Historic Places on January 25, 1971. The structure was incorporated into the Cambridge Junction Historic State Park and continues to serve as a museum and venue for various events.

== History ==
This structure was built as a modest farmhouse around 1832 by an unknown architect in the Federal architecture style. It stood at the important intersection of the former Chicago Road (U.S Route 12) and the Monroe Pike (M-50). At some point, Calvin Snell began operating the building as a tavern for travelers along the road. Around 1838, Sylvester and Lucy Walker moved from New York State and began leasing the inn and tavern from Snell. In 1842, the Walkers purchased the tavern and renamed it the Walker Tavern. In addition to a tavern, it also served as an inn for travelers from Monroe en route from Detroit to Chicago — a stagecoach trip that once took five days. Famous guests included Daniel Webster and James Fenimore Cooper. The structure served a variety of purposes, including a meeting place for religious and political gatherings.

Walker operated the tavern until about 1853, when he constructed a similar establishment, S. Walker's Hotel, across the street. In 1865, the older Walker Tavern was purchased by Francis A. Dewey. In 1921, Frederic Hewitt purchased the tavern and converted it into a museum. In 1965, the Walker Tavern was sold to the Michigan DNR, and it underwent several alterations during a restoration process.

== Description ==
The Walker Tavern is a two-story frame structure, sided with whitewood clapboard, and situated on a low rise of ground. It is framed with hand-hewn white oak timbers approximately eight inches square. A fieldstone basement extends under about half of the building. The original portion of the tavern measures roughly 36 feet by 18 feet, and three major additions were later made to the rear, extending its depth.
