= Tecumseh Historic District (Tecumseh, Michigan) =

Historic district in Michigan, United States

- U.S. National Register of Historic Places
- U.S. Historic district
- Michigan State Historic Site
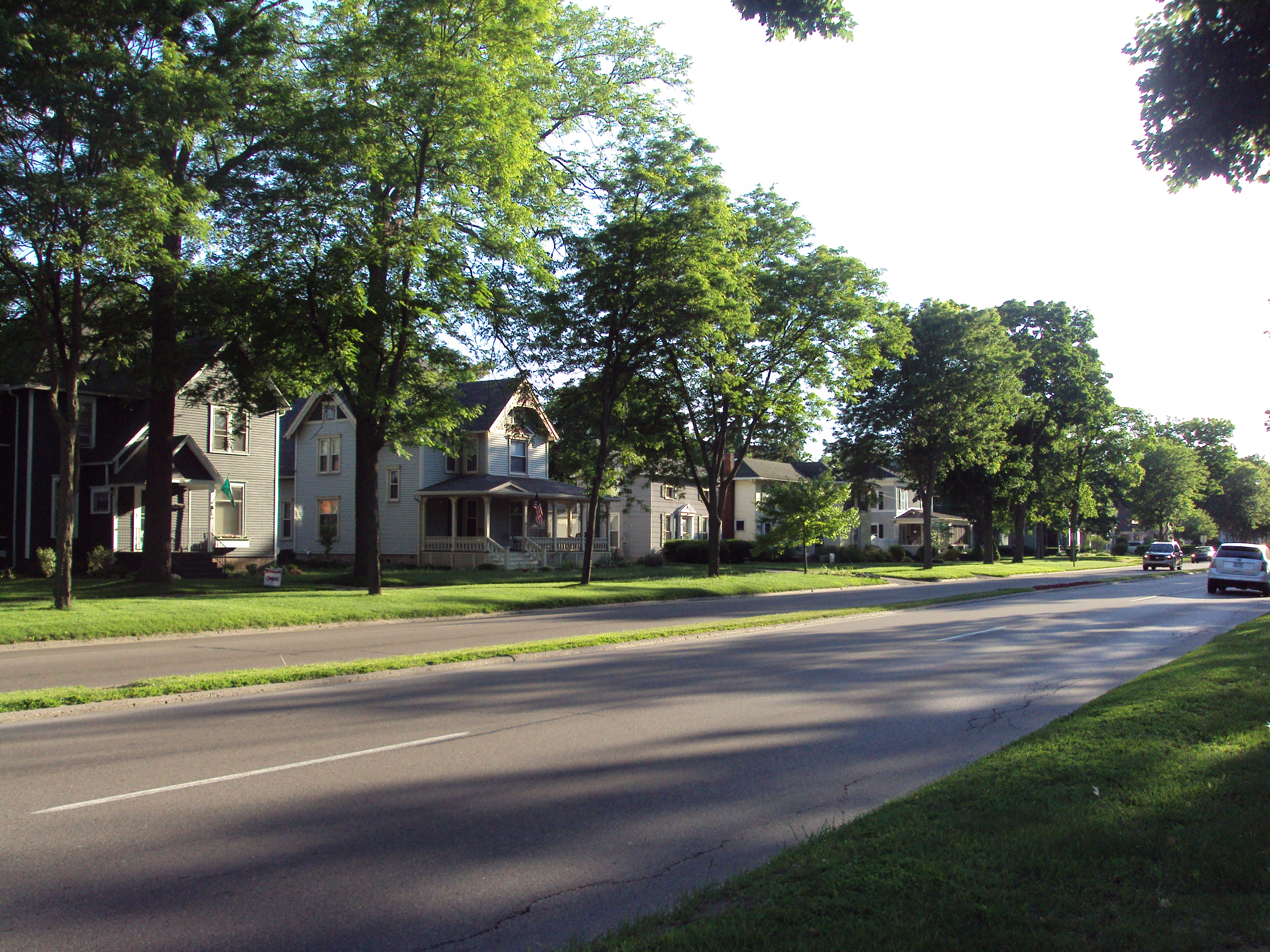
- Looking west along Chicago Boulevard

- Location within Michigan Location within the United States
- Location: Tecumseh, Michigan
- Coordinates: 42°00′15″N 83°57′04″W
- Architectural style: Greek Revival and Italianate
- NRHP reference No.: 84001796 (original); 86001560 (increase)

Significant dates
- Added to NRHP: September 13, 1984
- Boundary increase: May 18, 1990

The Tecumseh Historic District is a residential historic district located in the city of Tecumseh in Lenawee County, Michigan, United States. It was designated as a Michigan Historic Site and added to the National Register of Historic Places on September 13, 1984. On May 18, 1990, the district received a boundary expansion, which required an additional listing on the National Register of Historic Places.

The district, which contains houses dating back to the 1830s, centers on the intersection of West Chicago Boulevard (M-50) and Union Street. The district contains 82 houses, three churches, a former school, and a library as contributing properties. The structures primarily date from the late-nineteenth to the early-twentieth century and consist mostly of Greek Revival and Italianate architecture. On May 18, 1990, the district received an expansion of two houses located on 704–710 West Chicago Boulevard, bringing the total number of houses in the district up to 84.

The Tecumseh Historic District is sometimes referred to as the “West Chicago Boulevard-Union Street Historic District” to distinguish it from the Tecumseh Downtown Historic District, which is located just east on West Chicago Boulevard.
