= Musgrove Evans House =

Historic house in Michigan, United States

- U.S. National Register of Historic Places
- Michigan State Historic Site
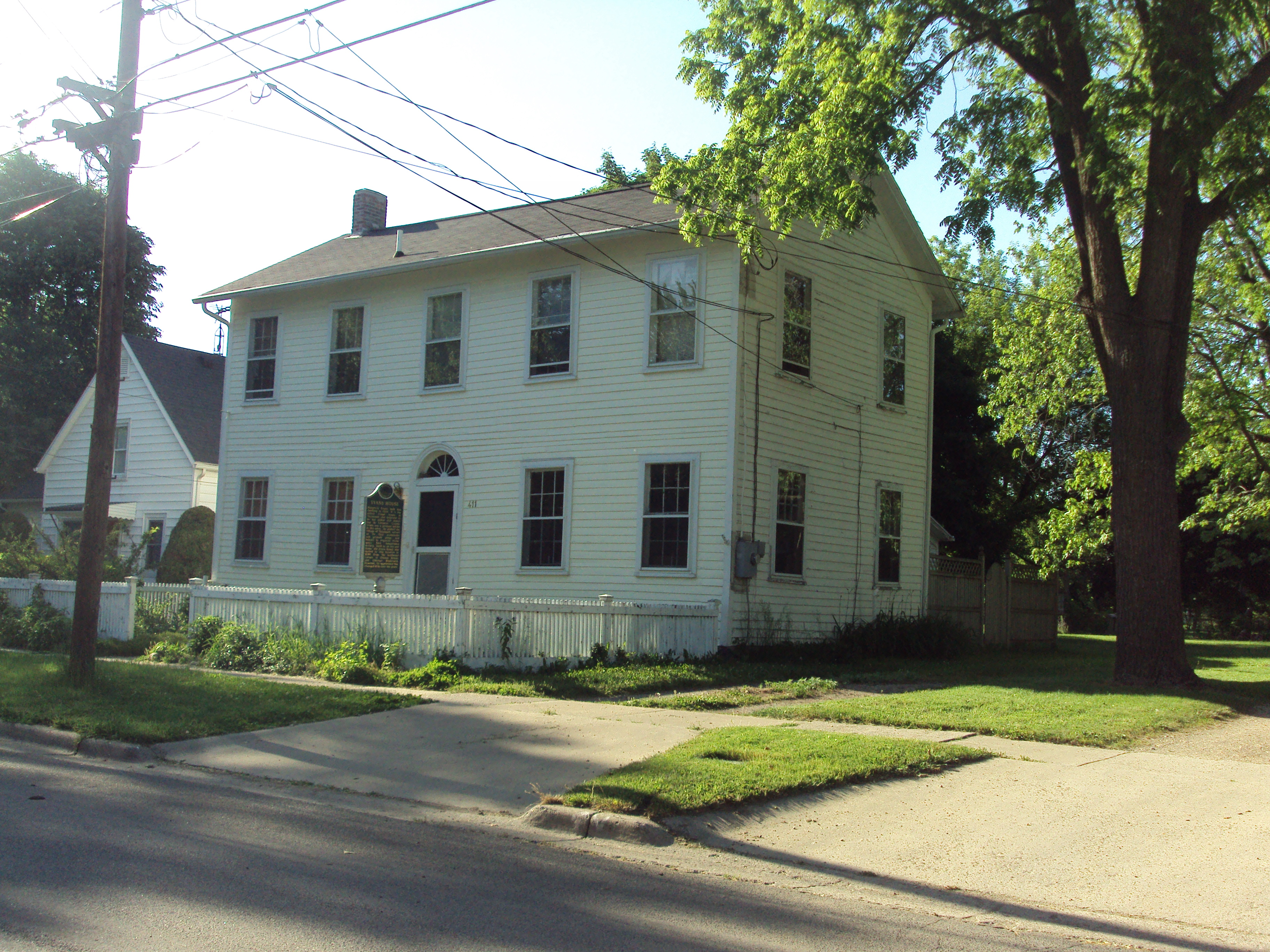

- Location within Michigan Location within the United States
- Interactive map
- Location: 409–411 E. Logan Street; Tecumseh, Lenawee County, Michigan
- Coordinates: 42°00′20″N 83°56′23″W
- Built: 1826
- Architectural style: Federal
- NRHP reference No.: 72000634

Significant dates
- Added to NRHP: March 16, 1972
- Designated MSHS: October 29, 1971

The Musgrove Evans House is a private residence in Tecumseh, Michigan, USA. It was designated as a Michigan Historic Site on October 29, 1971, and was listed on the National Register of Historic Places on March 16, 1972. It is recognized as the oldest residential structure in Lenawee County and one of the oldest in the state of Michigan.

== History ==
Surveyor Musgrove Evans (1785-1855) originally platted Tecumseh in 1824 and built a crude log cabin. In 1826, Evans built this modest house at what is now the corner of Ottawa Street and Chicago Boulevard for his personal dwelling and for use as an inn for travelers. Musgrove's wife Abigail "Abi" Brown Evans, for whom a local chapter of the Daughters of the American Revolution was later named, died in the early 1830s. In 1834, Evans moved with his children to colonial Texas, where his eldest son, Samuel Brown Evans (1812–1836), died in the Battle of the Alamo. The house was sold to Stillman Blanchard. In 1858, Blanchard went bankrupt, and the house was sold to prominent businessman Peter R. Adams.

In 1886, Adams' daughter sold the house, and it was moved from its original location on Chicago Boulevard to the current site. The interior was then converted into apartments, while the exterior remained unchanged. Today the house serves again as a single-family dwelling.

== Description ==
The house is a rectangular, two-story, five-bay, Federal style structure with a single story rear addition. Large, axe-hewn beams were used for construction, and are joined at the corners by mortise and tenon joints and locked with wooden pegs. The facade has turned-back cornice moldings, a semi- circular windows at the gable end, and a center entrance with a fan-light window above the door. The windows are regularly spaced in the facade and contain small panes.

== See also ==
- National Register of Historic Places listings in Lenawee County, Michigan
