= Brookside Cemetery (Tecumseh, Michigan) =

Historic cemetery in Michigan

- U.S. National Register of Historic Places
- Michigan State Historic Site
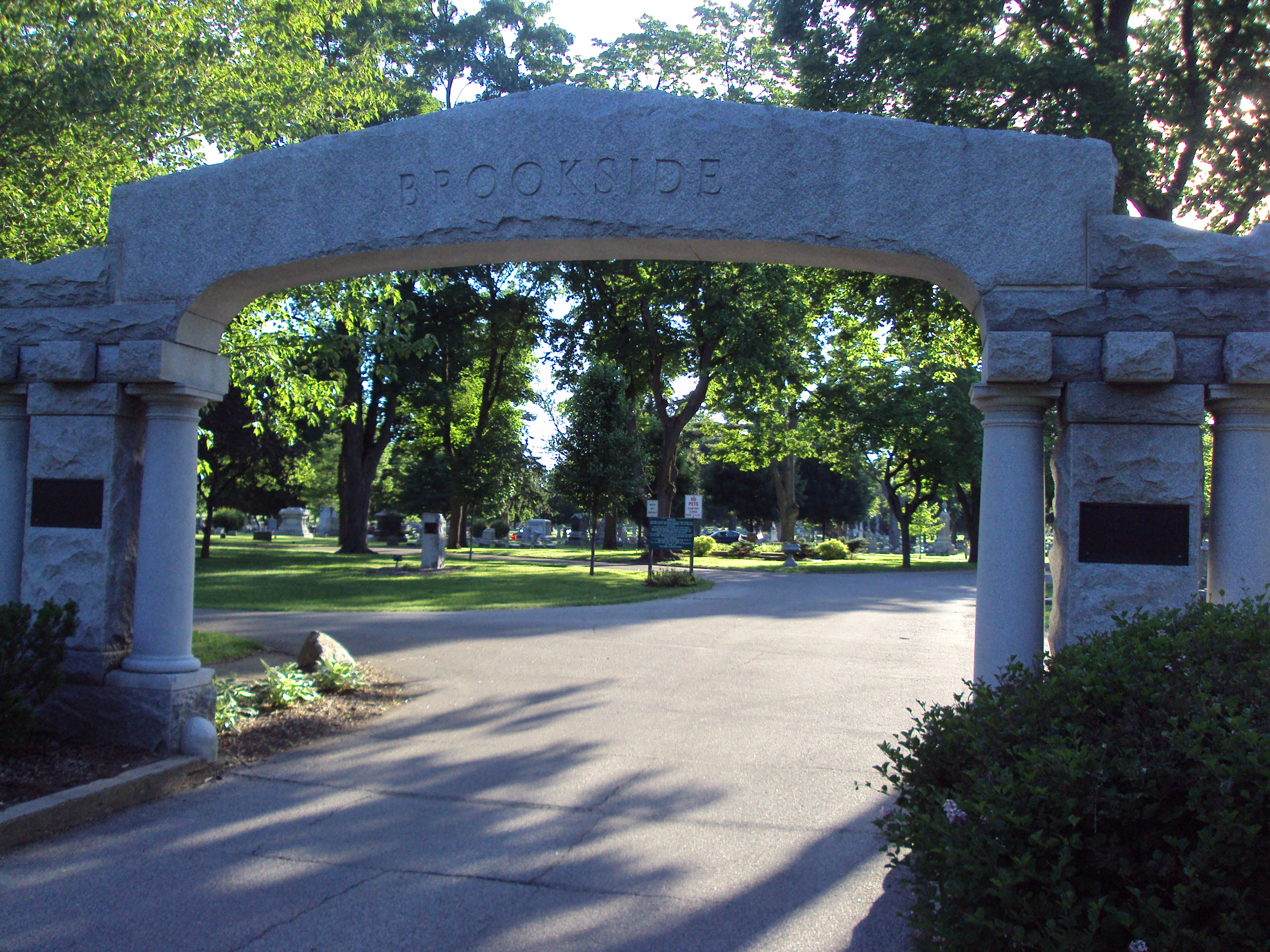
- Entrance arch to the cemetery

- Location within Michigan Location within the United States
- Interactive map
- Location: North Union Street; Tecumseh, Michigan
- Coordinates: 42°00′40″N 83°57′10″W
- Area: 25 acres (10 ha)
- Built: 1853
- MPS: Tecumseh MRA
- NRHP reference No.: 86001559
- Added to NRHP: August 13, 1986

Brookside Cemetery is a historic cemetery located along North Union Street in the city of Tecumseh in northern Lenawee County, Michigan. It was designated as a Michigan Historic Site and added to the National Register of Historic Places on August 13, 1986.

== History ==
Brookside Cemetery was set aside in 1853 as Tecumseh's primary cemetery after its original cemetery overgrew its boundaries. The original cemetery, located at the corner of South Ottawa Street and East Kilbuck Street, was abandoned, and those graves were relocated to the newly designated Brookside Cemetery. Many of Tecumseh's early settlers are buried here, including Abi Evans and Joseph W. Brown.

Although the cemetery is much larger, only 25 acres (10 hectares) is set aside as historic property by the National Register. The designated area comprises the original, rectangular plot of land that was set aside for the cemetery in 1853. In addition to graves, this property also includes an American Civil War memorial erected in 1882, a public mausoleum from 1913, and the 1915 stone arch entrance along North Union Street.

== Description ==
Brookside Cemetery is set on a level plain, covered with tall maples, pines, and various shrubs. The cemetery is bordered by a small creek. The 1915 main entryway is marked by a carved stone arch, flanked with an iron fence. Nearby, the 1913 mausoleum is constructed of stone, with a portico of Doric columns and a stained glass window. The earliest graves are laid out in straight rows, and are marked primarily with rectangular slabs. Later graves are marked with larger and more complex monuments. Monuments from the later 19th century include numerous obelisks, most under seven feet. Three large monuments along the central drive are approximately fifteen feet in height, and have elaborately detailed bases and are topped by statues of women. Most monuments are pink, grey, or black granite. There is a single zinc monument.
