= Hudson Downtown Historic District =

Historic district in Michigan, United States

- U.S. National Register of Historic Places
- U.S. Historic district
- Michigan State Historic Site
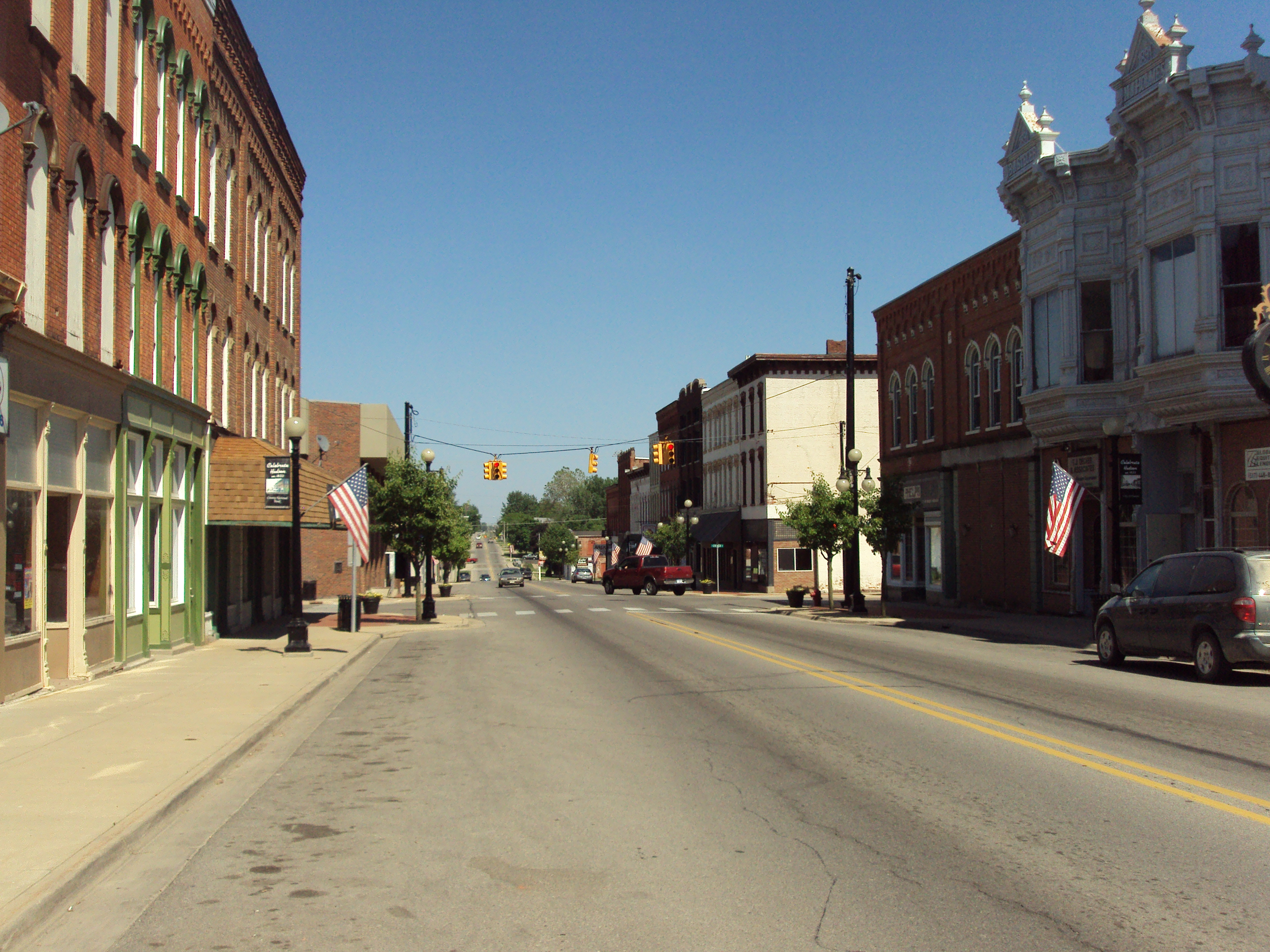
- Looking east along West Main Street (M-34)

- Location within Michigan Location within the United States
- Interactive map
- Location: Hudson, Michigan
- Coordinates: 41°51′18″N 84°21′20″W
- NRHP reference No.: 74000992

Significant dates
- Added to NRHP: December 24, 1974
- Designated MSHS: January 21, 1974

The Hudson Downtown Historic District is a historic district comprising the downtown area of the city of Hudson in westernmost Lenawee County, Michigan. It was designated as a Michigan Historic Site on January 21, 1974. It was later added to the National Register of Historic Places on December 24, 1974.

== History ==
The district traces its origins to the founding of Hudson with the arrival of the railways in 1837. Merchants opened establishments at this location on the Tiffin River in the early 1840s, and by 1853, hudson was organized as a village. Hudson served as an important trading center from 1854–1891. Most of the original wooden buildings were destroyed in a fire in 1858, and two and three story brick buildings replaced them. Another fire in 1864 destroyed much of the remaining wooden building stock. The oldest remaining building in the district is the J. K. Boise Dry Goods Company (Hudson Dry Goods) block located on the southeast corner of West Main and Church streets, which dates from 1854-1855.

== Description ==
The Hudson Downtown Historic District encompasses West Main Street (M-34) between Howard Street on the west and Market Street on the east. It extends to the north to Railroad Street and south to Seward Street. The Dr. Leonard Hall House was located at 334 West Main Street within the district, although that property has since been demolished.

The district includes fifty structures, most of which are architecturally significant representations of the kind of buildings that were commonly erected in the nineteenth century in small midwestern towns. The majority of the buildings are two- and three-story commercial structures designed to house businesses and office space. These are primarily brick, although some older frame structures still stand on Church Street.
