= Mark Temple House =

Historic house in Massachusetts, United States

- U.S. National Register of Historic Places
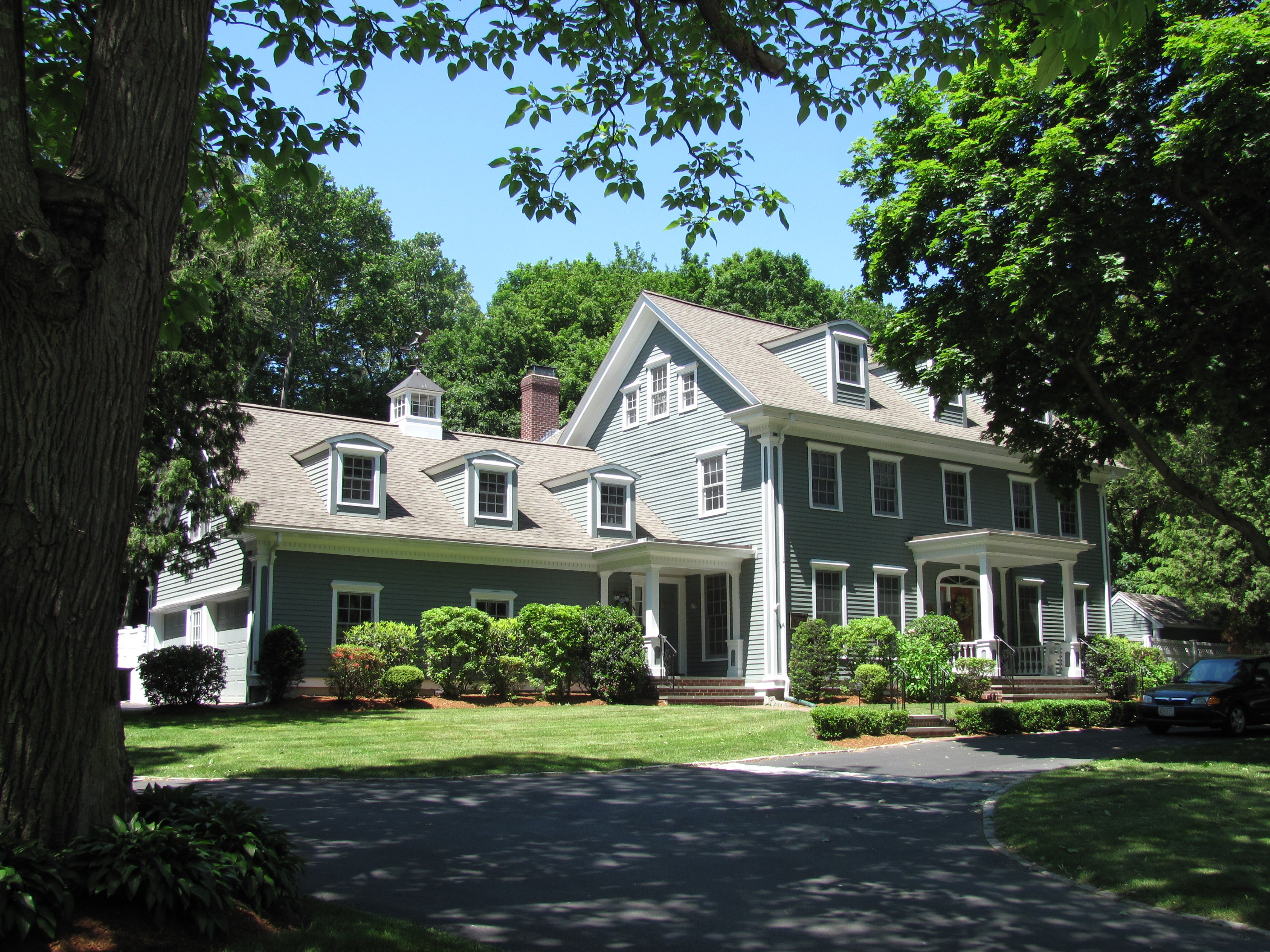
- Mark Temple House

- Location within Massachusetts Location within the United States
- Location: 141 Summer Avenue, Reading, Massachusetts
- Coordinates: 42°31′25″N 71°7′9″W
- Built: 1753
- Architectural style: Georgian
- MPS: Reading MRA
- NRHP reference No.: 84002838
- Added to NRHP: July 19, 1984

The Mark Temple House is a historic house in Reading, Massachusetts. The 2 1/2-story timber-frame house was built c. 1753 by Jonathan Temple, whose family lived all along Summer Street. In the 1850s "Uncle Mark" Temple, remodeled the Georgian style house into the Greek Revival style then still popular in Reading. Among his changes was to turn the original building 90 degrees and raise its foundation. Oscar Foote, a locally prominent real estate developer and businessman, bought the house in 1863.

The house was listed on the National Register of Historic Places in 1984.

== See also ==
- National Register of Historic Places listings in Reading, Massachusetts
- National Register of Historic Places listings in Middlesex County, Massachusetts

Massachusetts
