= Samuel W. Temple House =

Historic house in Michigan, United States

- U.S. National Register of Historic Places
- Michigan State Historic Site
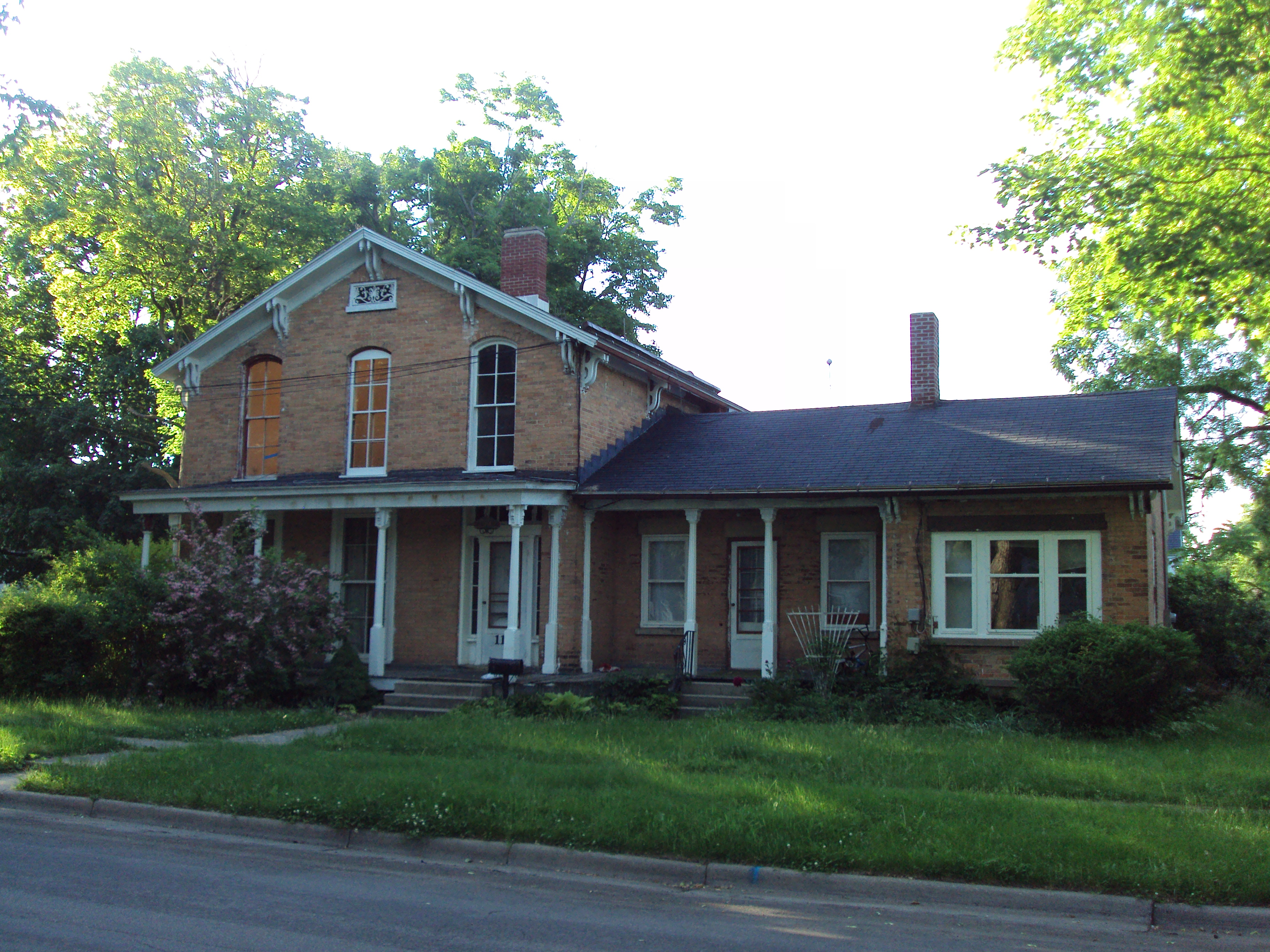

- Location within Michigan Location within the United States
- Interactive map
- Location: 115 West Shawnee Street; Tecumseh, Michigan
- Coordinates: 42°00′25″N 83°56′48″W
- Built: 1866
- Architect: Samuel W. Temple
- Architectural style: Italianate and Late Victorian
- MPS: Tecumseh MRA
- NRHP reference No.: 86001561
- Added to NRHP: August 13, 1986

The Samuel W. Temple House is a residential structure located at 115 West Shawnee Street, at the junction with North Pearl Street, in the city of Tecumseh in Lenawee County, Michigan in the United States. It was designated as a Michigan Historic Site and added to the National Register of Historic Places on August 13, 1986.

== Description ==
The house is a two-story gable roofed structure that also has a one-story wing that contains an entrance and porch. The house is an upright and wing structure that is a mix between Italianate and Late Victorian architecture.

The upright has a front porch that spans the section, which contains a front door surrounded by side and transom lights, along with two four-over-four window. On the second floor are four-over-four-light, double-hung sash windows. Above these, at the top of the gable, is a rectangular window with a decorative grille. The one-story wing has a gable roof, and the front facade contains a second, recessed porch, within which are a door with two windows. A third porch is located on one side of the house. All three porches are supported by turned posts on square bases. A bay window formerly located in the wing section has been removed some time in the 20th century.

== History ==
The house was built around 1866 by local lumber merchant Samuel W. Temple, who was a leading businessman in Tecumseh. Temple arrived in Tecumseh in 1859 from Vermont, and established a series of wood-product factories. He operated his lumberyard and furniture-making business right next door to his house. The house was currently unoccupied and in disrepair until it was purchased by new owners in 2013, who are fully renovating it and expect to be finished in 2014.
