= Mark Temple (engineer) =

British Formula One engineer

- Occupation: Engineer
- Employer: McLaren Racing
- Known for: Formula One engineer
- Title: Technical Director - Performance

Mark Temple is a British Formula One engineer. He is currently the Technical Director - Performance for the McLaren Racing Formula One team.

== Career ==
Temple started his career in motorsport with McLaren as a Transmission Designer in 2003, he then transitioned into the Vehicle Technology Team in 2005, focusing on suspension and ride analysis. By 2008, he was working as an Assistant Test Engineer, and a year later, he joined the Race Team, taking on roles as both a Tactician and Operations Engineer.

Between 2010 and 2011, Temple served as the Performance Engineer for Lewis Hamilton. He became Hamilton's Race Engineer in 2012 from the Singapore Grand Prix onwards. In 2013, he advanced to a full-time Race Engineer, working with drivers including Sergio Perez, Kevin Magnussen, and Fernando Alonso.

In 2017, Temple shifted to a factory-based role as the Team Leader for Simulation Development and later as Principal Performance Engineer. In 2023, following a restructuring at McLaren, he founded the Car, Driver and Competitor Performance Team to better assess the team's performance against rivals. In 2024 Temple became Technical Director - Performance for McLaren, overseeing the teams Vehicle Performance, Tyres & Brakes, and Driver & Competitor departments.
