= Cambridge Junction Historic State Park =

Park in Michigan, USA

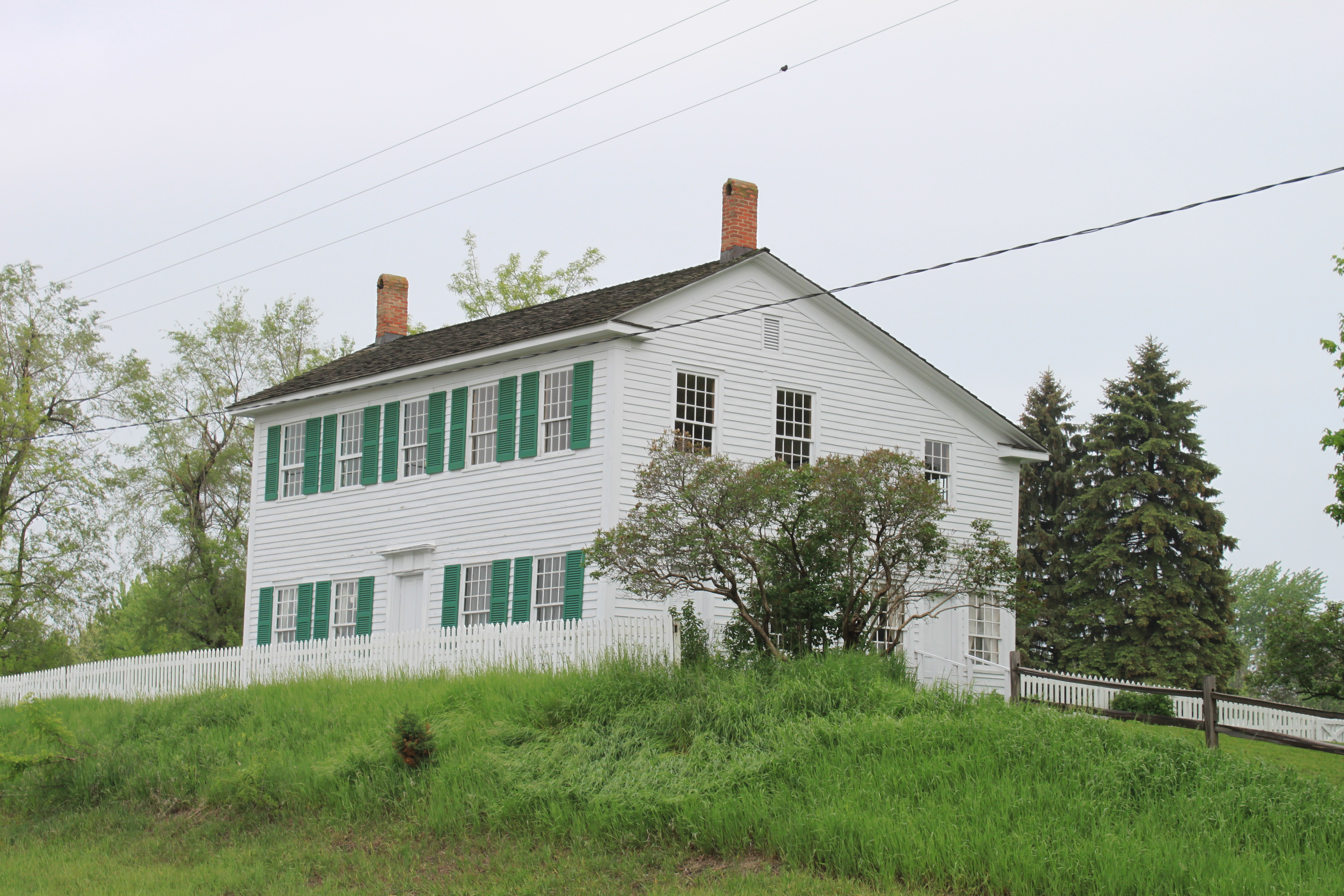
- Walker's Tavern

- Location within Michigan Location within the United States
- Interactive map of Cambridge Junction; Historic State Park
- Location: Cambridge Township, Lenawee County, Michigan, United States
- Nearest city: Brooklyn, Michigan
- Coordinates: 42°03′43″N 84°13′22″W
- Area: 80 acres (32 ha)
- Elevation: 1,004 feet (306 m)
- Established: 1965
- Administrator: Michigan Department of Natural Resources
- Designation: Michigan state park
- Website: Official website

Michigan State Historic Site
- Official name: Cambridge Junction
- Designated: February 18, 1956

Cambridge Junction Historic State Park is a historical preservation area 3 miles (4.8 km) south of Brooklyn in Cambridge Township, Michigan, that includes Walker Tavern, a major stopping place for stagecoaches traveling between Detroit and Chicago in the early nineteenth century. The tavern is operated seasonally by the Michigan History Center. The 80-acre state park includes two additional historic structures: a reconstructed barn with artifacts and exhibits about people, travel and work in the mid-19th century, and the 1929 Hewitt House Visitors Center which focuses on early auto tourism and has displays about well-known 20th-century roadside tourist attractions in the Irish Hills. Additionally, a 1-mile hiking trail encircles the park, crossing both wetlands and forested areas.
