= Tecumseh Downtown Historic District =

Historic district in Michigan, United States

- U.S. National Register of Historic Places
- U.S. Historic district
- Michigan State Historic Site
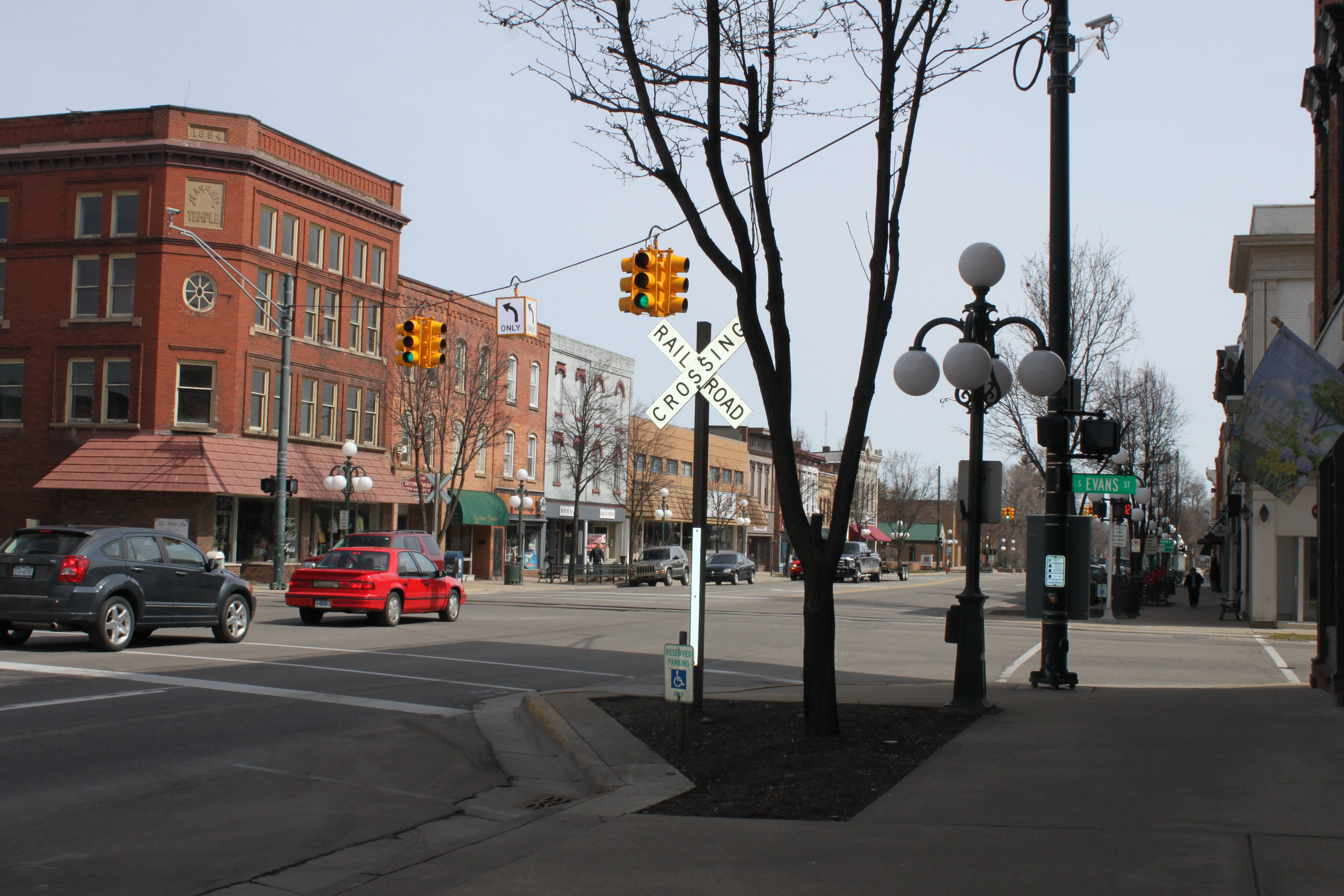
- Looking east along Chicago Boulevard

- Location within Michigan Location within the United States
- Interactive map
- Location: Tecumseh, Michigan
- Coordinates: 42°00′14″N 83°56′43″W
- Architectural style: Italianate
- NRHP reference No.: 86000805

Significant dates
- Added to NRHP: April 17, 1986
- Designated MSHS: January 16, 1976

The Tecumseh Downtown Historic District is a historic district comprising the downtown commercial area of the city of Tecumseh in Lenawee County, Michigan. It was designated as a Michigan Historic Site on January 16, 1976, and added to the National Register of Historic Places on April 17, 1986.

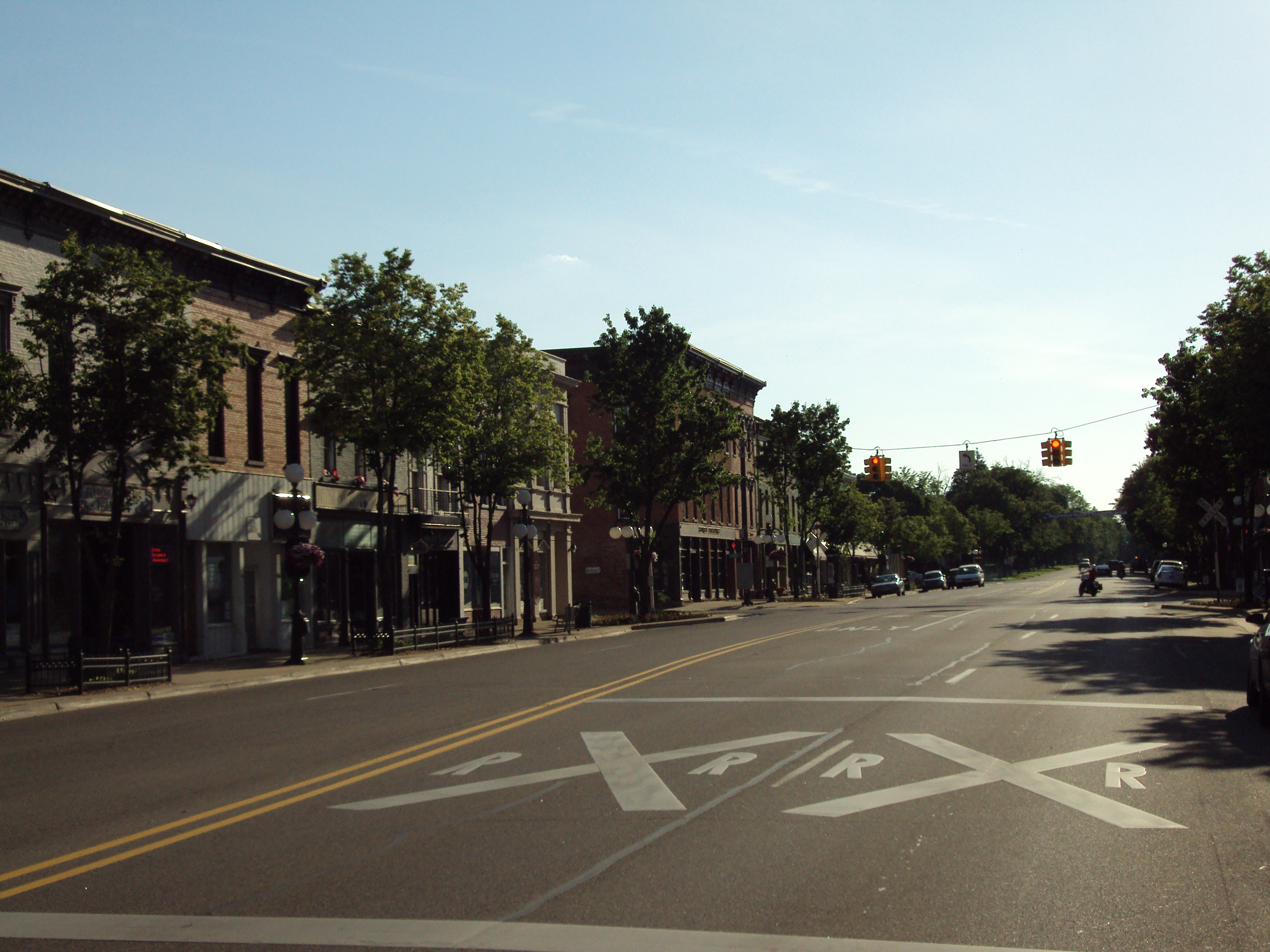
Looking west along Chicago Boulevard

Settled in as early as the 1820s, the Tecumseh Downtown Historic District centers on the intersection of Evans Street and Chicago Boulevard (M-50). Evans Street contains only two contributing properties from 115 to 125 South Evans Street, while no portions of North Evans Street north of M-50 are included in the district. The majority of the district is on M-50, consisting of 102–128 West Chicago Boulevard and 101–154 East Chicago Boulevard. There are a total of 31 contributing properties and eight non-contributing properties.

The two-block-long district consists primarily of two to four-story Italianate buildings dating primarily from 1850 to 1900. In 1824, Tecumseh pioneer Musgrove Evans platted the village with the intent of Chicago Boulevard (then known as the Chicago Road) to be the main thoroughfare through the village. After being settled, Tecumseh was designated as the county seat of the newly established Lenawee County. Its growth also relied heavily on the Lake Shore and Michigan Southern Railway line running through the area. Tecumseh developed rapidly as the county seat from 1826 to 1838. The government then moved to Adrian, and Tecumseh's expansion halted. Because of this lack of later development, much of the downtown area has been preserved. The railway line still runs through the center of the district but has long been in disuse.
