= Lampert-Wildflower House =

Historic house in Illinois, United States

- U.S. National Register of Historic Places
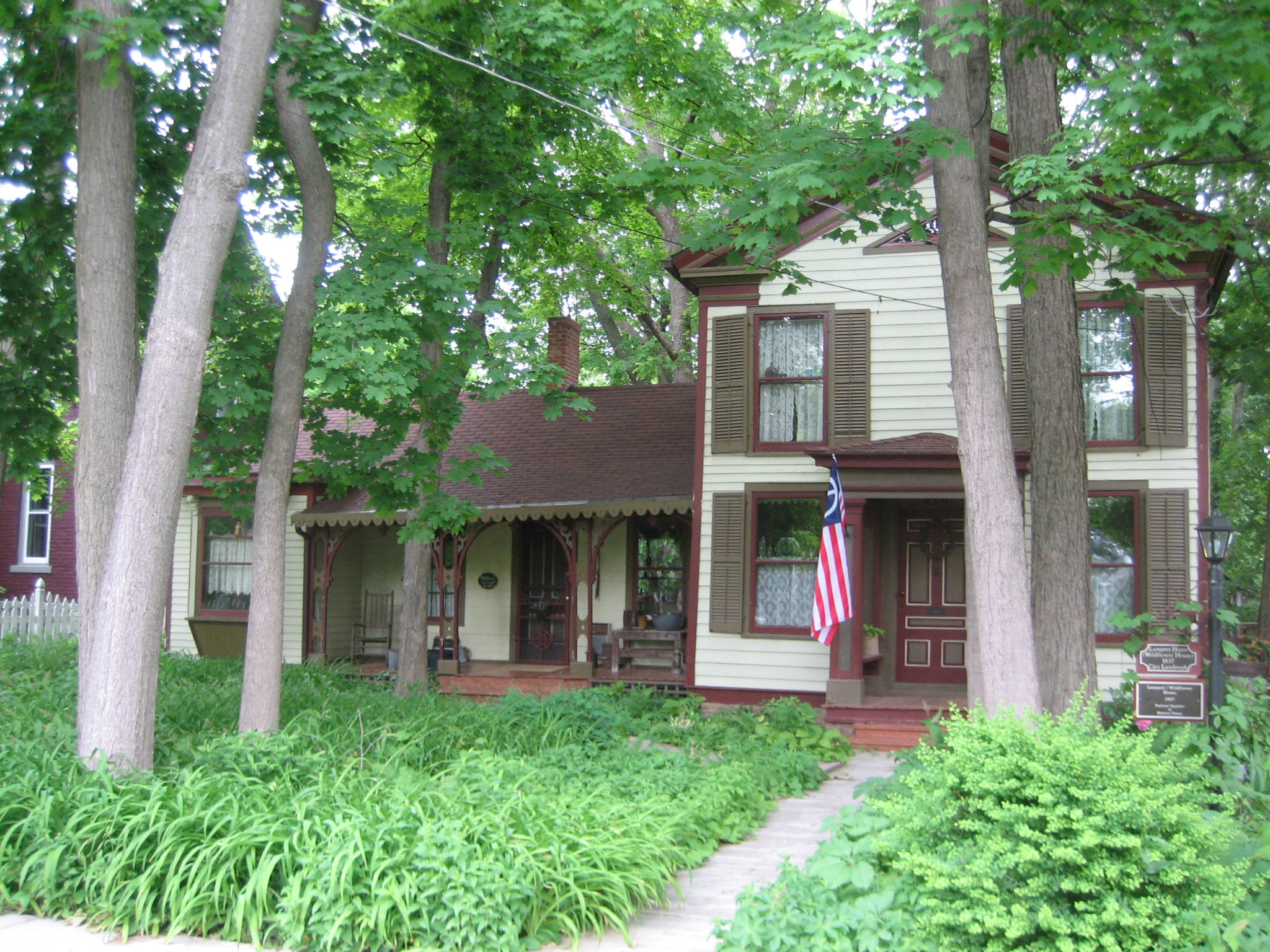

- Location within Illinois Location within the United States
- Location: 410 E. Lincoln Ave., Belvidere, Illinois
- Coordinates: 42°15′44″N 88°50′28″W
- Area: less than one acre
- Built: 1838
- Architect: Seth S. Whitman (builder); unknown
- Architectural style: Upright and Wing
- NRHP reference No.: 05000870
- Added to NRHP: August 12, 2005

The Lampert-Wildflower House is a home in the U.S. city of Belvidere, Boone County, Illinois. The main, upright, portion of the house was constructed in 1838 and the wing section was added to the home during the 1860s. It passed through the hands of several owners until it was purchased by Phillip C. Lampert who is responsible for the wildflower-covered lawn. The property contains five types of rare plants and is semi-wooded, shaded by 32 trees. The home is a distinct example of Upright and Wing construction, though it retains some elements of the Greek Revival style it was originally designed in. The wing section of the house features a front porch decorated with Gothic Revival and Queen Anne-style elements. The house was listed on the U.S. National Register of Historic Places for its architectural significance in 2005.

== History ==
The original trio of property owners of the Lampert-Wildflower House site were, according to records, Aaron Whitney, Daniel H. Whitney and Dan Caswell. Seth S. Whitman, originally from Vermont, purchased the property in 1838 and constructed the house where he stayed until 1844. Whitman played an early, active role in the Belvidere community. He became the community's first resident pastor when he was named Reverend of Belvidere's first church, organized on July 24, 1836. He was also the first teacher at the city's first school in 1838, Newton Academy, located a few blocks from the Lampert-Wildflower House. By 1840, Whitman was named Belvidere's first postmaster as well as Boone County's first circuit clerk and recorder. In October 1846, Whitman stepped down as Reverend at the local church because of ill-health. He left the Belvidere area in June 1851 for the Baptist Church in Madison, Wisconsin; Whitman died there on January 2, 1852.

From the years 1844 until 1853 the house was owned by several different individuals, including Colonel Joel E. Walker. In 1853 the house was bought by Ezra May. May stayed in the home until 1886 and it was during his ownership that the house underwent the first of two significant alterations. During the 1860s May added the balloon-framed wing section of the home; this section of the house rests upon a brick foundation. May was another prominent Belvidere citizen. May held office as "School Director," and "Town Trustee," and later owned a flour mill and served as president of a local bank. After 1886 the house was owned by a local educator, about whom little is known today, John Christian Zinzer. Zinzer owned the Lampert-Wildflower House until he sold it to a friend from Forreston, Illinois, Phillip C. Lampert on September 11, 1891.

During the Lamperts' ownership of the house the Queen Anne detailing was added to the wing section of the house, probably before Phillip Lampert's 1899 death. Lampert was born in Forreston but had moved to Belvidere by 1866. In 1875 Lampert began to teach school and by 1883 he had been admitted to the Illinois Bar. In 1889, after working in a law office in Chicago for a year, Lampert returned to Belvidere to open his own law and abstract office. On April 15, 1891, he married Clara Pape in Madison, Wisconsin. The couple purchased the Lampert-Wildflower House about five months later. Clara Lampert (née Pape) was born and educated in Forreston and graduated high school in 1887, for a short time after that she taught school in Ogle County, Illinois. She began working in Lampert's abstract office in Belvidere a short time after teaching, the law office opened in 1889. After Phillip Lampert died on December 5, 1899, Clara and her daughter Muriel (born March 28, 1892) were left poor. Clara continued her husband's abstract business and on February 2, 1900, she was appointed Deputy Clerk of Boone County, Muriel joined her in that office in 1912.

The Lampert-Wildflower House remained in the Lampert family until long after Phillip Lampert's death. Clara Lampert died in 1962 and her daughter Muriel died in 1972. Muriel Lampert left the house to local historians Bessie and Emmett Sullivan; the house stood empty until Bessie Sullivan's died in 1986. In 1986 two men from Grand Prairie, Illinois bought the house and ended up selling it in 1988 to Sherry and Gary Knott-Simon, who set about restoring the home while maintaining its historic character and integrity. The house was added to the National Register of Historic Places for its local and architectural significance as a typical example of Upright and Wing style on August 12, 2005.

== Architecture ==
The home is a detailed example of Upright and Wing construction, which is a type of non-stylistic, vernacular architecture. The Lampert-Wildflower House began as a front gabled, Greek-Revival style home. In the 1860s, with the addition of the wing section the home was transformed from the Greek Revival style that was popular when it was originally constructed to the Upright and Wing style, though it still displays some Greek Revival elements including the cornice lines on its front gable. The wing section stretches out from the upright, gabled section of the home and is a two-room, one-and-a-half story extension to the original home. The porch which adorns the south elevation of the wing features Carpenter Gothic detailing.

== Grounds ==
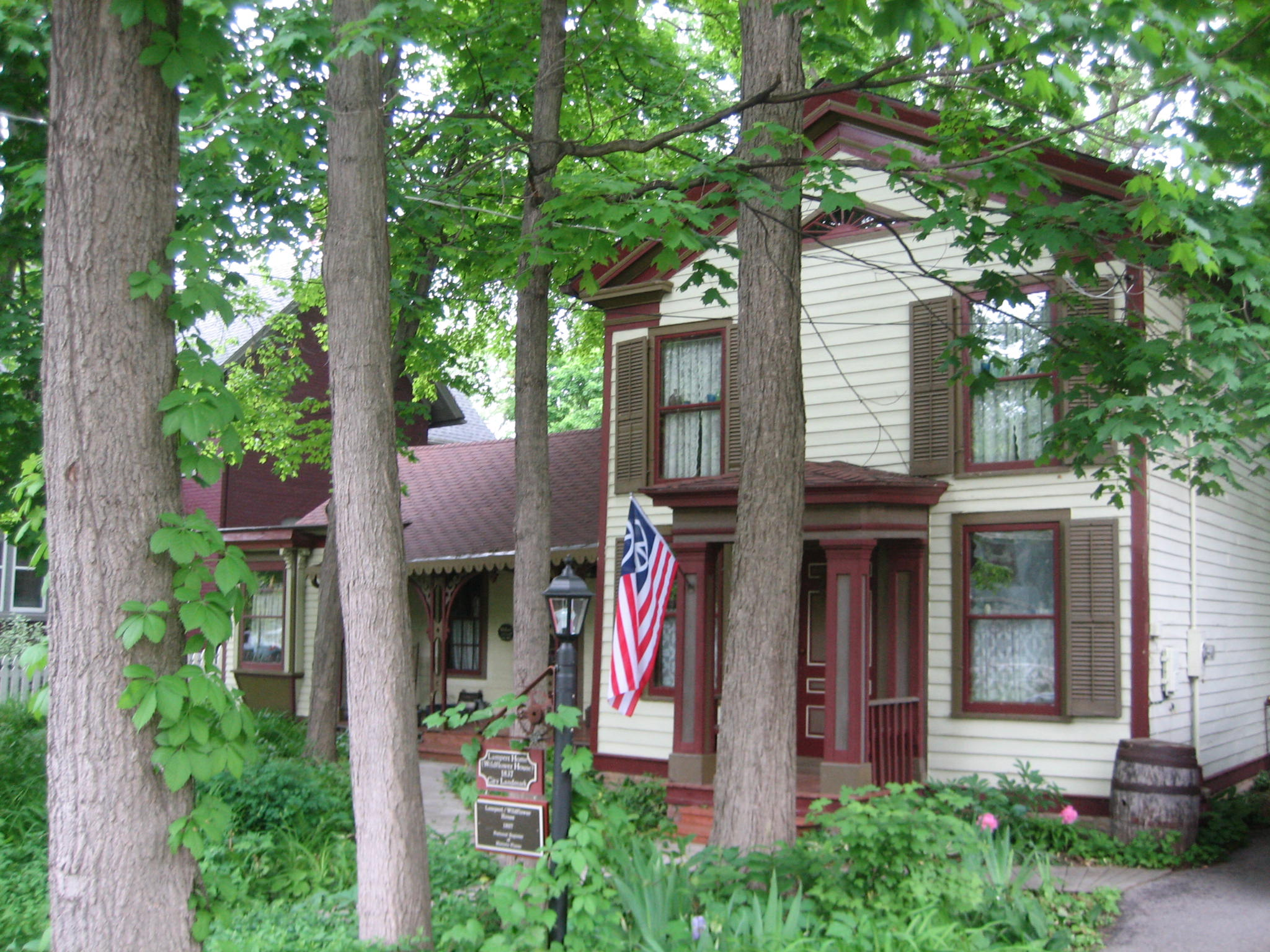
The semi-wooded lawn of the Wildflower House is home to 32 trees and 36 types of plants.

The U.S. National Register of Historic Places listing for the Lampert-Wildflower House included the surrounding yard, which maintains its historical integrity. The Lamperts, as naturalists, kept the lawn as a haven for birds and wildflowers. Today, the yard maintains its historic appearance; the front and back yards are planted with wildflowers instead of grass and the whole site is semi-wooded. Most of the 32 trees on the less than 1-acre (4,000 m^{2}) site are black walnut and maple. Several endangered plant species are found in the yard as well as prairie and woodland plants of other types.

According to Jerry Paulson, with the Natural Land Institute in Rockford, Illinois, there are five kinds of "rare" plants found in the Wildflower House yard. They are: Canadian violet, ginseng, prairie smoke, bellwort, and yellow violet. Other, common, types of plants found in the yard include wild grape, purple coneflower, ginger, scilla, ferns, and jack-in-the-pulpit. In total, 36 different types of plants (not including the trees) have been identified on the Lampert-Wildflower lawn.
