= Clark Memorial Hall =

- U.S. National Register of Historic Places
- U.S. Historic district – Contributing property
- Michigan State Historic Site
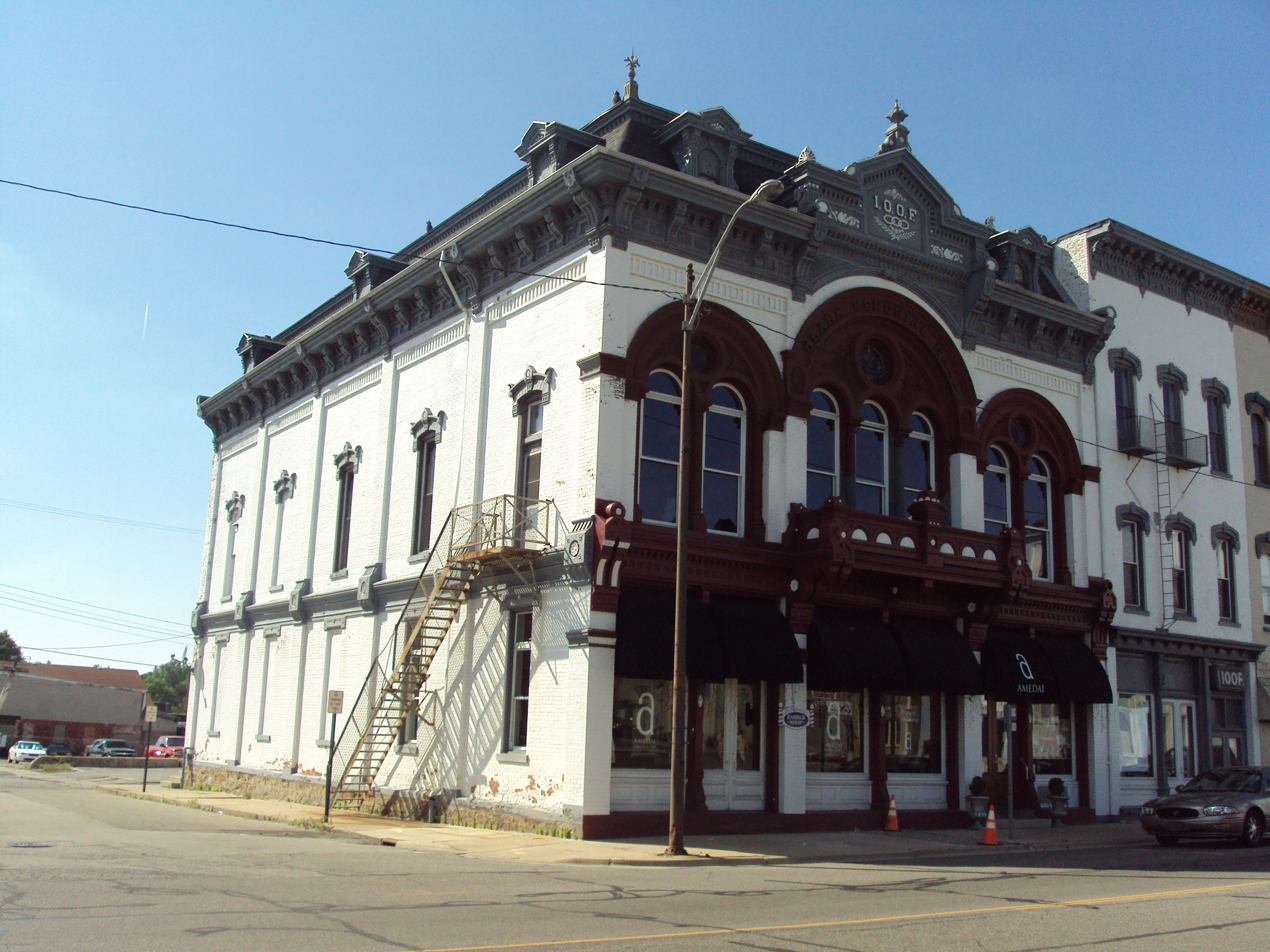

- Location within Michigan Location within the United States
- Map showing the location of Clark Memorial Hall
- Location: 120–124 S. Winter Street; Adrian, Michigan
- Coordinates: 41°53′55″N 84°02′18″W
- Built: 1888
- Part of: Downtown Adrian Commercial District
- NRHP reference No.: 85000097
- Added to NRHP: January 14, 1985

The Clark Memorial Hall, also known as the Adrian I.O.O.F. Hall, is a commercial building located at 120–124 South Winter Street (M-52) in the Downtown Adrian Commercial Historic District in Adrian, Michigan. It was designated as a Michigan Historic Site and individually listed on the National Register of Historic Places on January 14, 1985.

== History ==
Elihu C. Clark was born in Walworth, New York in 1811, and began a career as a dry goods merchant in 1830. In 1836, he moved to Adrian and established a dry goods business there. A few years later he began dabbling in finance, and by 1847 he was an important and wealthy local financier. In 1869 Clark, became the first president of the Lenawee County Savings Bank. Clark died in 1880, and his will, he donated $10,000 to the Adrian Lodge of the Odd Fellowship — a branch of the Independent Order of Odd Fellows — to construct a building.

By 1888, the Lodge had acquired land and additional capital to construct a building. The lodge hired to local firm of Beck and Vogt to construct the building for a cost of $9,000. Construction started in June, and the structure was completed by the end of 1888. The Odd Fellows held their first meeting in the new hall in January 1889. The first floor was leased by Moreland Brothers and Crane, a tobacco and candy company.

In 1986, dwindling membership forced the building to be put up for sale. Today, it serves a variety of commercial businesses.

== Description ==
Clark Memorial Hall is a two-story rectangular structure, measuring approximately 46 feet by 75 feet, located on a corner lot. The building has a mansard roof. The main facade is three bays wide, and is constructed of orange-red brick with a grey limestone water table and cast iron facade and entablature ornamentation. The first floor was designed to house two stores, and contains two doorways and large windows. The second floor housed the Odd Fellows lodge, and is relatively tall in comparison to the first floor. Cast and galvanized iron ornamentation forms a symmetrical arched facade above the windows. The windows are double-hung one-over-one units, set in pairs on each side ind in a triple in the center. Above each window group is a round stained glass window. Above the center arch are the words CLARK MEMORIAL HALL in raised iron letters.

The building bears a striking resemblance to the Tibbits Opera House in Coldwater, Michigan.
