= Adrian Public Library =

- U.S. National Register of Historic Places
- U.S. Historic district – Contributing property
- Michigan State Historic Site
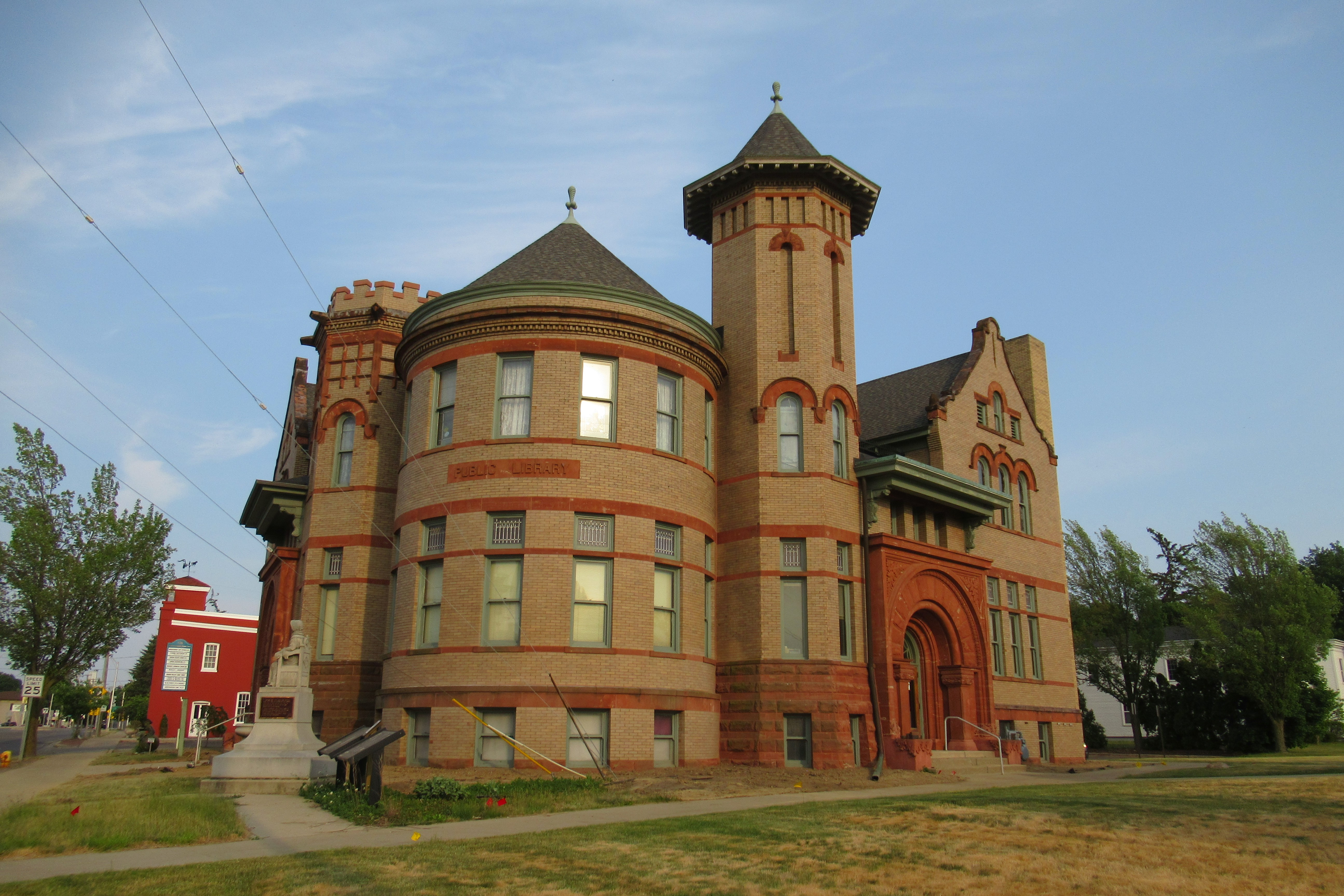
- Adrian Public Library in 2023

- Location within Michigan Location within the United States
- Interactive map
- Location: 110 E. Church Street; Adrian, Michigan
- Coordinates: 41°53′49″N 84°02′13″W
- Built: 1909
- Architect: Paul O. Moratz
- Architectural style: Richardsonian Romanesque, Mission Revival, Spanish Colonial Revival
- Part of: Downtown Adrian Commercial District
- NRHP reference No.: 77000719

Significant dates
- Added to NRHP: December 6, 1977
- Designated MSHS: December 14, 1976

The Adrian Public Library is a historic structure located at 110 East Church Street in downtown Adrian, Michigan. Originally used as a library, it was designated as a Michigan Historic Site on December 14, 1976, and later listed on the National Register of Historic Places on December 6, 1977. It is located within the Downtown Adrian Commercial Historic District and adjacent to the Adrian Engine House No. 1. Today, the building houses the Lenawee County Historical Society Museum.

== History ==
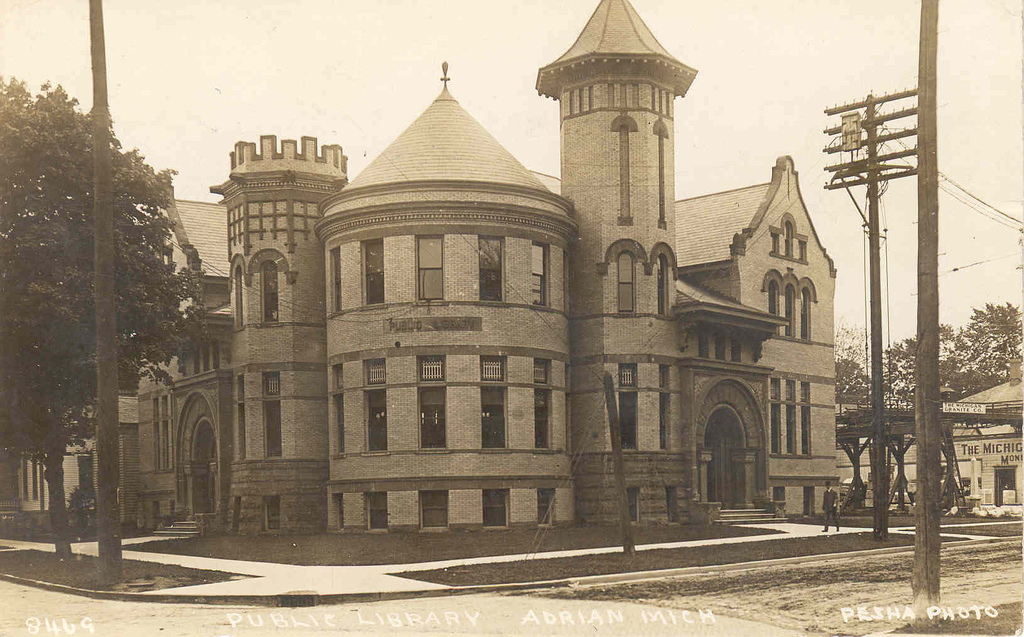
The library as it appeared in 1909

Although the library branch dates back to 1868, its first independent library structure was completed in 1909 with a $27,500 grant from the Andrew Carnegie Library Fund in addition to $5,000 donated by the city. Illinois architect Paul O. Moratz designed the library, and it was completed by local contractor C. F. Matthes. The building was designed to hold a public library as well as an art gallery and lecture auditorium.

It was formally dedicated and opened on February 5, 1909, and was used as a school district library until it transferred ownership to the city in 1915. When the building itself became insufficient, a new location at 143 East Maumee Street opened on June 12, 1978, and remains in operation. The old location passed through several owners before being given back to the city. The building is used to house the Lenawee County Historical Society Museum.

== Description ==
The building is 2½ stories and built with a mix of Mission Revival Style, Spanish Colonial Revival, and Richardsonian Romanesque architecture. It is constructed of brick and sandstone, and measures 70 feet by 70 feet. Standing on a corner lot, the building has two main entrance facades. Both entryway are through massive arches, 18 feet high and 17 feet wide, trimmed with carved sandstone. Near each entryway is a tower, one rising 66 feet and the other 44 feet. A semi-circular room pushes outward on the corner between the towers.

On the interior, a first floor lobby with coved ceiling connects the entrances. Two other large rectangular rooms are on the first floor, along with the semicircular room and two rooms in the bases of the towers. The second floor has the same floor plan.
