= Adrian Engine House No. 1 =

Historic fire station in Michigan, US

- U.S. National Register of Historic Places
- U.S. Historic district – Contributing property
- Michigan State Historic Site
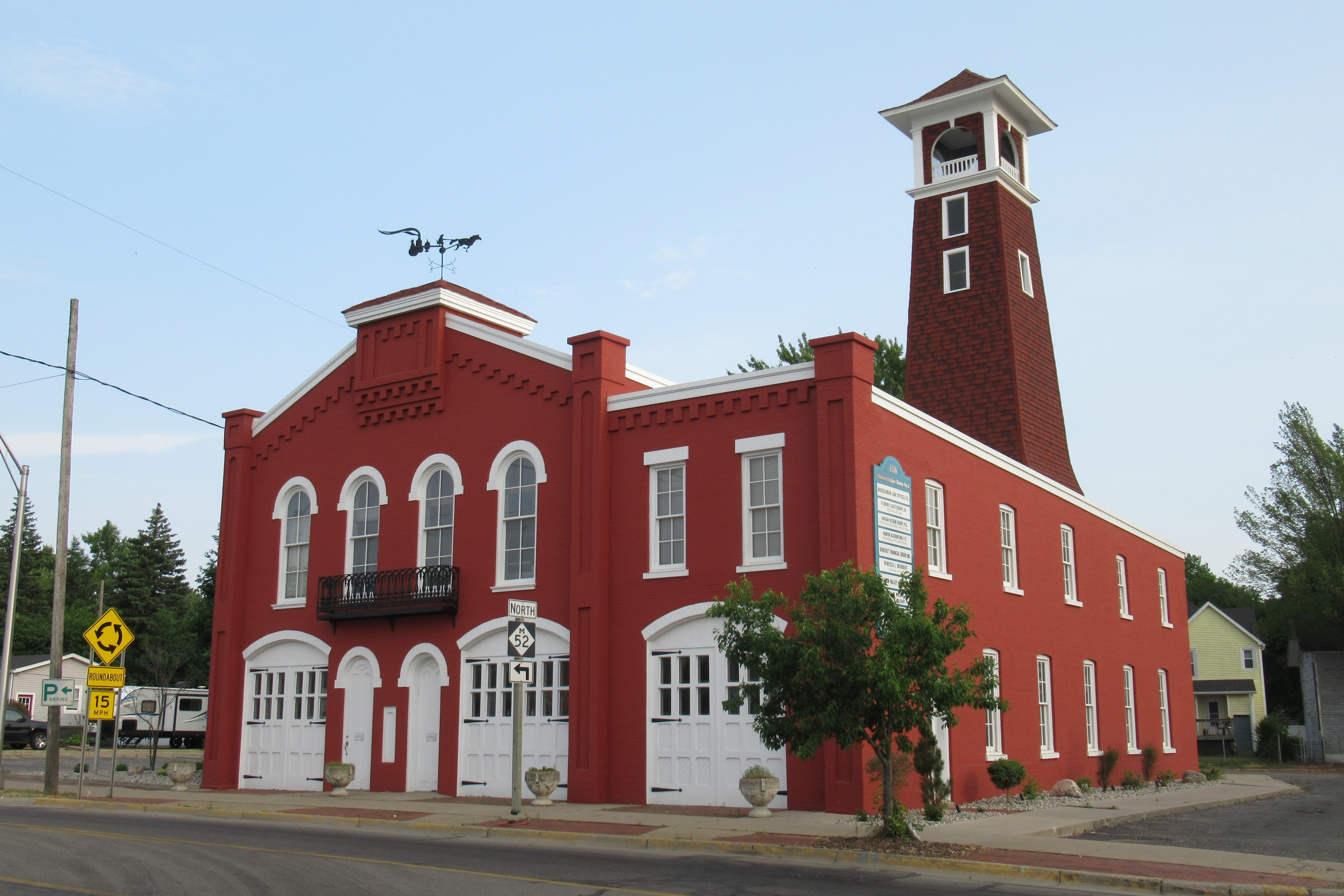

- Location within Michigan Location within the United States
- Interactive map
- Location: 126 East Church Street; Adrian, Michigan
- Coordinates: 41°53′50″N 84°02′11″W
- Built: 1855
- Architectural style: Romanesque Revival, Italianate
- Part of: Downtown Adrian Commercial District
- NRHP reference No.: 89000789
- Added to NRHP: August 21, 1989

The Adrian Engine House No. 1 is a historic fire station located at 126 East Church Street in downtown Adrian, Michigan. It was designated as a Michigan Historic Site and listed on the National Register of Historic Places on August 21, 1989. It is located within the Downtown Adrian Commercial Historic District and next to the Adrian Public Library.

== History ==
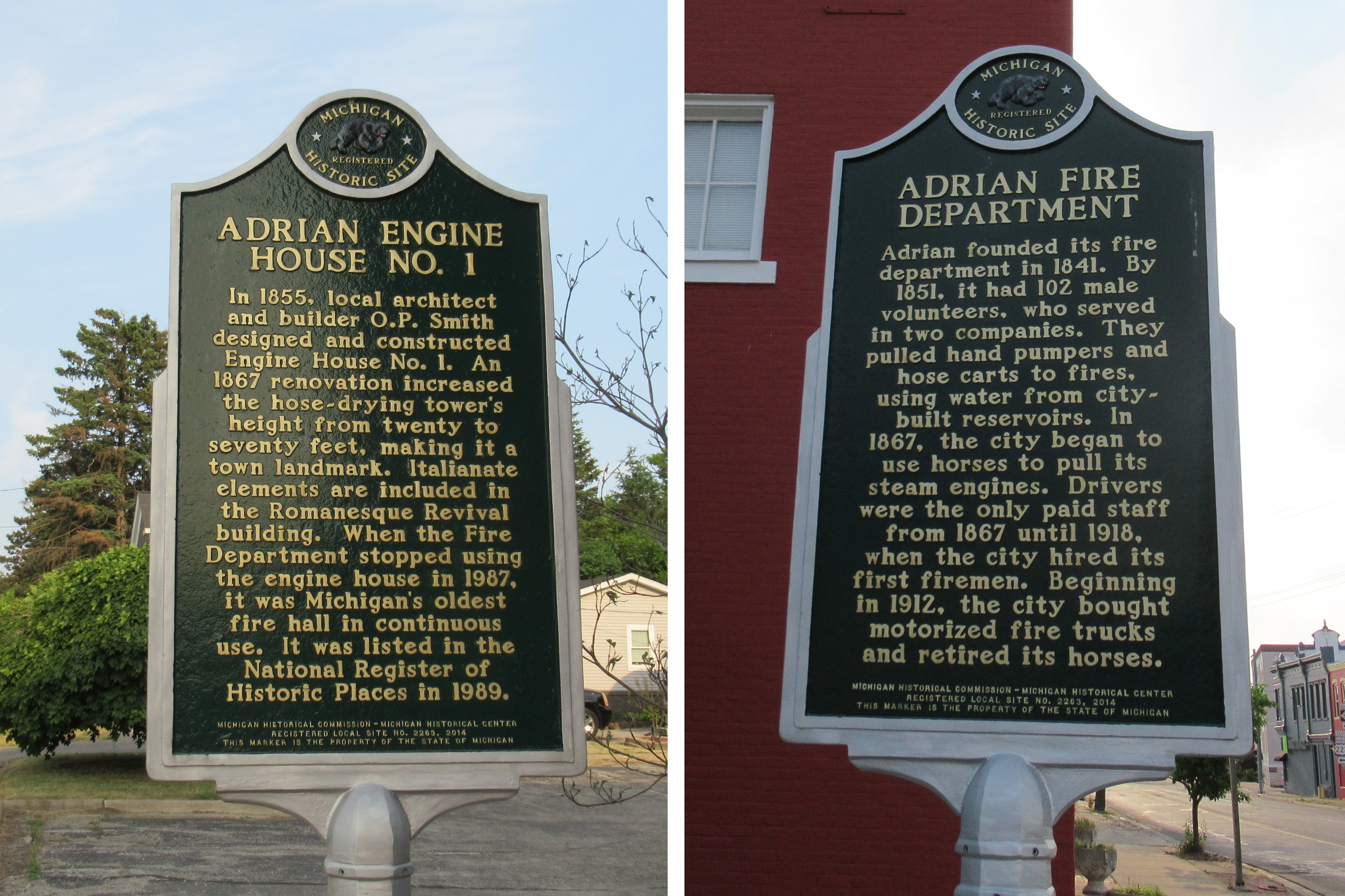
Both sides of the state historic marker

The Adrian Fire Department dates back to 1841, with the formation of a volunteer company. A second company was founded in 1845, and by 1851 the two companies had over 100 volunteers. In 1855, construction began on this fire station to house Engine Company #1. It was put into service early in 1856. In 1867, the city went to a full-time fire department, and purchased new steam equipment and horses to pull it, necessitating the addition of stables to the building and other changes to house the equipment. In 1877, an addition directly abutting the engine house was constructed to house new equipment.

In 1912-14, new motorized equipment was purchased to replace the horse-drawn equipment. In 1917, the two companies in the city were consolidated into this building. Concrete floors were added in 1932. The fire station was used by the city until 1987, making it the oldest continuously operating fire station in Michigan when it closed. After that, the building was internally restructured into retail office space, while the outside had remained unchanged. It is currently occupied by the Adrian Design Group.

== Description ==
The Adrian Engine House is constructed mostly of bricks mixed with a few later additions made of wood. It was built with a mixture of Romanesque Revival and Italianate architecture. The main feature of the fire station is a landmark tower once used for drying the fire hoses. At 70 feet (21 m) tall, it is one of the tallest structures in the city.

The front facade has a gabled parapet with a hip-roofed wood belfry at the center of the facade. The second floor contains four arched windows, and vehicular doors below are also of arched brick.
