= Upright and Wing =

American vernacular architectural style

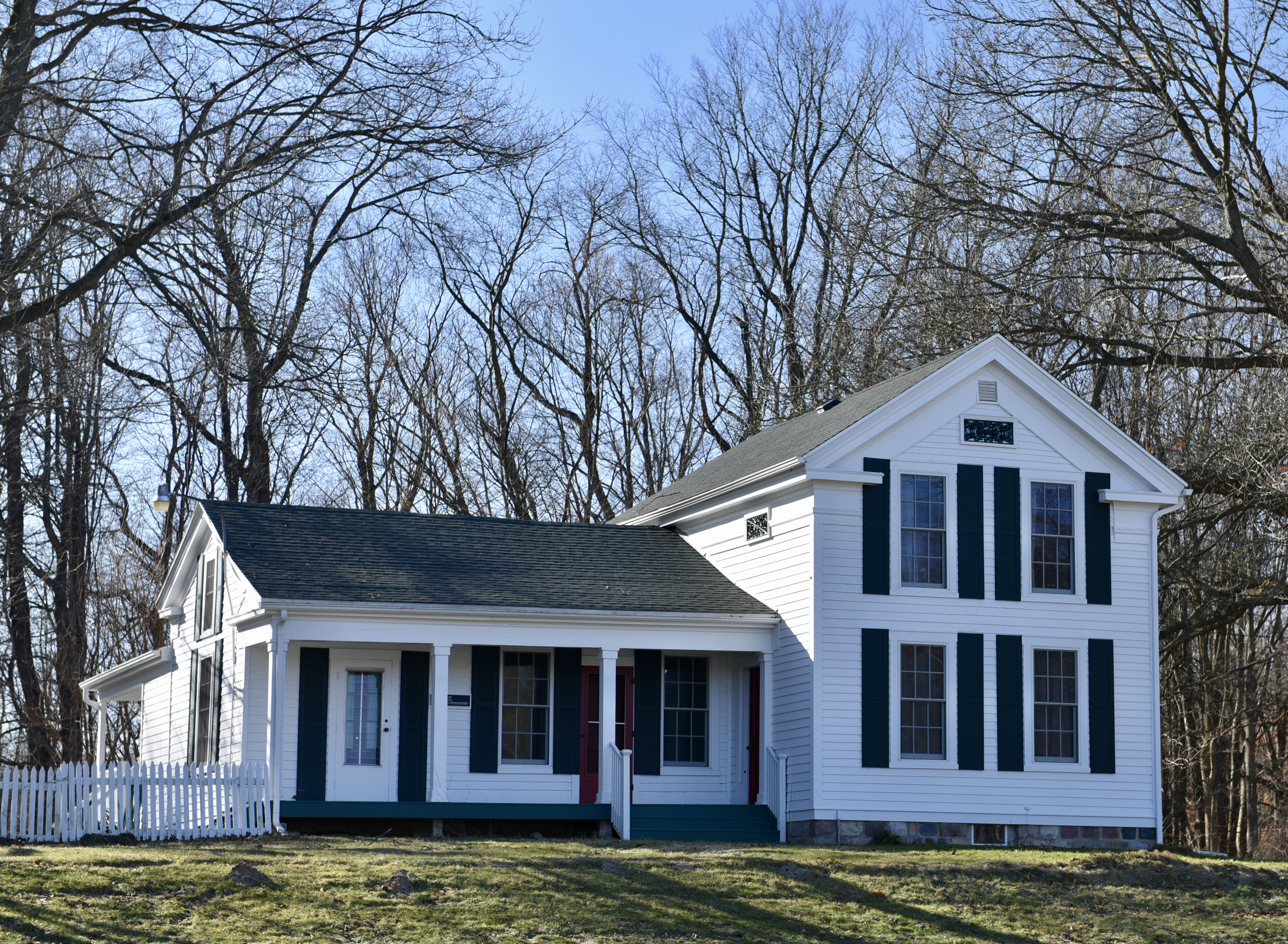
This 1852 Greek Revival Michigan example features the main entrance on the ell or "wing".

Upright and Wing, also referred to as Temple and Wing or Gable and Wing, is a residential architectural style found in American vernacular architecture of New England and the Upper Midwest, specifically associated with the American Greek Revival. It was popular from the mid- to late 19th century and is typified by a gable ended "upright" section, usually two stories, and a one-story ell or "wing" section.

== Characteristics and elements ==
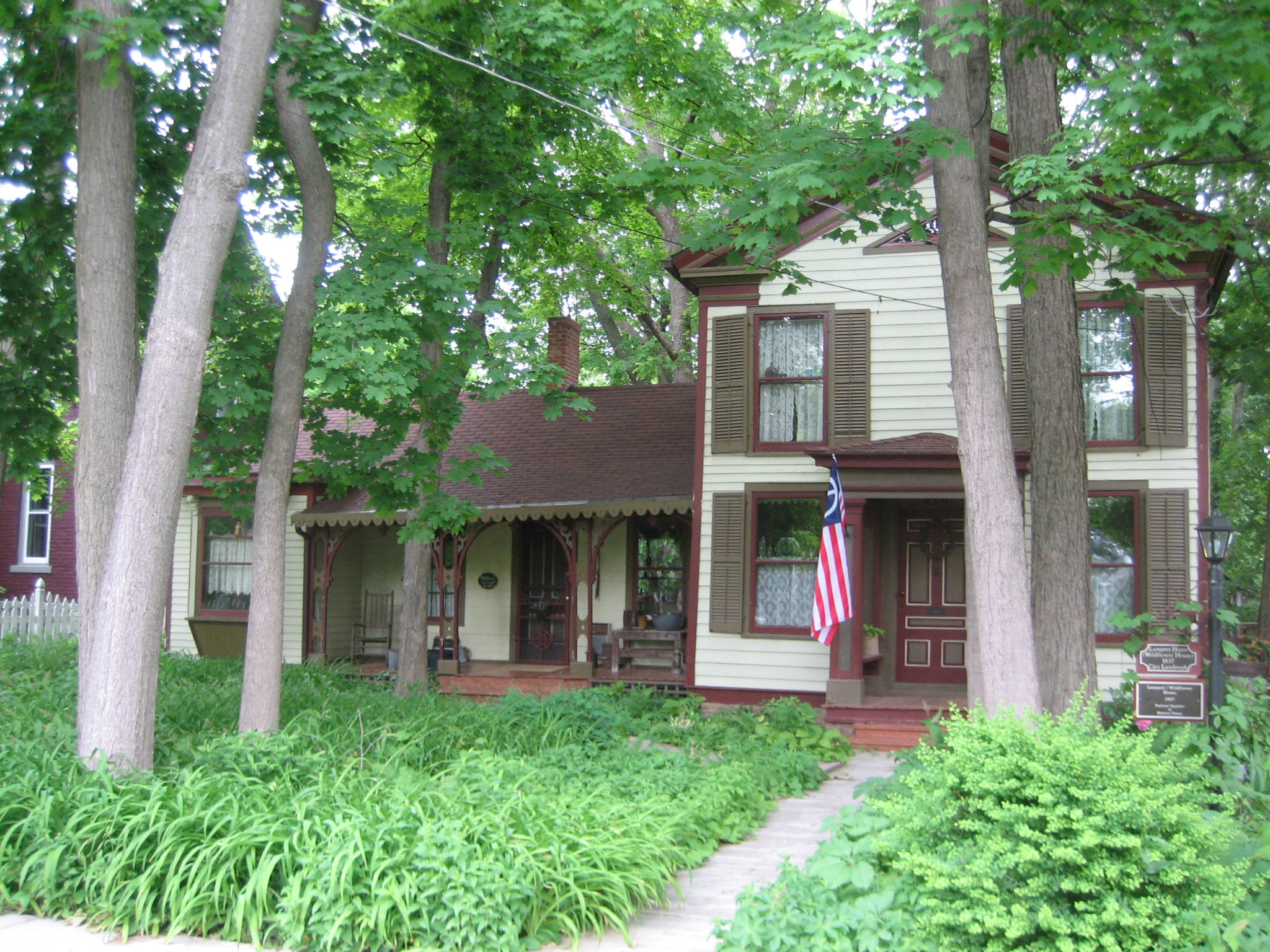
This 1830s example features the main entrance on the upright portion.

As a type of non-stylistic folk architecture, Upright and Wing houses were generally designed and built by tradesmen as opposed to the owners of the houses. Most Upright and Wing houses are characterized by four main traits. Nearly all are 1½–2 stories, gable roofed, and feature a vertical upright portion that is usually two stories and a perpendicular side section known as the wing. The wing is an ell that is generally 1 story but can be the same height as the upright section.

Though usually non-stylistic, there are minor variations within the style. Upright and Wing houses were laid out in either an L-plan or T-plan. The ell usually has bedrooms and the kitchen while the upright holds a parlor, staircase, and additional bedrooms. Early examples (c.1830–50) have the main entry on the upright portion of the house. Post-1850 examples usually shifted the entryway to the ell portion of the house.

Upright and Wing enjoyed a lengthy period of popularity which partially coincided with the popularity of Greek Revival architecture in the United States. Thus, Upright and Wing houses are often adorned with pilasters, cornice returns and wide entablatures.

== Prominence ==
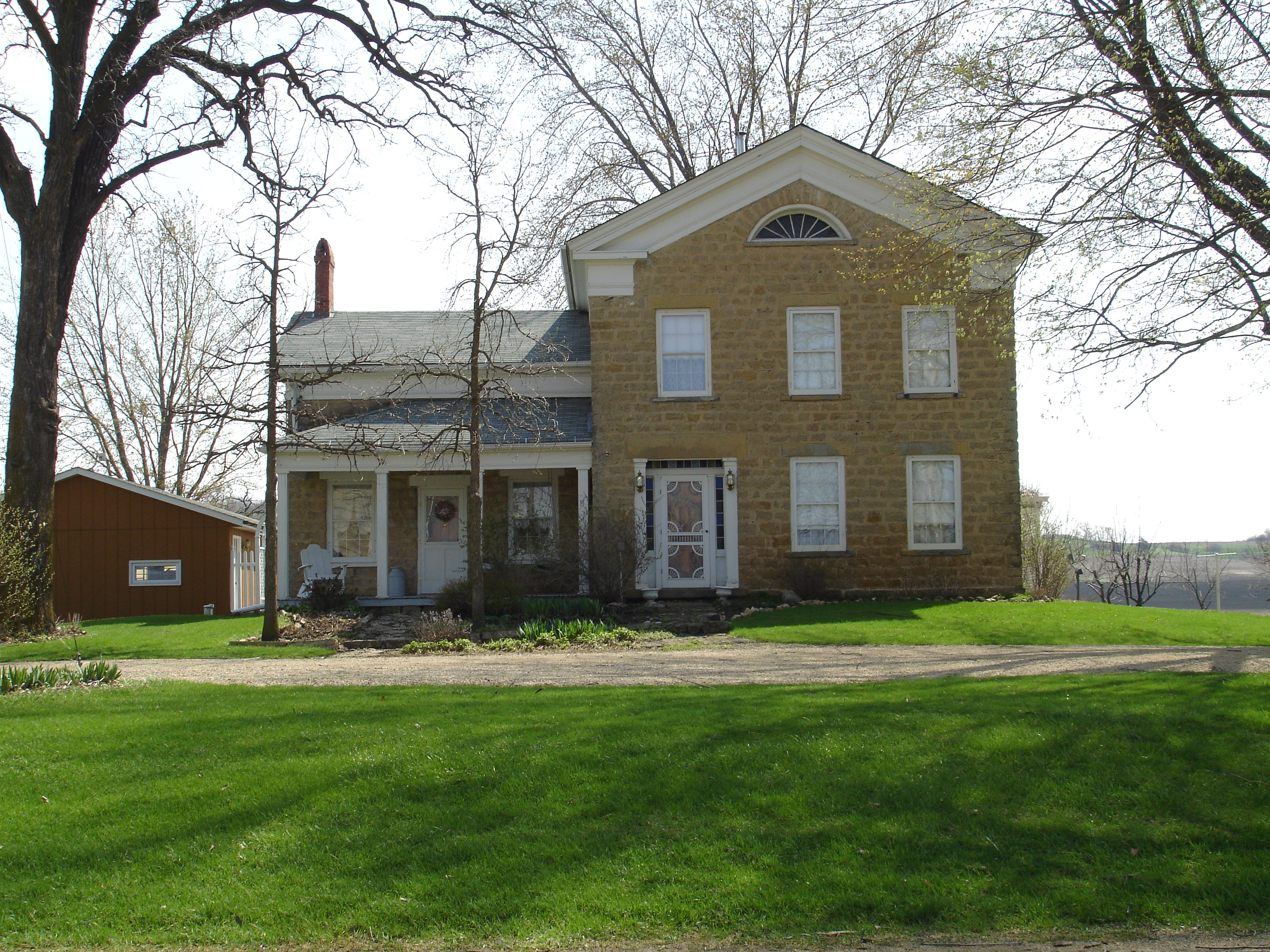
This Illinois example has entrances on both sections.

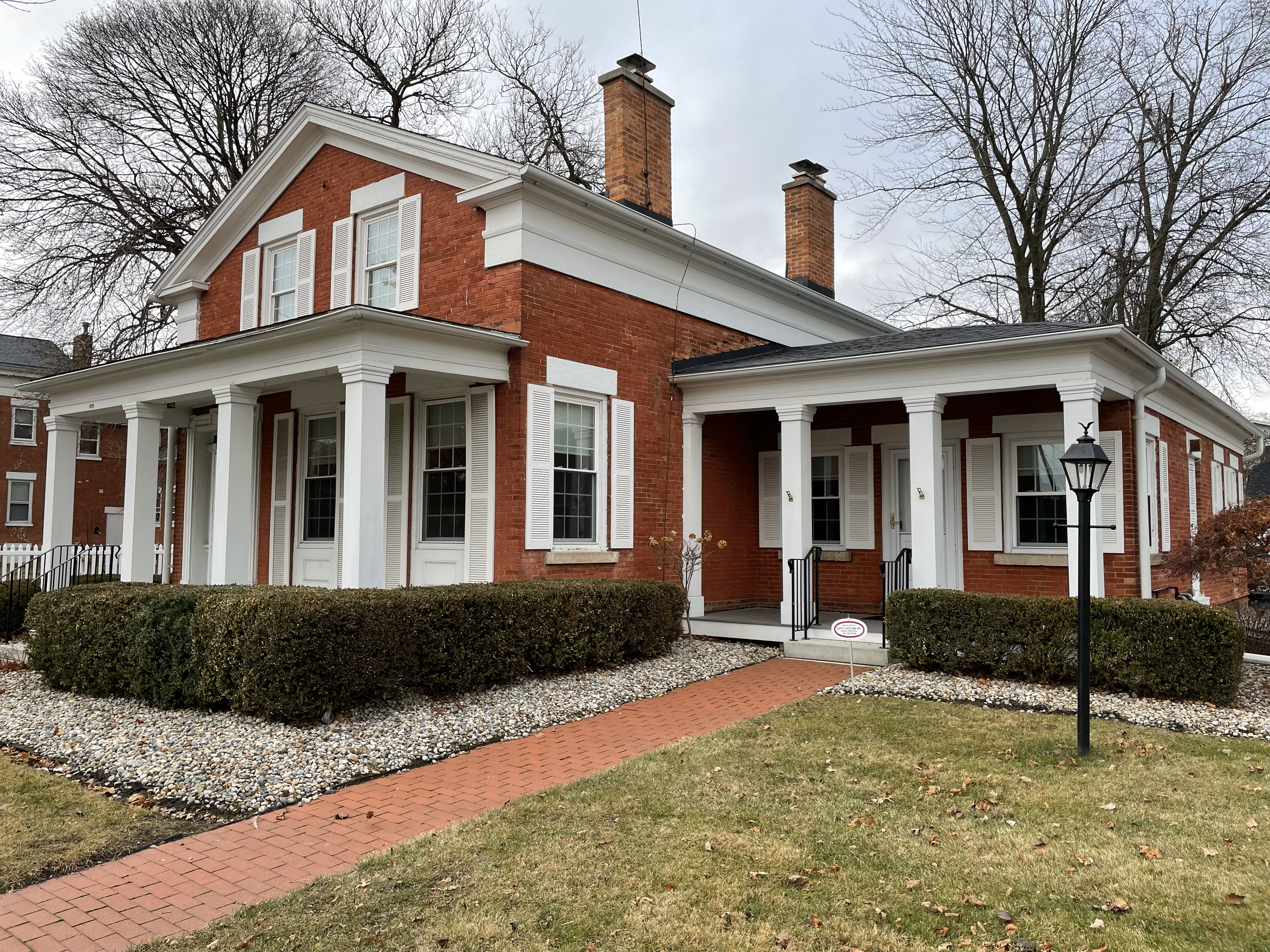
Governor Croswell House, 228 North Broad Street, Adrian, Michigan, before 1843, built by Daniel Hicks

The Upright and Wing style was mostly associated with New England and the New Englanders who settled the Great Lakes region. A folk style that was developed for the rural settings, Upright and Wing enjoyed wide usage in both rural and urban settings. The style was popular for much of the 19th century, spanning from c. 1830 to 1890. The form is known as Temple and Wing in some academic circles.

One of the best-known examples of a gable-and-wing is the Governor Charles Croswell House in Adrian, Michigan. Croswell helped his uncle Daniel Hicks build this house in the early 1840s when he was a teenager and later purchased the home from his widowed aunt. Since 1927, the Lucy Wolcott Barnum Chapter of the National Society of the Daughters of the American Revolution has maintained the home as their local chapter meeting house.

== See also ==
- Gablefront house
