= Sparks-Anderson House =

- U.S. National Register of Historic Places
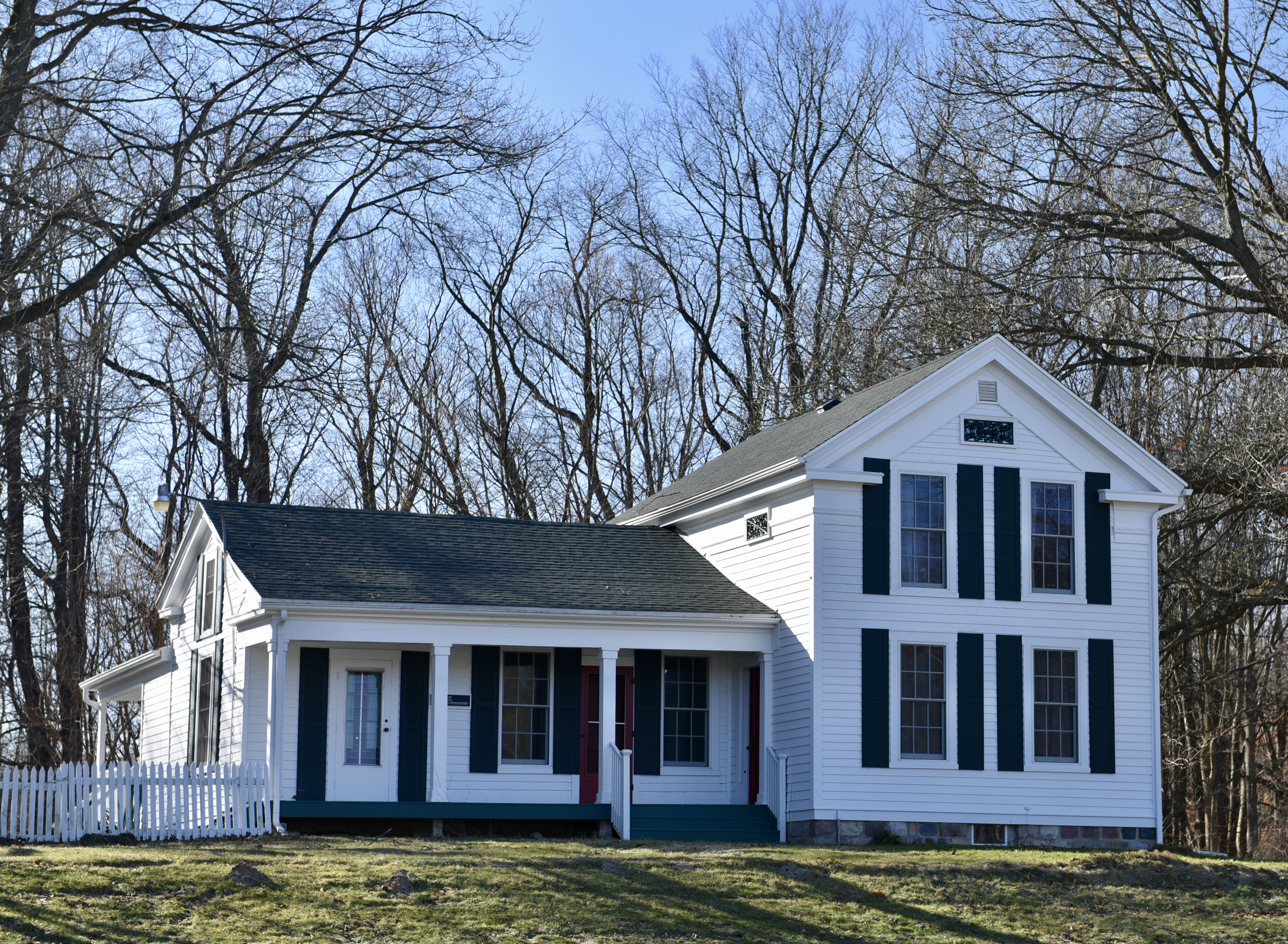

- Location within Michigan Location within the United States
- Interactive map showing the location of Sparks-Anderson House
- Location: 7653 W. Main St., Oshtemo Township, Michigan
- Coordinates: 42°17′43″N 85°41′58″W
- Area: 2.12 acres (0.86 ha)
- Built: c. 1852
- Architectural style: Greek Revival
- NRHP reference No.: 14000125
- Added to NRHP: April 7, 2014

The Sparks-Anderson House is a single-family home located at 7653 West Main Street in Oshtemo Township, Michigan, near Kalamazoo, Michigan. It was listed on the National Register of Historic Places in 2014.

== History ==
Alfred Wilcox purchased the property where this house is located in 1835, selling it the next year to Henry Sparks. Sparks began farming a portion of the property, and in 1842 sold this section to his brother Asa. Asa Sparks likely lived with his brother while starting his own farm, and in about 1852 constructed this farmhouse. Asa Sparks sold the farm to Addison Sill in 1866. It was resold to Silas N. Brownell in 1867, then to George Montgomery in 1876, and finally to Edward Anderson in 1884. Anderson passed the farm to his daughter, Lillian, who deeded roughly about 100 acres (40 ha) to Kalamazoo College in 1982 and sold about 5 acres (2.0 ha) to Warren L. and Nella Langeland in 1992. As of 2014, Kalamazoo College owns the house, with the neighboring former farmland now used as the Lillian Anderson Arboretum.

== Description ==
The Sparks-Anderson House is a wood-framed Greek Revival Upright and Wing house, consisting of a two-story upright and a single-story, side-gable wing. A shed-roofed porch fronts the wing, sheltering three entry doors. A similar single-story wing, constructed in 1977, is attached to the rear of the house. The house is covered with wooden siding, and sits on a stone foundation. The front facade of the upright contains two windows on the first floor and two more on the second. The windows are over six sash units with shutters. A frieze-band window is located above in the gable. Three more frieze-band windows are located on the side facades, and two more large windows are located below on the exposed side. The wing contains two more windows, located between the three entry doors.
