= Townsend Home =

Historic house in Illinois, United States

- U.S. National Register of Historic Places
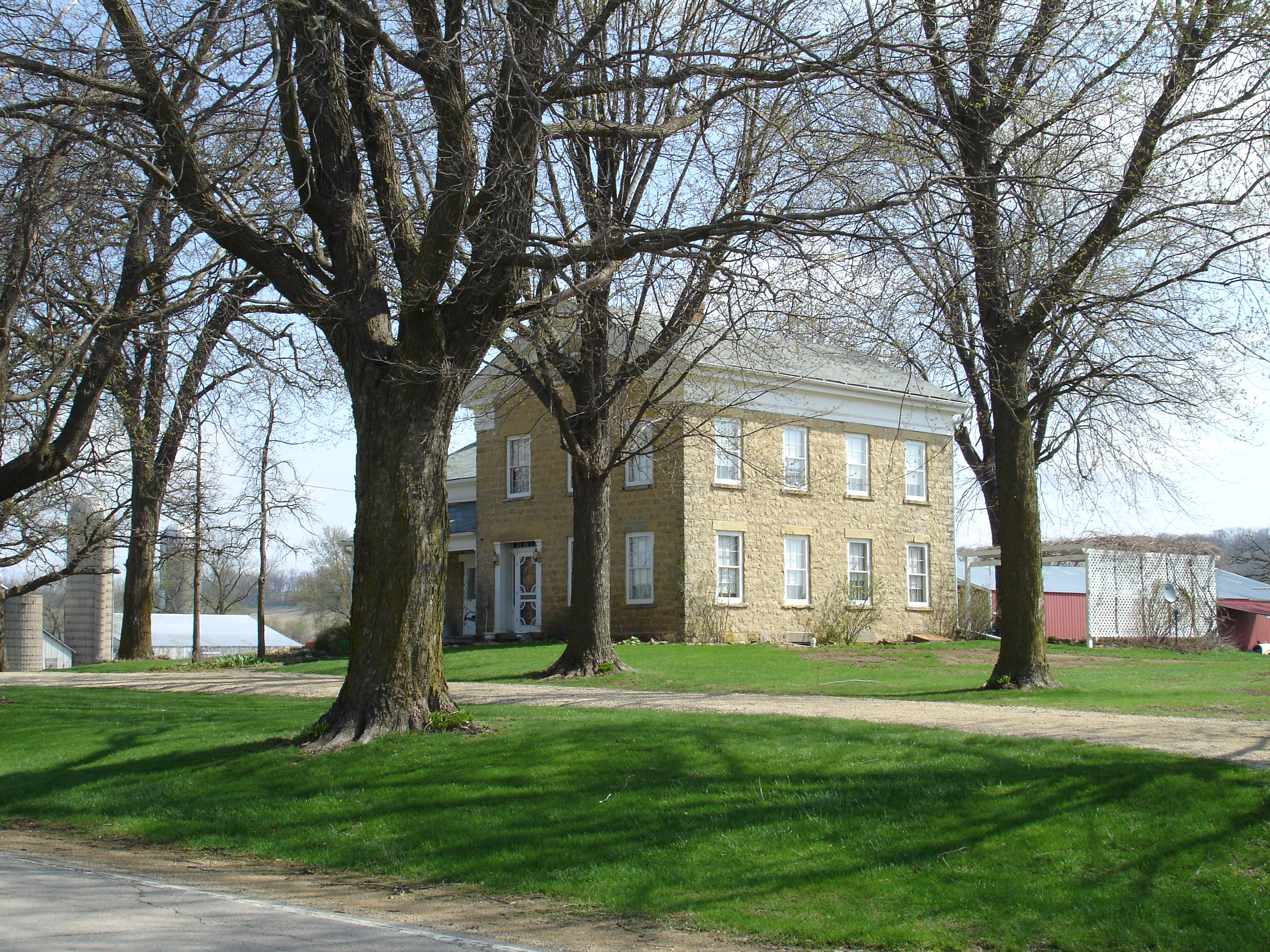

- Location within Illinois Location within the United States
- Location: Jo Daviess County, Illinois
- Nearest city: Stockton, Illinois
- Coordinates: 42°22′26″N 90°3′3″W
- Area: 1 acre (0.40 ha)
- Built: 1856
- Built by: Townsend, George N.
- Architectural style: Upright and Wing, Greek Revival
- NRHP reference No.: 05000111
- Added to NRHP: May 17, 2005

The Townsend Home is a historic house located about 3 miles (4.8 km) from Stockton, Illinois, in Jo Daviess County. It is a fine example of an Upright and Wing style house with Greek Revival detailing, and was completed in 1856. The house was listed on the U.S. National Register of Historic Places in 2005.

== History ==
The Townsend Home was built from 1851 to 1856 on an 800-acre (3.2 km^{2}) farm north of the village of Stockton, Illinois. It lies along Canyon Park Road, which formerly serviced the small, now defunct, community of Millville. The home was built by George Townsend (1806–1893), a New Yorker who came to the Illinois in 1826 with his father, Samuel, and younger brother, Absalom (A.A. Townsend). George Townsend began construction on his home after returning from two years in the California during the Gold Rush.

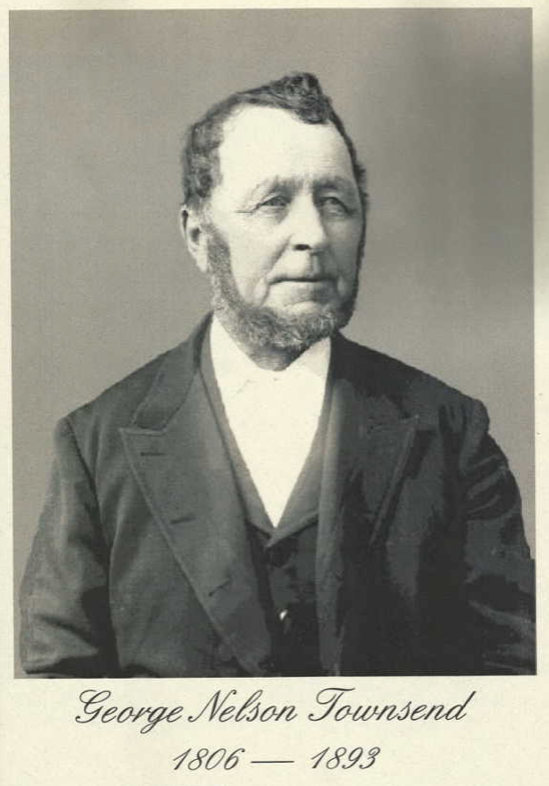

To visit the home, travel 2 miles (3.2 km) west on US 20, then 1 mile (1.6 km) north on Canyon Park Road (County route 10) towards Apple River Canyon State Park.

== Architecture ==
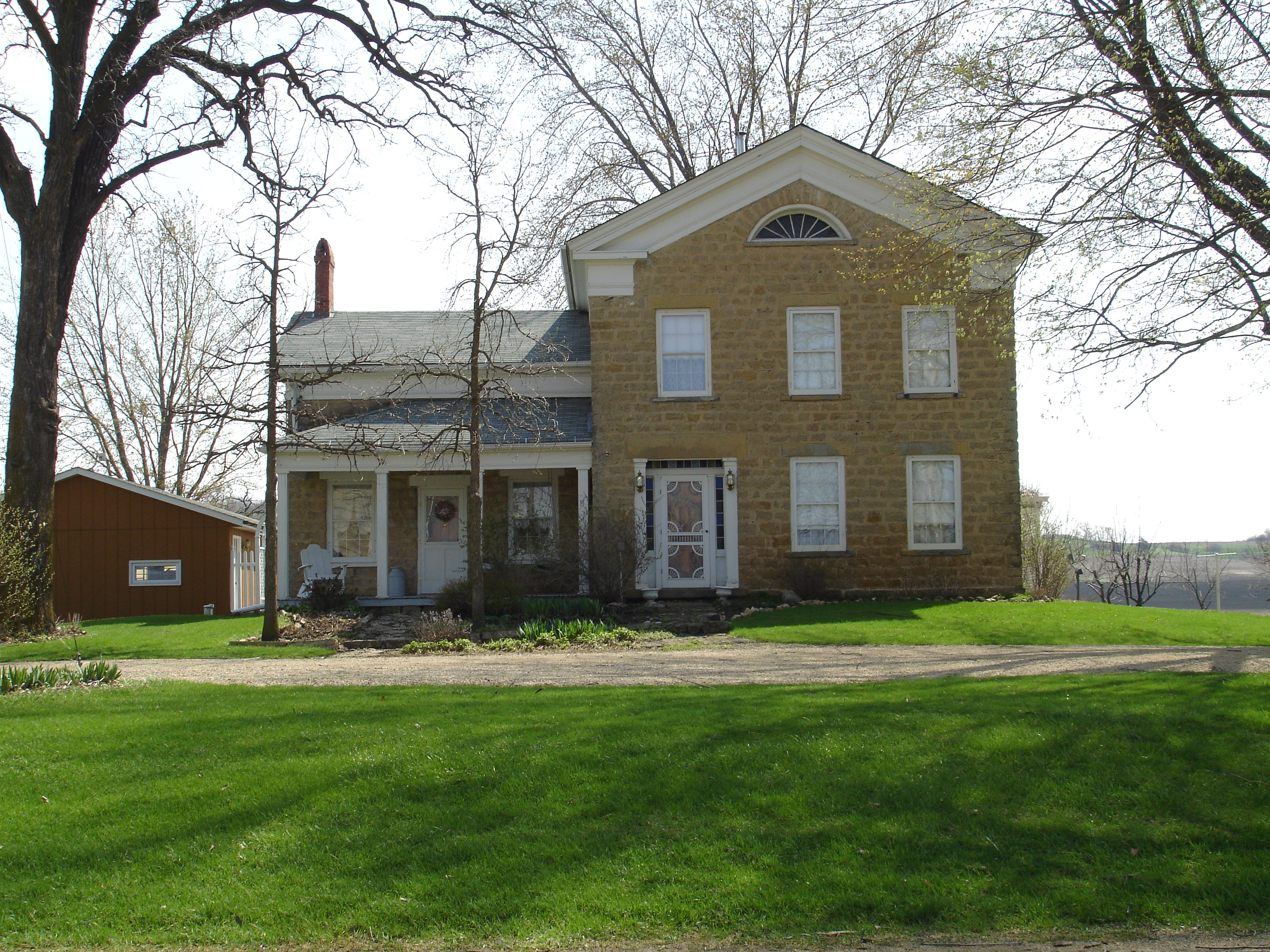
The Townsend Home is a fine example of Upright and Wing style architecture with Greek Revival detailing.

The house is constructed from limestone quarried on the Townsend farm. The designer of the house is unknown, as it is unknown if George Townsend had access to either architectural pattern books or a "master carpenter". It is entirely possible that Townsend himself designed the house. The home follows the tradition of finer Upright and Wing houses of the day, in the manner of those in New England and the Great Lakes region, where the style flourished. The Townsend Home, like many Upright and Wing houses, features characteristics of Greek Revival architecture.

== Historic significance ==
The house is a fine example of the New England Upright and Wing with Greek Revival details. The style came to the area as settlers moved west from New York and New England. The house pre-dates the 1880s village of Stockton, which is 3 miles (4.8 km) away, and the home has a long association with one of the area's earliest families. The home has remained in the Townsend family for at least six generations.

The Townsend Home was added to the U.S. National Register of Historic Places on May 17, 2005.
