= Governor Charles Croswell House =

Historic house in Michigan, United States

- U.S. National Register of Historic Places
- Michigan State Historic Site
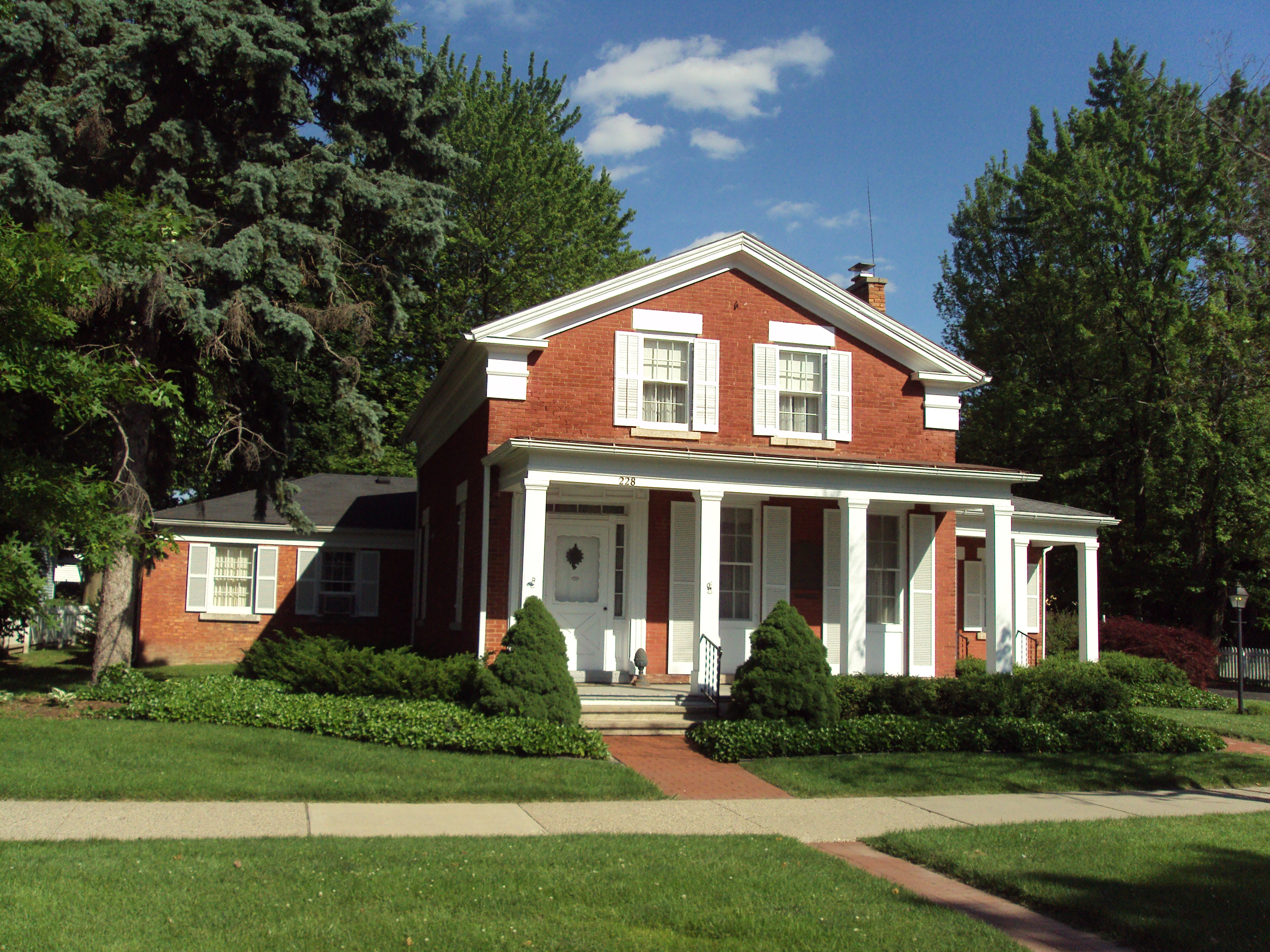

- Location within Michigan Location within the United States
- Interactive map
- Location: 228 North Broad Street, Adrian, Michigan
- Coordinates: 41°53′59″N 84°01′57″W
- Built: 1840s
- Architect: Daniel Hicks
- Architectural style: Greek Revival
- NRHP reference No.: 72000633

Significant dates
- Added to NRHP: March 16, 1972
- Designated MSHS: February 19, 1958

The Governor Charles Croswell House is a building located at 228 North Broad Street in the city of Adrian in Lenawee County, Michigan, United States. It was designated as a Michigan State Historic Site on February 19, 1958 and later listed on the National Register of Historic Places on March 16, 1972. It is located very close to but is not part of the Downtown Adrian Commercial Historic District.

== Description and history ==
Charles Croswell was born in 1825 in New York. He was orphaned at an early age, and went to live with his uncle, carpenter Daniel Hicks. Hicks, with young Croswell, moved from New York to Adrian in 1831. Hicks constructed this house some time in the 1840s. Croswell purchased the house from the Hicks family after Daniel died in 1847. Croswell himself moved into the house in the early 1850s soon after his marriage to Lucy Eddy. Croswell formed a law partnership and started his involvement in local and state politics, serving as deputy county clerk, register of deeds, and taking part in the formation of the Republican Party. He later served two terms in the state legislature, and served as the Governor of Michigan from 1877 to 1881. Lucy Eddy Croswell died in 1868, and Charles Croswell remarried in 1880 to Elizabeth Musgrave. Charles Croswell died in 1886, and Elizabeth lived in the house for two or three years until her own remarriage to lumber baron Thomas Merrill.

In 1925, Croswell's widow, Elizabeth Merrill, restored the house, and donated it to the Lucy Wolcott Barnum Chapter of the Daughters of the American Revolution as a memorial to Charles Croswell. Today, the chapter continues to maintain ownership of the house, which now serves as a museum.

== Description ==
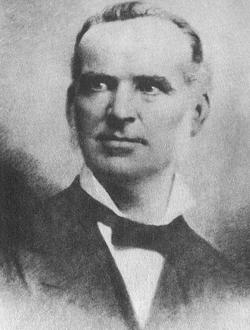
Charles Croswell

The Croswell House is a one-and-a-half-story Greek Revival structure, constructed of red-painted brick with white trim. A single story wing is located to one side, and a single-story extension is located at the rear. Two square-pillared verandas extend across the fronts of the main section and the wing. Each shelters an entryway, the one located in the main section which opens into a hallway, and the one located in the side wing leading into the dining room. The windows are six over six sliding sash with plain trim.
