= Croswell Opera House =

- Adrian Union Hall-Croswell Opera House
- U.S. National Register of Historic Places
- U.S. Historic district – Contributing property
- Michigan State Historic Site
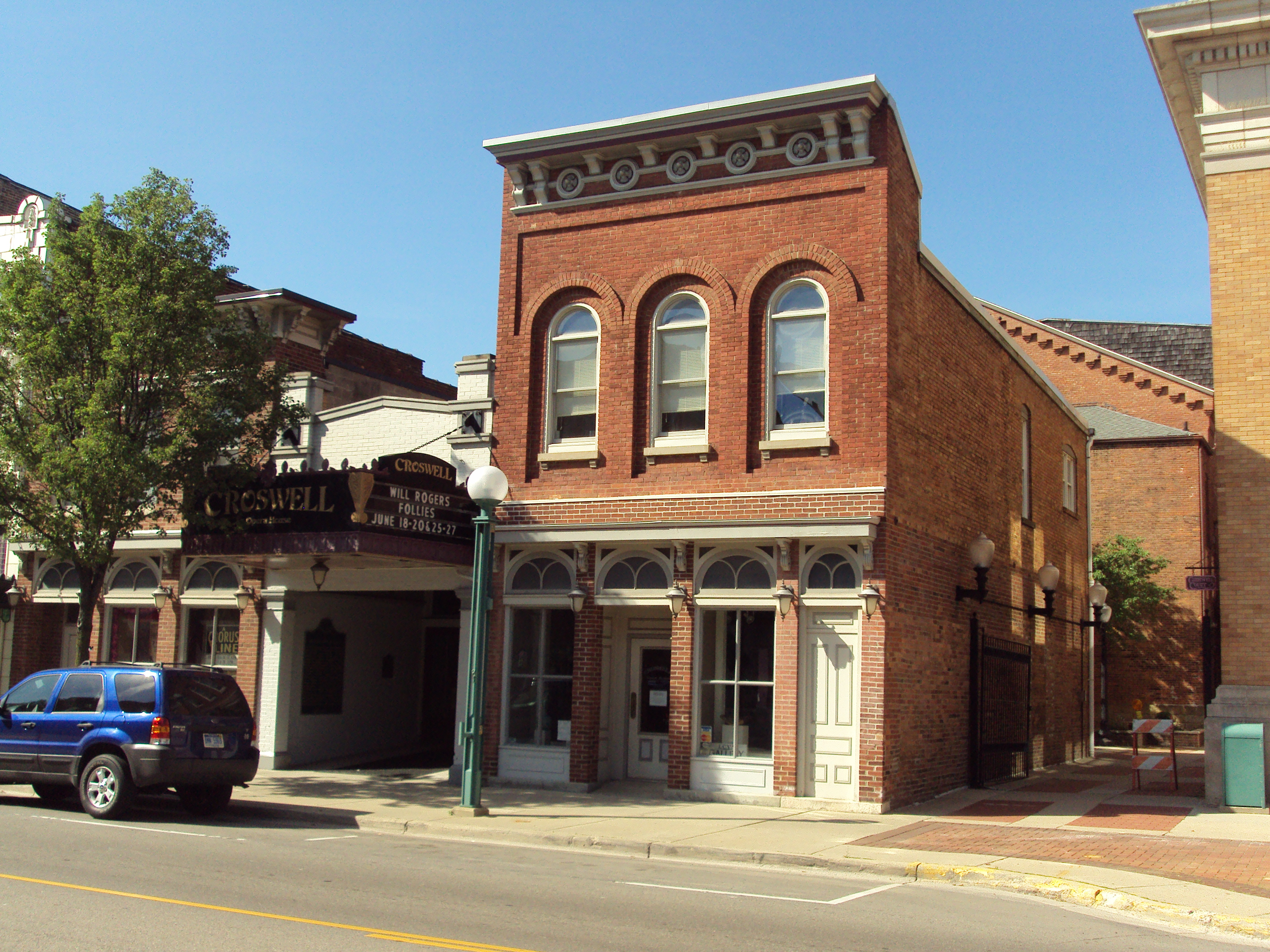

- Location within Michigan Location within the United States
- Interactive map
- Location: 129 East Maumee Street; Adrian, Michigan
- Coordinates: 41°53′55″N 84°02′09″W
- Built: 1866
- Architect: H.N. White (1866); John C. Brompton (1919 and 1921)
- Part of: Downtown Adrian Commercial District
- NRHP reference No.: 85000839

Significant dates
- Added to NRHP: April 18, 1985
- Designated MSHS: March 2, 1976

The Croswell Opera House is a historic theater located at 129 East Maumee Street in Adrian, Michigan. It is recognized as the oldest theater in the state and among the oldest continuously operating theaters in the United States. The theater was designated as a Michigan Historic Site on March 2, 1976 and later added to the National Register of Historic Places as the Adrian Union Hall-Croswell Opera House on April 18, 1985.

== History ==
=== Early history ===
The Croswell Opera House, or Adrian Union Hall as it was originally called, was completed in 1866. It was financed by the Adrian Union Hall Company, whose stockholders included future Michigan governor Charles Croswell. Its first public event, taking place on March 19, was a lecture by temperance advocate John Bartholomew Gough.

The hall served many functions during its early years. It hosted concerts, lectures, festivals, and theatrical performances by both traveling troupes and amateur local groups. Famous speakers who visited the opera house included Susan B. Anthony, Elizabeth Cady Stanton, Frederick Douglass, Thomas Nast, Henry Ward Beecher, and Ralph Waldo Emerson. During the 19th century it hosted performances by Edwin Booth, John Philip Sousa, and Buffalo Bill Cody; the early 20th century saw appearances by Mrs. Patrick Campbell and Maude Adams.

The Croswell has gone by many different names. During its first few years of operation, the local newspaper usually referred to it as "New Hall." Around 1869, it started to be called the Opera House. When Charles Croswell retired as governor in 1881, he returned to Adrian and began buying up shares in the Adrian Union Hall Company, eventually becoming the majority shareholder; he then tasked his son, Charles Croswell Jr., with managing the theater. At this time it became known as Croswell's Opera House. Charles Croswell Jr. gave up the manager's job after his father's death in 1886, but although the possessive was dropped, the name stuck.

A new lobby was added to the original building in 1882. In 1885, the theater's first electric lights were installed — just two of them — and the entire theater was outfitted for electricity in 1895. The lighting apparatus was designed by Harry A. Fee, who is better known for creating Hidden Lake Gardens in nearby Franklin Township. In 1896, to meet the demands of that era's increasingly elaborate theatrical productions, the stage was expanded and the roof above the stage raised.

=== The movie theater years ===
In the early 20th century, the Croswell faced increasing competition from movie theaters. It was purchased in 1919 by Harry Angell and Robert Codd, who undertook two major renovations. The first, in 1919, converted the Croswell into a movie house. A long arcade-style lobby was added to the front of the building, as was a projection booth. Then, in 1921, the original balcony was torn out and replaced and the entire auditorium remodeled. It was during this renovation that the Croswell's interior took on its modern appearance.

The Croswell was leased in 1927 by W.S. Butterfield Theatres, which would continue to operate it for the next 40 years. It was wired for sound in 1929; the first talking picture shown was Weary River.

During World War II, the Croswell raised more than $1 million for the war effort by holding "war bond premieres." The management would bring in a popular new film, and tickets were not for sale; only a newly purchased war bond would entitle a person to admission. Charity toy drives and children's food matinees were also common.

By the 1960s, however, the Croswell faced increasing competition from drive-in theaters and television. A theater with about 1,000 seats — the Croswell's capacity at the time — but only one screen was impractical to operate. In March 1967, the Butterfield chain announced it would not renew its lease, and owner Harry Angell put the building up for sale. The last movie of the Butterfield era, The Sound of Music, closed on September 16, 1967.

=== Revival of live theater ===
With Butterfield's decision to pull out, the Croswell was in danger of being demolished. But Charlie Hickman, the owner of local manufacturing company Brazeway, stepped forward to buy the building, and a new nonprofit organization was chartered to take over its operation. The newly revived Croswell staged its first summer season of live theater in 1968, beginning with a production of Neil Simon's Barefoot in the Park. This was followed by Summer and Smoke, Oliver!, and Once More, With Feeling.

That fall, a new group, the Croswell Players, was formed to continue offering theater during the fall, winter and spring. Eventually, the Croswell's summer and winter theater programs would merge.

In 1970, the tradition of bringing high-profile speakers to Adrian to speak at the Croswell was revived. Speakers in the theater's Town Hall series, which ran from 1970 to 1996, included Gloria Steinem, Helen Thomas, Arianna Huffington, Ralph Nader, Julian Bond, Art Linkletter, Jeane Dixon, Bella Abzug, Kitty Carlisle, Charlton Heston, and "Dear Abby" author Pauline Phillips.

A capital campaign to renovate the theater was announced in May 2015, with changes to include new public spaces, more restrooms, Americans with Disabilities Act improvements, and electrical and other infrastructure upgrades. Construction began in 2016 and the theater reopened in May 2017.

The 2017 season marked the Croswell's 50th summer as a producing theater.

== Architecture ==
The Croswell was originally designed by Horatio Nelson White. In 1865, while the theater was still under construction, a correspondent for the Detroit Free Press visited Adrian and gave this description:

During this season, notwithstanding the high wages, cost of lumber and all building materials, there have been many fine buildings, dwellinghouses and stores erected. The first one particularly attracting attention on entering the city from the depot is “Union Hall,” a large brick structure erected and owned by a joint-stock company at a cost of $35,000. This building is located on the lower end of Maumee street, and fronts directly on it. It is one hundred and fifteen feet and ten inches deep, by sixty-four feet and four inches wide, and built of such a height that the main hall will finish thirty-two feet in the clear. The principal audience room is at some little distance from the street, and is reached through an arched passage-way, on each side of which is an elegant and commodious store. It is eighty feet in depth and sixty-three feet wide, with a gallery on three sides containing three rows of seats, calculated to seat with comfort fifteen hundred people. In the erection of the gallery a new feature is introduced, which, by means of trusses, braces and iron ties, makes it self-supporting, and entirely does away with the necessity of columns or ungainly brackets to support it. There is a large stage, 30x32 feet, which is fitted up for theatrical exhibitions, with scenery, dressing-rooms, &c. In the arrangement of the scenery, some new ideas are carried out, several of the side scenes folding up, while the principal fines, five in number, are suspended from large cylinders overhead, being hoisted and lowered by means of machinery, completely doing away with the squeaking, rattling and confusion generally attendant upon the shifting and sliding of the different pieces, and as a whole scene is raised or lowered at once, the ridiculous gap often seen in the center of an elegant painting is obviated. In the basement are the furnaces for heating the building, a large storeroom capable of containing all the seats of the hall, when it is cleared for the benefit of those tripping the “light fantastic toe,” and a large dining room, which extends the entire length of the building. The ceiling and walls are to be frescoed, and if finished according to design, will present an elegant and tasteful appearance, reflecting much credit on the designers and owners, and the city. In the erection of the structure there is no attempt at the gaudy or gorgeous, everything in and about it is plain, sold [sic.] and substantial. It was designed by H. N. White, of Syracuse, New York, and erected under the supervision of Mr. Smith, a master-builder of this city.

Writing some time later, local historian R.I. Bonner reported that the Croswell was patterned after Wieting Hall in Syracuse.

The physical appearance of the Croswell changed several times over the course of the 19th century. A 14-foot addition was built on the front of the theater in 1882, and the stage roof was raised in 1896 to accommodate more elaborate scenery.

The 1919 and 1921 renovations were directed by architect J.C. Brompton, who also designed the Riviera Theatre in Three Rivers. In 1919, a projection booth was built onto the front of the building and a long arcade-style lobby was added; previously, patrons had to walk down a long alley from Maumee Street and wait outdoors before a show. In 1921, the original horseshoe-shaped balcony was torn out and replaced and the entire interior of the theater was redesigned.

Some of the theater's distinctive features include ornate plaster detailing around the entire auditorium, two tall organ towers on either side of the stage with decorate urns built into them, and large panels on the walls reminiscent of the ones that can be seen in Brompton's RIviera Theatre.

From 1921 until the 1970s, only minor changes were made to the Croswell's interior. In 1976, an addition was built on the back of the theater for a scene shop and offices. Two buildings on either side of the Croswell's front lobby were purchased in 1978 and 1979 and added to the theater, becoming space for rehearsals, offices and an art gallery.

The theater was added to the National Register of Historic Places in 1985.

== Current use ==
The Croswell is a producing theater and operates year-round, staging six to eight full-scale musicals per year, along with straight plays, children's theater, and occasional concerts. It is owned by the Croswell Opera House and Fine Arts Association, a 501(c)(3) nonprofit. Its artistic director since 2009 is Jere Righter.

=== Musical theater ===
The majority of shows produced at the Croswell are musicals. A live orchestra, rather than recorded music, is employed for all of the theater's full-length musicals.

=== Original work ===
In addition to established works, the Croswell has premiered several new plays and musicals, including:

- A Dragon's Tale, a musical by Michael and Betsy Lackey (1985).
- The Legend of Sleepy Hollow, a musical by Don Wilson and Dave Zabriskie (2004).
- Breakfast at Frannie's, a play by Terry Hissong that was named one of Writer's Digest magazine's top plays of the year (2009).
- Obsession, a musical retelling of the Frankenstein story, by Michael and Betsy Lackey (2011).
- The Family Digs, a play by Terry Hissong (2017).

=== Educational programs ===
The Croswell offers a number of educational programs, including summer performance and technical theater camps, an all-area high school musical, paid summer internships for college students, and a variety of children's performances.

== Prominent alumni ==
Theater professionals with a Croswell background include:

- Tobin Ost, scenic designer who was nominated for a Tony Award in 2012 for his work on Newsies.
- Leah Crocetto, opera singer, a 2010 winner of the Metropolitan Opera National Council Auditions and 2009 winner of the José Iturbi International Music Competition.
- Shonn Wiley, a member of the Chicago cast of Jersey Boys and founding member of Under the Streetlamp.
