= Tibbits Opera House =

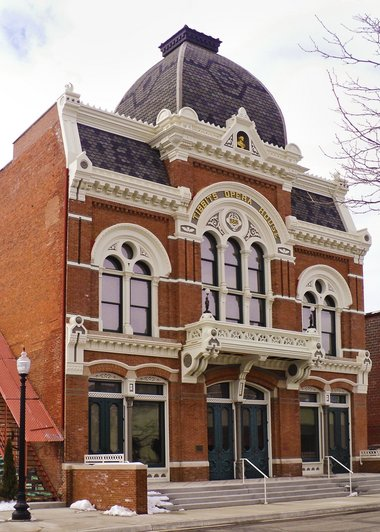
- Tibbits Opera House after restoration

General information
- Architectural style: Second Empire
- Tibbits Opera House
- U.S. National Register of Historic Places
- Michigan State Historic Site
- NRHP reference No.: 100003577

Significant dates
- Added to NRHP: March 25, 2019
- Designated MSHS: December 11, 1970
- Location: 14 S. Hanchett St., Coldwater, MI 49036
- Coordinates: 41.94056°N 85.00411°W
- Completed: 1882

The Tibbits Opera House is a historic performance venue on South Hanchett Street in downtown Coldwater, Michigan. Built in 1882, it is the second-oldest theatre in Michigan. It was listed on the National Register of Historic Places in 2019.

== Building the theatre ==
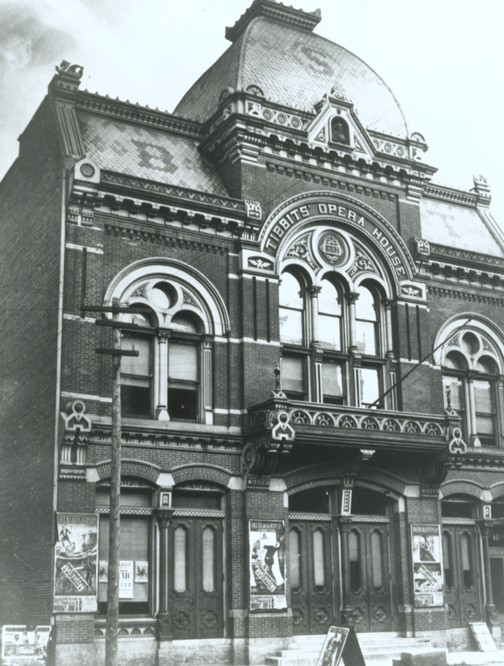
Tibbits Opera House as it looked in 1882 with its original Second Empire architectural facade

Because Coldwater was on the main railway between Detroit and Chicago, news traveled from cities where entertainment and cultural activities were already well established. As an area with plenty of lakes and forested parks, Coldwater also attracted city folk as a resort destination. In 1882, when the theatre was built, Coldwater was a day's trip from either Detroit or Chicago, which resulted in Coldwater's becoming a natural stopping point for visitors and theatre performers traveling the byway. Accordingly, Coldwater residents developed a strong interest in art, culture, and literature.

Barton S. Tibbits, the mayor of Coldwater at the time, accepted a challenge to build an opera house in Coldwater. Art gallery owner H.C. Lewis first proposed that he and Tibbits fund and build an opera house in response to pressure from local newspapers. Each man raised $8,000 for the venture, but Lewis soon backed down. Tibbits forged ahead alone, saying he would "build an opera house if it 'bust' my factory", referring to his cigar business in town.

Tibbits was described by Dennis Vanes, who later owned the opera house, as "the greatest 'pusher' in Michigan" adding that "Mr. Tibbits was a hustler by nature, broad minded and liberal and always ready to help the needy and suffering. He was outspoken in his sentiments and sometimes gave offense where none was intended."

Barton was the son of Allen Tibbits, one of Coldwater's founders. After returning to Coldwater after the Civil War to start his tobacco and cigar business, Tibbits found himself involved in a variety of local projects and buildings "including the skating rink, cart factory, and oil stove industry. He even purchased a number of steamboats to navigate the local lakes." According to Tibbits himself, the opera house was one of the costliest projects of his career. He stated, "I attribute to this enterprise the Opera House my downfall, and the sacrifice of a business, which had I been selfish, would today have made me a millionaire." Indeed, the venture broke Tibbits financially by the end of his life.

Tibbits hired Mortimer Smith, designer of the Detroit Grand Opera House to manifest his vision. The Coldwater Republican, the newspaper of the time, declared "the beautiful theatre will be second to none in the state except in size." The site chosen for the theatre was a plot of land on S. Hanchett street, just off the city's busiest street, Chicago Street, and nearby one of Tibbit's own cigar factories. Coldwater itself was known for its manufacture of cigars and horse breeding. Excavation began Wednesday, November 23, 1881, and the theatre opened almost a year later, September 21, 1882. In the opinion of the Coldwater Republican, Tibbits Opera House was "one of the safest and most stable structures in Southern Michigan."

At the dedication of the theatre, Tibbits gave the following statement:

"Through two motives I was stimulated to make this investment. The first was to erect a monument to my memory that every man, woman and child in Coldwater would appreciate. Second, I would show the unhappy dissatisfied portion of our community that I was not selfish, but ready and willing to do anything in my power to beautify and ornament our city. The old time worn saying that Coldwater is behind the times, and has no respectable place of amusement, tonight passes into oblivion, and with more pleasure than I am able to express I present for your inspection this evening a theatre unequaled in any city the size of Coldwater."

The Coldwater Republican had this to say about Tibbits' efforts:

"For a long time a serious need has been felt in our city for a first-class place of amusement. Although Coldwater is the home of so many wealthy citizens, no one has seemed to possess sufficient courage to embark in so hazardous an undertaking until Mr. B. S. Tibbits, with his accustomed energy and "push" which has accomplished so much in other directions, took the matter in hand and put into execution the hopes and wishes of those who, although acknowledging the need, dared not venture to undertake so great a responsibility, and the result is a beautiful building, an ornament to our city of which we may justly be proud, and an honor to Mr. Tibbits that will endure after the curtain has fallen on the last act in the drama of his life."

Tibbits Opera House held its first performance, a production of Maid of Arran, on September 21, 1882. According to the Coldwater Republican, the performance wasn't as impressive as the opera house. "The song and dance might have been omitted with advantage" sums up the newspaper's account.

== Eras of management ==
=== The Tibbits era ===
The opera houses of the 1800s were the community gathering places for town meetings, local performers, and whatever touring performers passed through. Many opera houses of the era occupied second or third stories of retail buildings. The names of these buildings, "opera houses", though suggestive of a high form of art were named to associate the buildings with the grand style of theatres in Europe. They were not about opera, however.

Performing acts and theatre companies toured, often with a repertoire of several plays, musicians, and novelty acts. As the touring became more organized theatre circuits developed with performers moving from city to city. Shows warmed up on their way to New York City and Broadway or followed a certain pattern across the nation. By the early 20th century, vaudeville theatres were being built across the United States to host these shows.

After an opening costing $25 a seat, Tibbits enjoyed some grand years, hosting a variety of these kinds of diverse productions. All in all, the opera house hosted 111 plays during Tibbits' management, the majority of which was comedy. Dramas also hit the stage such as the Shakespeare favorites Richard III, Romeo and Juliet, and Macbeth. Also popular was the oft performed Uncle Tom's Cabin, which nonetheless drew heavy criticism from local reviewers. The Courier lamented "We knew it would come sooner or later, but have prayed that the calamity might be averted. Our prayers have been in vain, and we will have to submit to the inevitable."

Yet theatre was only one of a large variety of events performed in Tibbits. The stage was the perfect forum for public speeches and lectures. Such lectures covered topics as Edwin Lee Brown's "cruelty to animals", Ida Hulten's "What Shall We Do To Be Saved?" lectures on reformed outlaws, the arctic, and spiritualism. Allen Tibbits, Barton's father, even offered a lecture called "The Origin of the Aborigines of North America." The opera house was a convenient place for various political speeches as well.

The opera house hosted a litany of other events, each in a category of its own. Audiences enjoyed trained dog shows, wrestling matches, Humpty Dumpty Vaudeville and Variety shows consisting of acrobatics, juggling, and farce, the Boston Operatic Minstrels and stereopticon shows. Locals shared their abilities through talent shows and poetry readings. The site was used for community events other than performances such as high school commencements, dancing parties, and masquerade parties. As one of the more seemingly random public events, Tibbits Opera House hosted a reception for a man found not-guilty of arson charges.

Despite such a variety of events hosted in the opera house and the diverse constituency that utilized Tibbits on a regular basis, from the outset Coldwater's gem may have been too big to truly thrive financially in such a small community. In 1885 due to declining attendance and Barton S. Tibbits' own financial difficulties, the opera house faced the very real possibility of being turned into a roller mill. The local community however had become too invested in the theatre to let it go. Carolyn Gillespie has noted that "although a privately owned theatre, the Tibbits functioned more like a public institution." Thus the community, with the help of the local press, launched the first of what would be a long string of unrelenting attempts to save the theatre.

=== The Henning era ===
In 1885, Joseph Henning, a German saloon-keeper, answered the community's call to action and purchased the opera house for $13,000, just over half the original cost of $25,000. While several individuals assumed management duties throughout Henning's tenure, one of the biggest surprises was his teenage daughter Huldah Henning who by 1891 was managing the theatre on her own, signing her father's name since many performers would not accept a female manager. Not only was a female opera house manager unusual, but the Courier claimed that Huldah was "probably the youngest Opera House manager in the country and the only successful female one."

Henning was willing to try some new things to spur business for the opera house. He transformed the front part of the basement into a restaurant and saloon and even built an 85-foot (26 m)-long bowling alley. In 1891 the saloon was turned into a tearoom offering ice cream, cold lunches, and lemonade, which Henning's wife and daughters staffed. Henning also tried to improve the quality of theatrical circuits that came to perform at the opera house, but frequent cancelations and financial difficulties once again threatened to close Tibbits.

A number of solutions were proposed for the theatre. Some suggested that the building be used as a Town Hall and council room. Others proposed a beer garden with variety shows. Thespians who wanted the original purpose of the building to be preserved favored the establishment of a stock company to manage the finances. None of these ideas came to fruition however, and Henning sputtered from one year to the next barely making ends meet.

If the diversity of productions during the Tibbits Era was broad, it was even more so during the Henning years. Theatrical productions included such genres as Irish comedy, combination plays, repertory companies, drama, opera, and operetta. Comedies began to shift toward vaudeville-type performances in which "the performers became more important than the play", with play reviews focusing more on "the actors' songs, dances and acrobatic skills rather than on the play itself" Uncle Tom's Cabin companies continued to tour, trying to outdo each other with the most sensational stage elements. Set designers pushed the limits with special effects creating a rainstorm on stage with actual water and even pushing the safety limit by lighting part of the stage set in "The Streets of New York" on fire. Such efforts were part of a theatrical movement toward "naturalness" and "realism" on stage. In "The Police Patrol", a scene depicted the interior of a police patrol barn with horses in stalls. Once the police alarm sounded, the horses were harnessed and dashed off stage in a matter of seconds. Such was the extent to which performers pushed the element of realism.

The number of lectures hosted at Tibbits picked up during the Henning years in part because for a time, the YMCA sponsored various lecture series. Topics ranged from the problems of the working man hosted by National Assembly of Knights of Labor representative R. F. Trevellick, C. E. Bolton's "Russia and the Romanoffs", a lecture by Robert McIntyre on military life in the Post Civil War South, George Kennan's "Camp Life in Eastern Siberia", topics ranging from love and marriage to prison life, Paul B. DuChailler's prohibitionist lecture, George R. Wendling's discussion of "Saul of Tarsus", lectures on various world geographies, and even one called "Old Ocean, Our Slave and Master", by Prof. Juno B. Demotte. Perhaps the biggest draw came from Robert G. Ingersoll who presented a lecture on Abraham Lincoln, attracting audiences from neighboring counties who flocked to listen to his "matchless oratory and brilliant word-painting" Such events not only made Tibbits a place of entertainment, but one of education as well.

Speaking events were not only meant to inform, but also to persuade. Such was assuredly the purpose of a large number of political speeches and rallies during the Henning years. These events, generally always for Republican causes and candidates, sported rallies with bands, fireworks, and speeches. Two governors even spoke at Tibbits: Gov. Alger in 1885 and Gov. Luce in 1890.

Yet Tibbits was primarily an entertainment center, and the Henning hosted a variety of unconventional shows. Events included boxing matches featuring John L. Sullivan, performances by trained horses and mules, mind-reading presentations, and camel rides. A group called the "Fat Men's Club" entertained the crowd with "singing, dancing and acrobatic performance." The opera house also hosted a company called "The County Fair" which "featured a horse race with three Kentucky thoroughbred horses ridden by professional jockeys over a three-quarter-mile course in full view of the audience." It is safe to assume that such an event was not hosted in the theatre itself. One comedy company awarded a winning raffle ticket holder with a Jersey cow.

Tibbits hosted a number of musical performances during the Henning Era as well. Such shows included "The Royal Spanish Troubadours", the "Boston Symphony Orchestral Club", the "Michigan University Glee and Banjo Club", the "Swedish National Octet" which made two appearances, and the "Harvard Quartette." Minstrel groups also took to the stage, although these groups had more of a circus feel to them rather than being strictly musical performances. Such shows included bike acts, juggling, club-swinging, and cornet playing. One show in particular, "Duncan Clark's Lady Minstrels and New Arabian Nights" reportedly pushed the limits of Coldwater's conservative social mores with one reviewer commenting, "…Seated upon the stage were eight females, scantily dressed.…There was nothing, save perhaps a highland fling, that merited any commendation. The singing was insipid, the marching by the amazons horribly executed, a little better than a flock of sheep…It is hoped this city will be spared the infliction of another like exhibition." Another reviewer called it "the vilest show that ever appeared in Coldwater", labeling the women as "coarse brazen things."

Additional events included art exhibits, high school commencement exercises and reunions, a marionette show, and even a Sanitary Convention.

=== The Jackson era ===
Eventually, Joseph Henning's financial struggles caught up to him, and he handed over the management of the theatre to John T. Jackson in 1894, who married Joseph's daughter, Huldah Henning. Together they managed the theatre with Henning ultimately handing over ownership of the theatre to John and Huldah in 1904. They owned and operated the theatre until its sale to Dennis Vanes in 1920. In later years Huldah's younger sister Josephine Henning Beyer had this to say about the Jackson management: "Under the superb management of John T. Jackson, Coldwater received the joy of witnessing the very best of dramas, operas, bands and orchestras, and various other amusements in a then modern theatre." With knowledge and experience that previous managers lacked, Jackson, the "first 'theatrical man' to manage the Tibbits", was able to make the opera house financially successful for the first time and at a time when other opera houses were on the wane. Not only was he more successful at booking groups for performance, but in the 1890s, he also made improvements to the theatre to give it every modern advantage. Jackson redesigned scenery mechanisms, moved girders to add wing space, made ticket sales more efficient, installed electric fans for the comfort of the audience, added a sprinkler system and steel fire curtain, and updated the available electric current. He may be responsible for the theatre's longevity, since many other theatres were destroyed by fire.

Based on the demands of performance companies who insisted on higher ticket prices to justify a trip to Coldwater, Jackson found it necessary to raise ticket prices for the first time. This was met with stiff opposition and criticism by reviewers from the two major local newspapers, The Courier and The Republican. Although these newspapers were unable to deny Jackson's successful management of the theatre, the rift between the press and Tibbits increasingly began to widen. It was a third upstart newspaper, The Daily Reporter, which defended Jackson's management. The only paper that survived was the one that tied its loyalty to the historic opera house.

Tibbits Opera House continued to host many of the same types of programming as under previous eras of management, while also bringing new variety to the stage as well. Theatre genres included melodramas, pastoral plays, Irish dramas, combination plays, farce, and scenic attractions, with Charles Hoyt and Clyde Fitch being the most popular playwrights. The farces tended to focus more on comic specialties rather than a developed plot. Regarding one such farce, At the French Ball, a reviewer quipped, "…The play is one of those kind of creations that one enjoys when he has had a good dinner and has nothing else to do but to gaze and laugh, and feel as Frenchy as possible." Another feature of comedy in this era is that it increasingly included elements of vaudeville with it becoming increasingly "difficult to distinguish between pure comedy and variety entertainments." Famous melodramas during the period included The Convict's Daughter and Was She to Blame. The number of Uncle Tom's Cabin companies, whose shows had apparently evolved into farce and comedy from the original serious tenor of the story, declined during this period. But taking the place of Uncle Tom's Cabin was the oft repeated Faust, an opera which stressed scenery and electrical effects. The comic opera Wang featured one of the more absurd stunts performed on the Tibbits stage with a beer-drinking elephant that downed a four-gallon glass of brew. All in all, 376 plays were performed on the Tibbits stage in the decade from 1894 to 1904 alone, a large increase from the Barton S. Tibbits era.

Musical performances continued to be popular as well with such groups as the "Chicago Marine Band", "the Mexican Troubadours", the "Boston Ladies Symphony Orchestra", and the very famous "Sousa Band" featuring John Philip Sousa, which performed twice in 1897 and in 1900. One musician, whose performance was inconvenienced by the failed shipment of his luggage and noisy child in the audience stormed off the stage. The Weekly Courier noted, "He deliberately put his fiddle under his arm and left the stage like a crusty old curmudgeon." 1898 even featured an open-air concert from the Tibbits balcony, which was part of the original Tibbits façade.

Speeches and lectures continued to be a regular offering on the Tibbits stage. These included such lectures as Wallace Bruce's "Philosophy of Wit and Humor", Charles Hampton's "Hard Times, Their Cause and Cure", and Robert G. Ingersoll's "Liberty of Man, Woman and Child." Capturing the rhetorical might of such lectures, the Weekly Courier described Judge Yaple's lecture "Personality", with the following words: "A flowing crystal of words, here and there sharply broken into prisms of color, through which one caught a glimpse of crimson sunsets, the majesty of the mountains, the waving flowers of the meadow, the sweetness of the lilies of the valley, the stillness and solemnity of the leafy woods, the songs of birds, the celestial harmony of the starry heavens and the roar and thunder of a thousand Niagaras." A number of political speeches were offered as well by the likes of Gov. Rich, Senator J. C. Burrows, Gov. Shaw of Iowa, and Adeli Stevenson, a vice presidential nominee.

Variety and Vaudeville continued to increase in popularity during the Jackson years with repeat performances by Humpty Dumpty companies, pantomime, and even magic shows. Shows also took an eerie turn with Anna Eva Fay's spiritualism performance, Mysterious Oneida's séance, and Hermann the Great's show on occult phenomena.

As technology improved, so also did the kinds of innovative performances Tibbits was able to put on stage. Such obscure technologies as cinematoscopes and luminere cinematographs offered the promise of displaying moving pictures. Kleine's Lumiere Cinematograph promised families the chance to see their sons in the Spanish–American War march toward the camera. Thomas Edison's Magniscope never reached Coldwater because it exploded en route, but his Animotoscope did. Eventually the Lyman H. Howe Company offered genuine moving pictures with its Vivograph Graphophone, which depicted a train ride through the Rocy Mountain's Frazer River Canyon. While such technologies had much to be desired in terms of quality, they were nonetheless important steps in the march toward the modern cinema.

Although he had fallen on financial hard times, Barton S. Tibbits lived long enough to see his dream survive and prosper. It is only fitting that upon his death, his memorial service would be held on the very stage that he erected at his own sacrifice for the benefit of Coldwater and the wider community's citizens. His funeral was held August 27, 1889. The opera house also offered memorial services for President McKinley.

=== The Cinema era ===
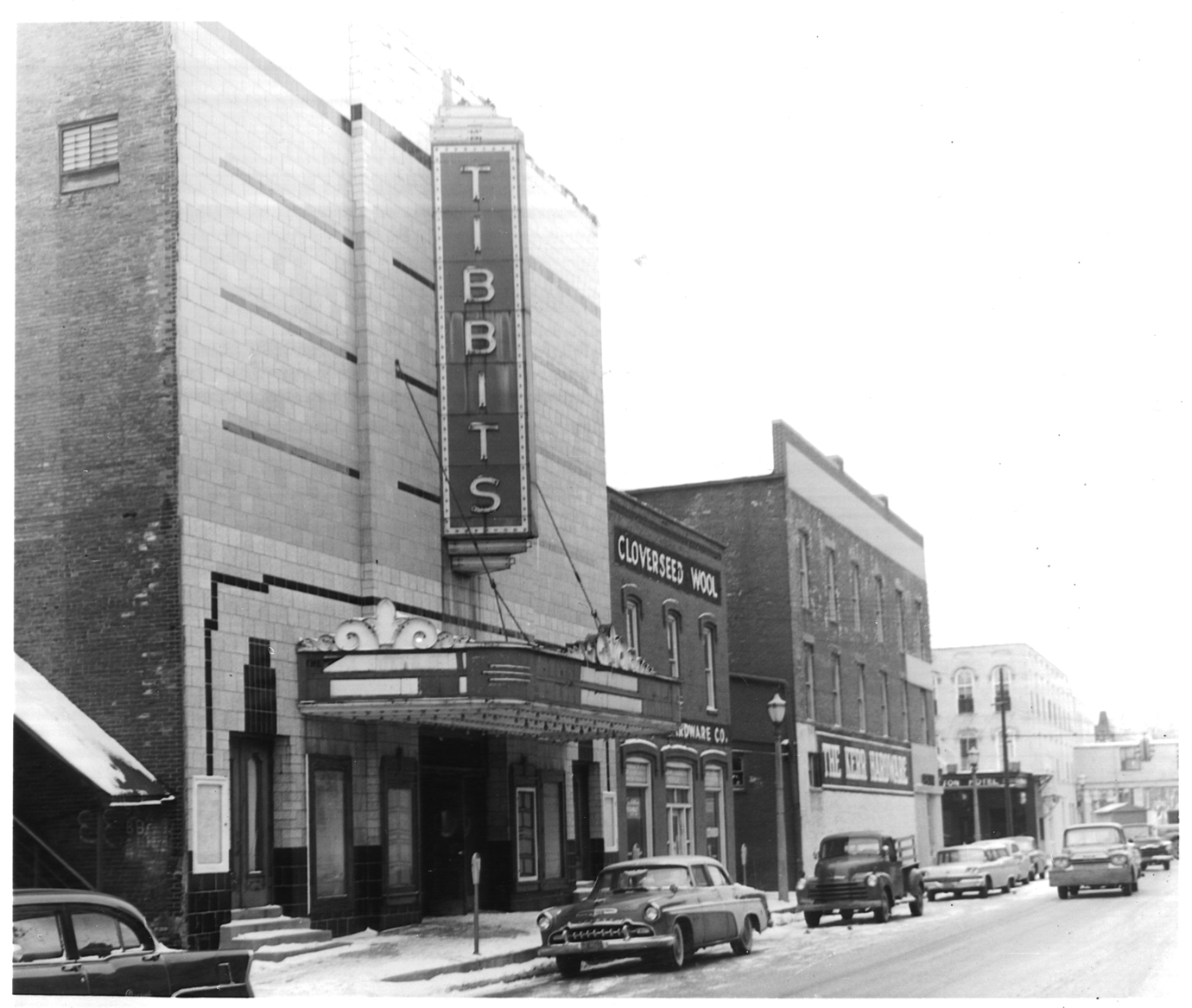
Tibbits Opera House during the cinema era. The original facade was bricked over to give the theatre a contemporary feel.

In 1919 Dennis and Estella Vanes purchased Tibbits and brought in movies. William J. Schulte bought the opera house in 1934 and physically "modernized" it into a movie theater.

=== The Modern Era ===
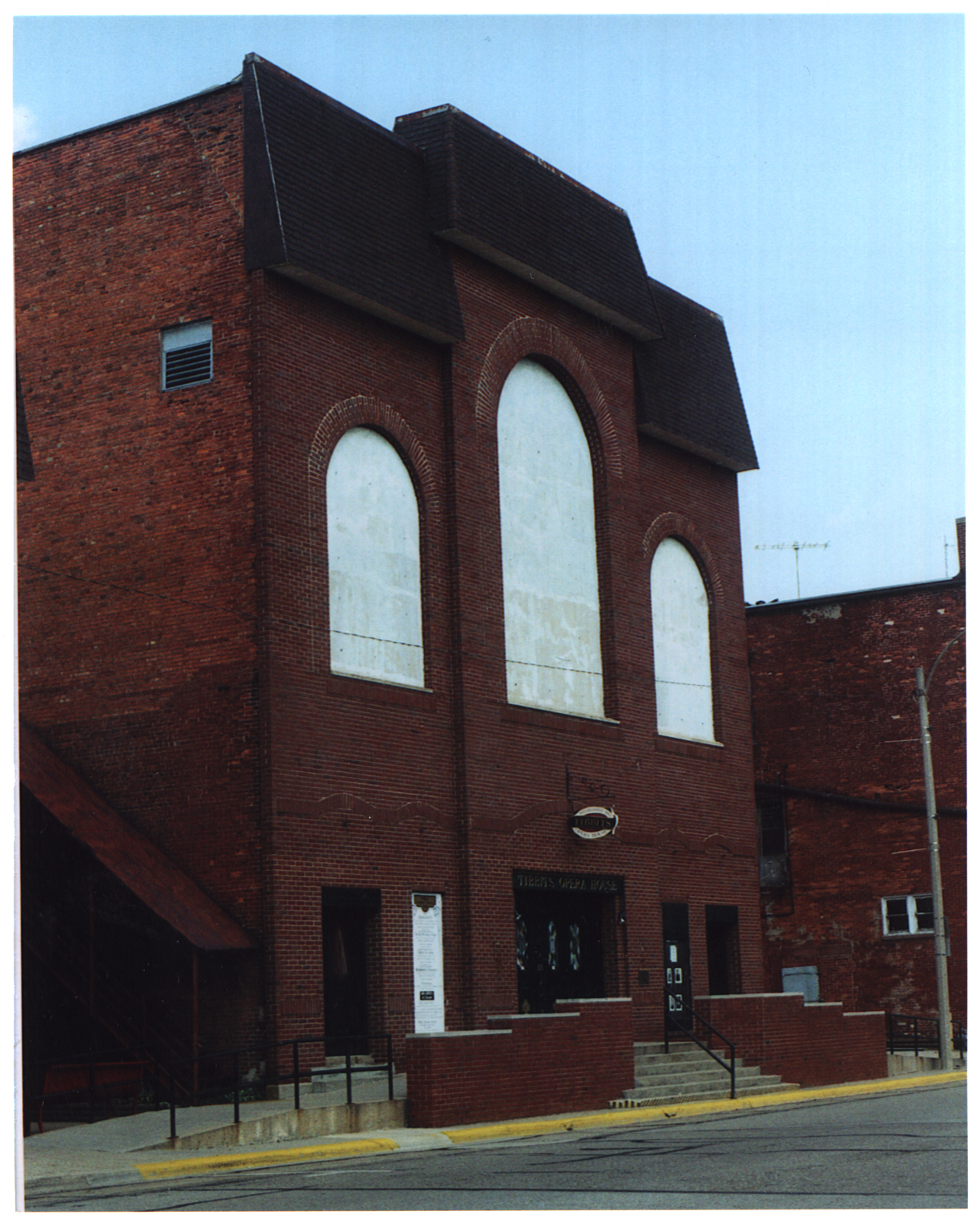
The 1960s facade before any restoration efforts began

Today, Tibbits' youth and educational programming provides diverse opportunities for children and teens to participate in the arts. The programming includes productions in which the cast is made up of area children, touring arts presentations and Popcorn Theatre, and shows presented for children featuring members of Tibbits Summer Theatre's professional summer stock company.

Additionally, concerts offer a variety of touring performers. The Tibbits Art Gallery on the lower level, exhibits the work of many fine professional artists, local art groups and children as well as provides a yearly juried show for high school students. The Tibbits also holds an annual benefit auction that is as much a social event for the area as it is a fund-raiser. In addition to the programs sponsored by the Tibbits Opera Foundation, the theatre is used extensively by community groups presenting plays, musicals, concerts, dance programs, travelogues, pageants, and variety shows.

During the rest of the year Tibbits presents an entertainment series featuring a variety of artists and styles. Recent performers have included Jeff Daniels, Melissa Manchester, and John Corbett. The effort is to bring quality arts performances and "name" entertainment to Branch County's rural community.

Funding for the Tibbits Opera House comes primarily from memberships in the Tibbits Opera Foundation which are open to individual and corporate supporters.

== Tibbits Summer Theatre ==
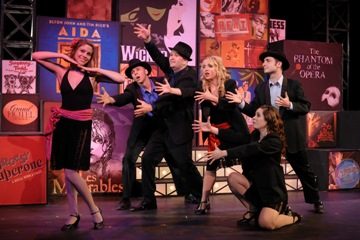
The cast on stage during On Broadway: A Modern Songbook in June 2010.

Tibbits has long sought to present the best possible theatre for Branch County and the surrounding area. Since 1966, Tibbits Summer Theatre (TST) has brought professional theatre by stock company to Southwest Michigan and the tri-state area. USA Today has even named Tibbits one of "10 great places to see the lights way off Broadway."

Yet the first two years of summer stock at the newly restored Tibbits, beginning in 1964, were produced by the American Theatre Festival. Mostly made up of theatre professionals from Indiana, the group presented a large season, with a new show opening every week. The comedy "The Solid Gold Cadillac" was the opening production, followed by nine other plays and one musical.

By 1966, Tibbits executive director Larry Carrico decided that Tibbits itself would produce the season. Musicals became the stock-in-trade and are still the staple of the Tibbits season. While Tibbits has produced the biggest names such as "Show Boat", "South Pacific", and "Fiddler on the Roof", it has also been instrumental in introducing audiences to lesser-known gems such as "Lucky Stiff", "Hi-Hat Hattie", "Baby" and "I Love You, You're Perfect, Now Change."

== Architecture ==
=== Original construction ===
Preserved in the edition of September 19, 1882, of the Coldwater Republican newspaper is a detailed account of the building's physical description. From surviving photos and valuable accounts like these, we can re-imagine the experience of the original theatre patron. When Tibbits Opera House first opened, such a patron would have found the theatre to be nothing less than an architectural masterpiece.

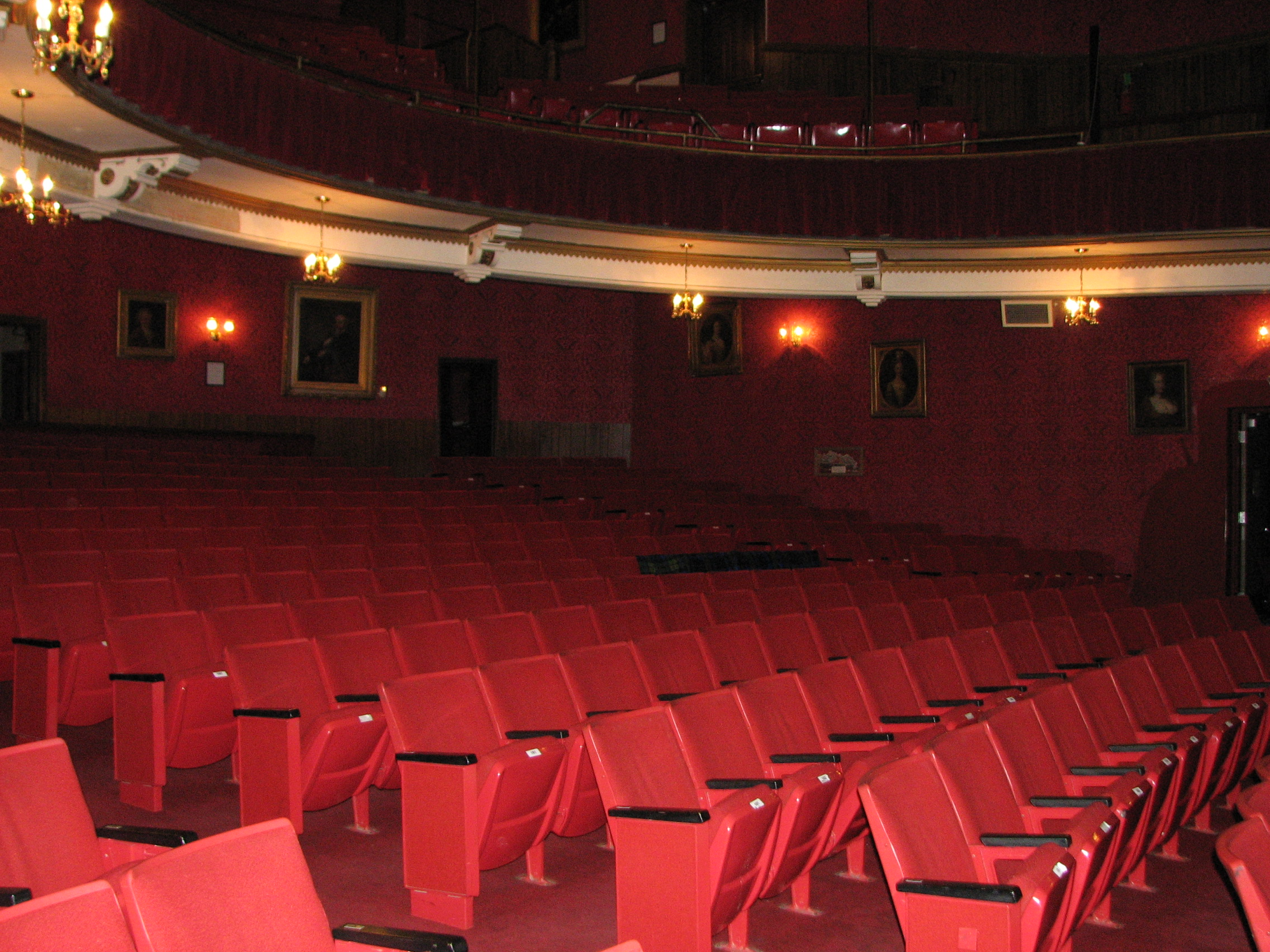
A modern-day view of the inside of the theatre house

A patron's first experience of the theatre would have been a view of the building's façade. With its French "Second Empire" architectural design, the building was adorned with a 24-foot (7.3 m)-tall, slate-covered cupola with a flag staff mounted with a golden eagle statue. The tip of the dome itself towered 76 feet (23 m) above the pavement below. At the base of the cupola, one could behold an elegant bronze bust of Shakespeare, and below this still, inscribed in an arch above the front window was "Tibbits Opera-House, 1882", in gold leaf. The face itself consisted of iron work, red and black brick, and cut stone "united in excellent taste." Three large windows allowed the glow of the sun to fill the theatre lobby, and below the middle window was an iron balcony furnished with glass globe lanterns.

As a patron entered the front doors, he would have found himself in a lobby with two stairwells leading up to the balcony, a manager's office, and a smoking room. Upon stepping through the terracotta leather covered and gold trimmed wooden doors into the auditorium, a patron would have been softly bathed in the shimmering glow of 94 gas lights. These lights, were crafted of polished brass and fitted with etched glass globes. The stage itself was equipped with 174 gas lights. All the lights in the entire theatre were controlled from the stage by means of a pipe system, allowing the stage manager to ignite or extinguish any or all of these brilliant lights in an instant. Beneath a dome resplendent with painted cherubs, a large chandelier, known as an "Opal glass reflector", scattered sparkles of reflected light over all. Elegant red Brussels' carpet softened patrons' steps, and grand opera chairs, upholstered in dark Cardinal plush awaited to seat them. These chairs were engraved with the monogram, B.S.T., Barton Tibbits' initials, and many of these chairs offered foot rests and hat and umbrella racks. Amazingly the auditorium originally held 1,000 seats for patrons. The seating area was divided into the parquet and the parquet circle – two separate areas on the floor in front of the orchestra pit. The walls of the auditorium, colored in cameo tints and dashes of cardinal, green, and gold color in "conventional figures" produced "a warm, sunny effect and [gave] the auditorium a bright and airy appearance which is very pleasing." Dominating the scene was a grandly ornate 34-foot (10 m)-wide by 53-foot (16 m)-long proscenium stage with elegant opera boxes situated within the massive tin and plaster arch.

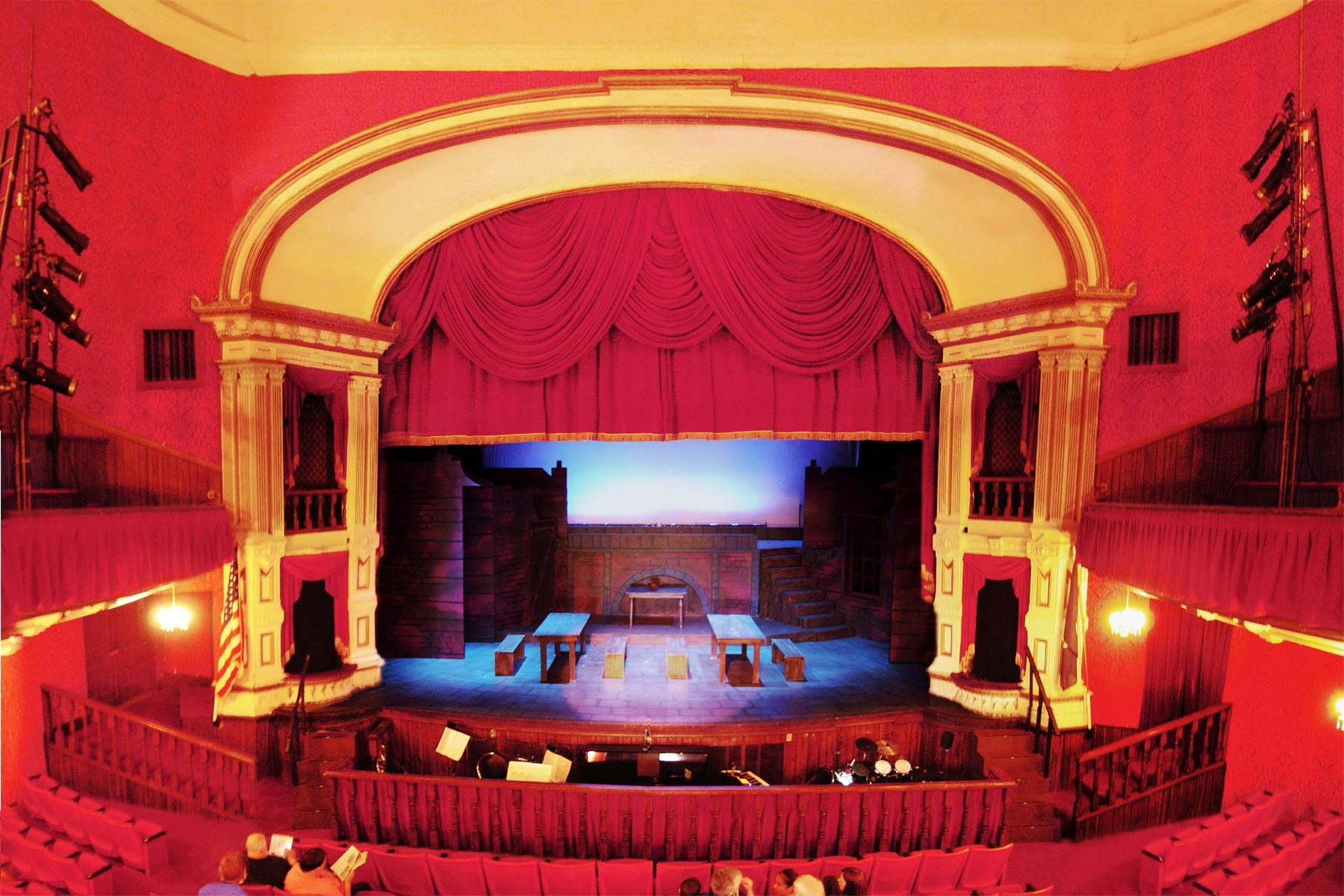
A modern-day view of the Tibbits stage and proscenium arch

The stage itself had all the latest technological features. Scenery and curtains were shifted and moved via the rigging loft, and the stage itself included a "paint-bridge and movable frame, five sets of grooves, trapdoors, and every modern convenience for producing all kinds of scenic effects." Additionally, speaking tubes and bell signals connected the stage manager with the box office, orchestra, and scene and trap shifters. The stage's collection of scenic backdrops was exhaustive and of the highest quality, and was a third larger than the Kalamazoo Opera House.

The boxes were draped with cardinal silk plush curtains, lined with gold, and trimmed with lace. In the center of the proscenium arch, one beheld a portrait of William Shakespeare and above this portrait against a light-blue background was "a group of cherubs, gracefully posed, representing music and the drama." Surrounding the main chandelier in the auditorium were more "cunning little cherubs" trailing garlands of flowers. In the words of the Coldwater Republican, "The delicate coloring of the background brings out the figures in strong relief so one may almost imagine them floating in space and inhale the odor of their fragrant burden." The cove around the auditorium also was decorated with "vases of flowers, bouquets and conventional vines and figures." L. B. Chevelier, who painted many of the stage's backdrops, was the artistic genius behind such creations.

Regarding the workmanship of the theatre, Carolyn Gillespie has observed that "Tibbits was easily as elegant as the Second Olympic Theatre which was completed in St. Louis that same year." Elegance was paired with superb acoustics in the rendering of the stage and auditorium, and all in all, ironically the best visual description is perhaps given by the Republican: "It is impossible to give a description of the decorations which will convey an adequate idea of their beauty. They must be seen in order to be appreciated." Unfortunately for the modern patron, such an opportunity has long since died.

=== The campaign for restoration ===
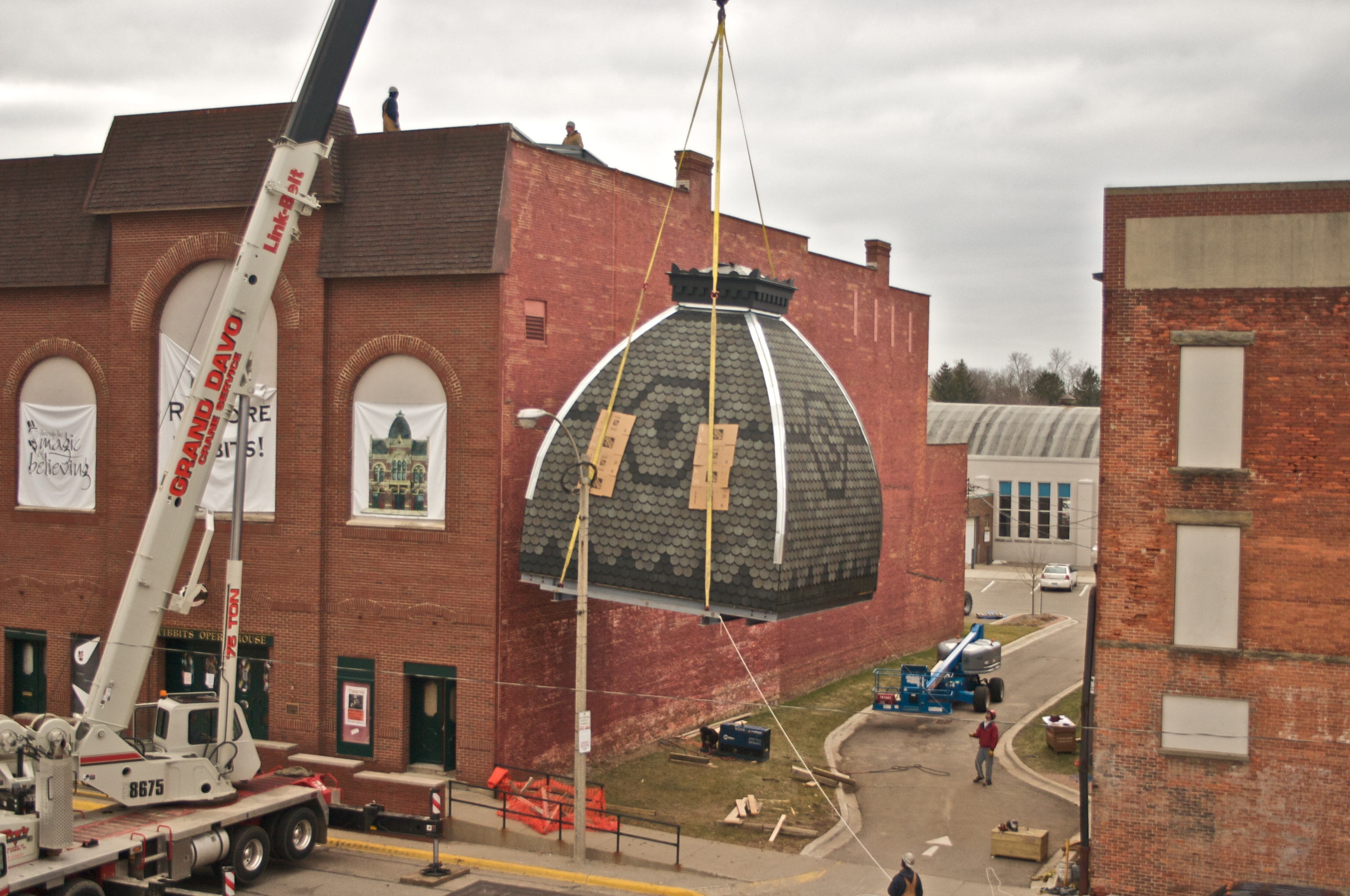
A key phase of restoration is completed with the hoisting of the new cupola on top of the theatre.

After years of serving Branch County, toward the end of the Cinema Era the hall was slated for destruction. Tibbits was boarded up and scheduled to be razed by the end of the 1950s. Local supporters rallied support and raised funds to save the theatre. Many theatres were not as fortunate and were torn down in the name of urban renewal, but Tibbits Opera House was saved, thanks to concerned citizens who restored the interior to Victorian style. The Tibbits Opera Foundation and Arts Council was founded in 1963 and now operates the facility year-round as a community center for the arts.

With the turn of the century, the Tibbits Opera Foundation mobilized to mount yet another restoration campaign with fundraising and design development beginning in 2002. While the 1960s renovation was intended to save the theatre, the latest renovation effort is intended to return Tibbits to its original grandeur. In the spring of 2006, the addition of a handicap accessible entrance and elevator onto the side of the theatre to make the theatre more accessible to all customers and patrons was completed. In February 2009, another phase of the restoration project was completed with the hoisting of the newly constructed cupola onto the theatre. With the raising of sufficient funds, Phase III, which is the restoration of the 1960s facade to the original French "Second Empire" architectural design, began in 2011 and was completed in 2013.

== See also ==
- National Register of Historic Places listings in Branch County, Michigan
