= Prairie smoke =

Prairie smoke is a common name for several plants and may refer to:

- Geum triflorum (also called Three-Flowered Avens, Old Man's Whiskers), a spring perennial prairie wild flower
- Pulsatilla nuttalliana (also called Anemone patens), in the buttercup family Ranunculaceae
