= Downtown Adrian Commercial Historic District =

Historic district in Michigan, United States

- Downtown Adrian; Commercial Historic District
- U.S. National Register of Historic Places
- U.S. Historic district
- Michigan State Historic Site
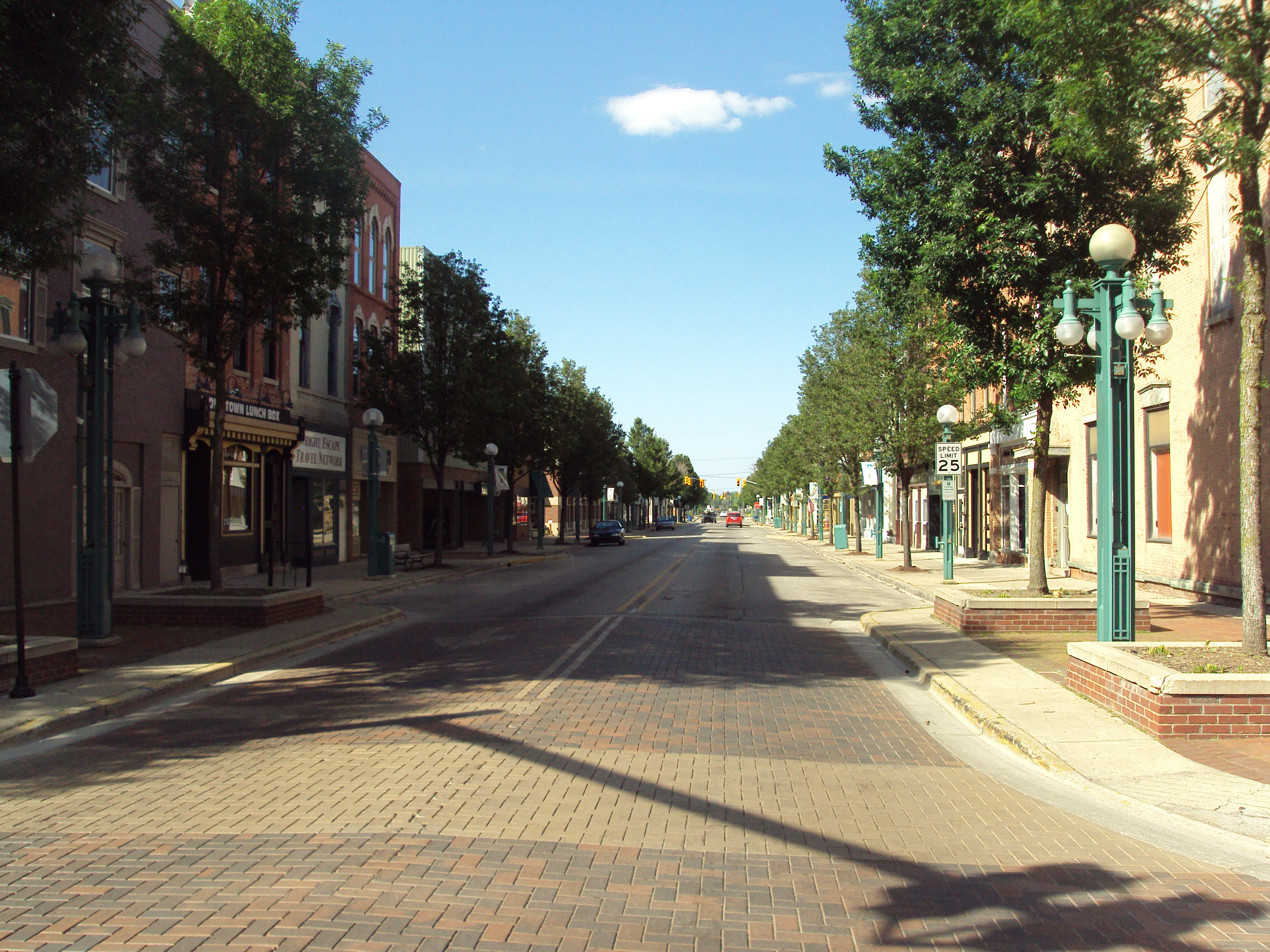
- Looking north along Main Street (M-52)

- Location within Michigan Location within the United States
- Interactive map
- Location: Adrian, Michigan
- Coordinates: 41°53′55″N 84°02′12″W
- Architectural style: Federal, Greek Revival, and Late Victorian
- NRHP reference No.: 86000803
- Added to NRHP: April 17, 1986

The Downtown Adrian Commercial Historic District is a historic district comprising the downtown area of Adrian, Michigan. It was designated as a Michigan Historic Site and added to the National Register of Historic Places on April 17, 1986. The district is roughly bounded on the north by Toledo Street, on the east by North Broad Street, on the south by East Church Street, and on the west by North Winter Street (M-52), West Maumee Street, and the River Raisin. Most of the district is enclosed by the US-223 Business Route, although the two are not conterminous.

== History ==
Adrian was first settled in 1826 by Addison J. Comstock, building a group of cabins at this site. Comstock built a sawmill, and in 1828 platted the first section of the city, nearly all of which in included in the current historic district. Both residences and commercial buildings were constructed on the area, with the first commercial enterprise, Dr. E. Conant Winter's dry goods store, opening in 1829. As Adrian grew, the earliest frame buildings were displaced by the growing commercial district. In 1838, Adrian became the county seat, creating a legal and financial sector within the district. A number of banks opened their doors in the mid 19th century.

By the latter part of the century, development in the downtown district reached its peak. A new courthouse was constructed in 1884 (just outside the district), and Adrian was the commercial supply center for the surrounding agricultural area. By 1900, the growth of the central business district had slowed, leaving a district that has changed little in the years since. Although many of the storefronts have been altered, some buildings demolished, and a few new buildings added, downtown Adrian is a remarkably intact representation of what the area looked like over a century ago.

== Description ==
The Downtown Adrian Commercial Historic District contains 102 structures, of which 84 contribute to the historical character of the district. The buildings within the district are a mix of Federal, Greek Revival, and Late Victorian architecture. The oldest buildings within the district today date back to 1865; the majority were built between 1865–1920. Most of the buildings are two- and three-story commercial structures, but some churches, government buildings, and other social structures (such as the Adrian Union Hall-Croswell Opera House and Clark Memorial Hall, both individually listed on the National Register of Historic Places) are included.

The majority of the buildings in the district are Italianate in style, with the finest example being the highly detailed Clark Memorial Hall, with its eclectic limestone and metal facade. Older architectural styles are also represented, such as the three-story brick Federal style Lathrop Block at 128 E. Maumee. Greek Revival is also represented, including the large three-story masonry Greek Revival Underwood Block at 101 E. Maumee and two early churches: the 1837 First Baptist Church at 119 N. Broad, and the 1842 First United Presbyterian Church. A few Revival buildings exist in the district, and some of the latest additions include the 1905 YMCA building at 146-150 S. Main, which is a hybrid composition with Richardsonian and Classical elements; the 1925 Tudor Adrian Armory at 230 W. Maumee; and the 1924 Neoclassical Masonic Temple at 160 E. Maumee.
