= Southern Michigan Railroad Society =

Railway museum in Clinton, Michigan

Overview
- Headquarters: Clinton, Lenawee County, Michigan
- Locale: Lenawee County, Michigan, USA
- Dates of operation: 1982–

Technical
- Track gauge: 4 ft 8 1/2 in (1,435 mm) standard gauge

Other
- Website: southernmichiganrailroad.com

The Southern Michigan Railroad Society is a railway museum in Clinton, Michigan, United States. It has preserved 13.5 miles (21.7 km) of track and a variety of railroad equipment including the only GMDH-3 locomotive ever built and the last GE 44 tonner. Trains are operated on a seasonal schedule.

== History ==
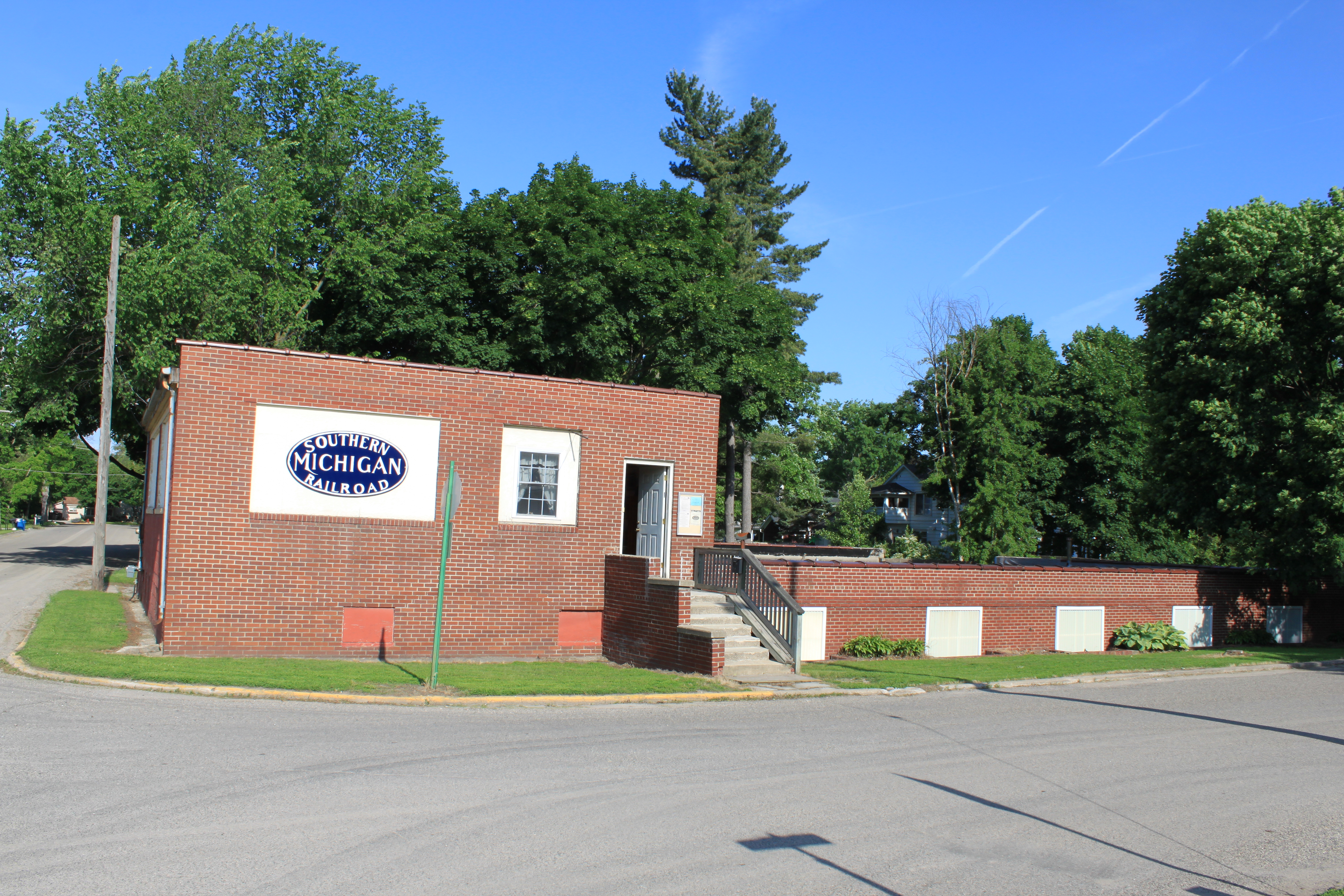
Museum exterior

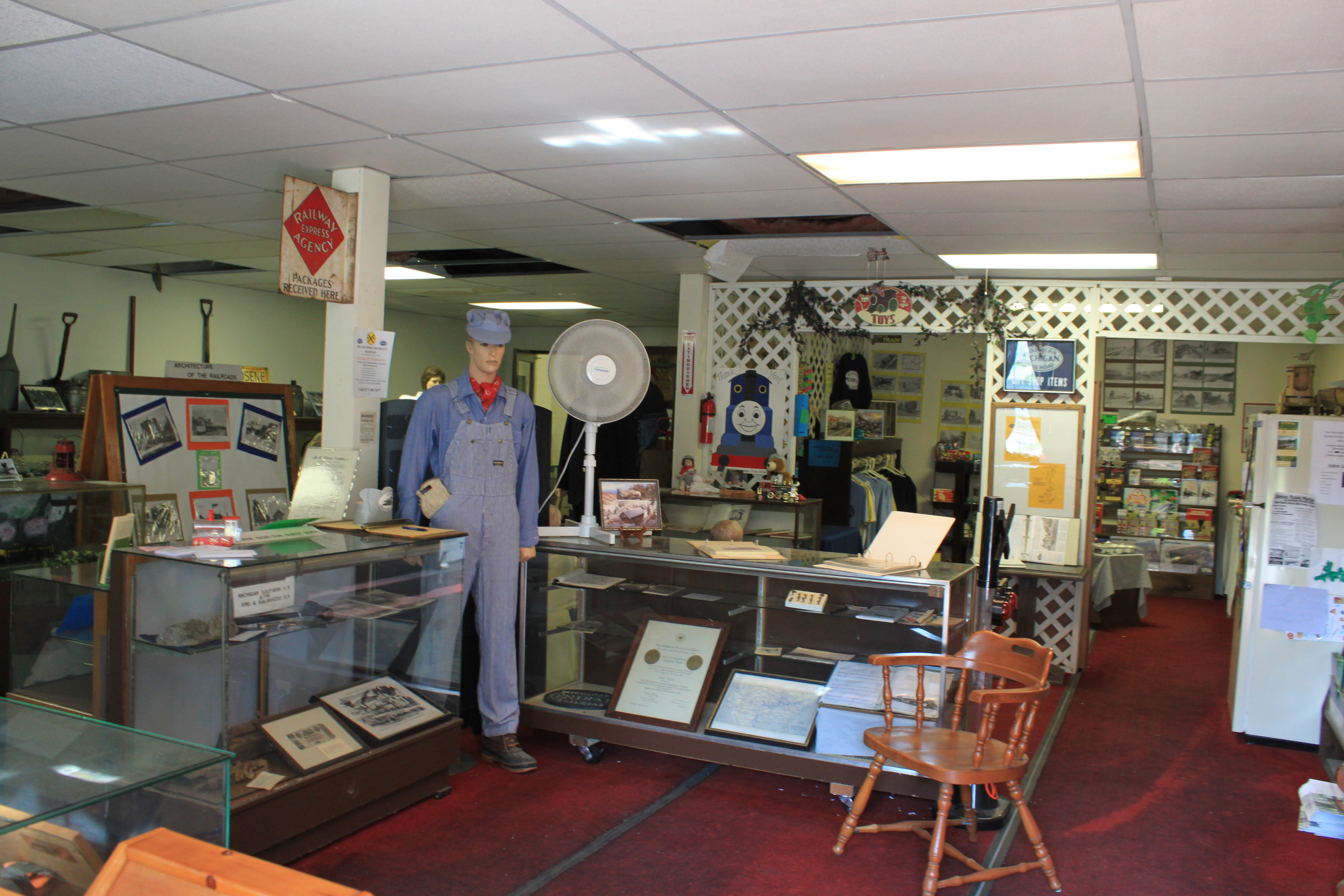
Museum interior

The Society began as the "Lenawee Area Railroaders", an informal association of railway buffs and modelers. They held monthly gatherings in Tecumseh, Clinton, and Adrian, Michigan, and starting in June 1981 they published a newsletter, "The Cross Tracks". In 1982 when it was learned that Conrail would abandon their Clinton Secondary Track they founded the nonprofit Southern Michigan Railroad Society, a volunteer membership organization, "to back an attempt by local citizens to purchase and preserve the former New York Central Railroad's Clinton Branch rail line."

In 1983 the Society purchased the abandoned former Clinton Engines building, located adjacent to the railroad at 320 S. Division Street from The Village of Clinton for a nominal sum. In July 1984, they reached agreement with Conrail to purchase the railroad, for $100,000.

In 1985, a small "track speeder" motorcar had been donated to the Society, and during Clinton's Fall Festival, speeder rides were improvised for the public. This was successful. The Society was able to obtain other motorcars, and for several years operated a successful passenger service while they gathered funds to truck in full-size equipment. At the height of motorcar operation, there were two "motorcar trains" of up to 5 motorcars running simultaneously between Clinton and Tecumseh.

The first large equipment to be obtained was an operating Plymouth locomotive and two cabooses. Within a few years, this was augmented with a pipe gondola car fitted for carrying passengers. Later, a 1920 Chicago South Shore interurban car was added to the train. Additional locomotives arrived, including a former Western Maryland Railway GE 44-ton and the GMDH-3.

In September 2009 a hostile takeover attempt was launched against the Society by a Tecumseh-area property developer and lawyer.

In 2013 the Society acquired a 22,000 square foot shop building in Clinton to be used as a maintenance and restoration facility.

== Heritage railroad ==
The railroad runs 13.5 miles (21.7 km) from Clinton, Michigan, through Tecumseh, Michigan, to Lenawee Junction, Michigan. This line is the second railroad constructed in the State of Michigan, and the first branch line. It was originally the Palmyra and Jacksonburgh Railroad, running between Palmyra (near Lenawee Junction) and Jackson, Michigan.

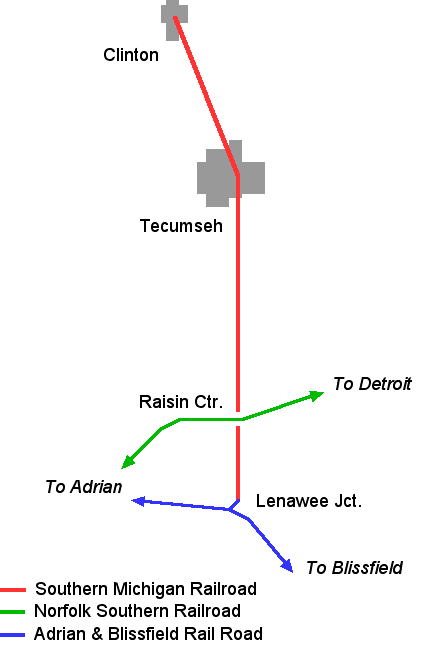
Southern Michigan Railroad route map

The railroad runs 5 miles (8.0 km) between the towns of Clinton and Tecumseh during the summer months and 6.5 miles (10.5 km) from Tecumseh to the rural railroad junction of Raisin Center, where the track originally crossed the Norfolk Southern mainline. An additional two miles of track (now disconnected from the northern section) runs from Raisin Center to Lenawee Junction. Most trains operate between the Clinton and Tecumseh, permitting stopovers. In October, "Fall Color Tours" traditionally used the longer 6.5-mile (10.5 km) segment to Raisin Center, although in 2014 and 2015 they were run between Clinton and Tecumseh instead. Fall Color Tours will return to its traditional route in 2016.

A notable feature of the line is Bridge 15, a Howe deck truss bridge listed in the National Register of Historic Places.

== Operations ==
Operations typically run from May to October and December, usually operating between Clinton and Tecumseh. Special events include Clinton's Fall Festival in late September, color tours between Tecumseh and Raisin Center in October, and a "Santa train" in December.

The train typically includes a South Shore car, passenger gondola and a caboose or two, powered by a 44-ton diesel.

== Collection ==
Among the Society's equipment:

- The two Ann Arbor ALCO RS-1 locomotives, #20 and #21. #20 is located in Shepherd, Michigan in static display. #21 will be undergoing a study for return to service in 2015.
- The only General Motors GMDH-3 diesel-hydraulic locomotive ever built. It is not currently operational.
- Former Western Maryland GE 44-ton switcher #75, in operation on most trips.
- Former Detroit and Mackinac Railway GE 44-ton switcher #10, built for the M&STL as their D-742, recently acquired and awaiting restoration to operational service.
- The last mechanically intact New York Central MU Car, #4330 (numbered Penn Central 1291).
- Two 1920 Chicago South Shore cars, #1 and #36.
- The former Pullman sleeper "Emerald Vale", later used by the Ann Arbor Railroad as a work train car.
- New York Central bay window caboose #21692.
- New Haven Railroad caboose #C-626, for a time repainted as Penn Central #19882, a caboose which ran on this line.
- A large collection of "track speeder" railway motorcars.
- A small Plymouth locomotive.
- An Ann Arbor Railroad boxcar.
- Two flat cars.
- Grand Trunk Western transfer caboose #75053.
- An NYC Pipe Gondola converted to open air passenger car.
- 45 ton Switcher Number 2022 nicknamed "Little Red"
- 44 ton Switcher Number 3 (ex charlotte Southern)
- Triple Crown RoadRailer, acquired in 2026, plans are to have a display exhibit inside the trailer, detailing the history and evolution of the RoadRailer.
