= Palmyra and Jacksonburgh Railroad =

Map

The Palmyra Jacksonburgh Railroad, located in Southern Michigan, was the first railway system in the state of Michigan. It was abandoned in 1981 but is now an active railroad museum.

== History ==
In April 1833, the Erie and Kalamazoo Railroad company was given a charter to start the building of a railroad. The Palmyra Jacksonburgh Railroad was the first railway in the state of Michigan. It was built in 1837 - the year that Michigan became a state - as the Tecumseh branch. The charter that was received in 1833 granted them the ability to create a 46-mile-long (74 km) railway that would run through Clinton, Michigan and finish in Jacksonburgh (which is now known as Jackson). The new railroad branch tried to start building in 1838, but because of financial problems the railroad could not be built. However, in 1844 it was sold to the state to be operated by the Southern Railroad, which two years later became the Michigan Southern.

After a few years construction began once more. The railroad reached Clinton in 1853, Manchester in 1855, and finally Jacksonburgh in 1857. In 1855, it became part of the Northern Indiana Railroad. Once reaching Jacksonburgh, the branch was completed as the Palmyra Jacksonburgh Railroad. It was bought by the New York Central Railroad system in 1915. From this point until around the 1930s, this railroad was among the causes of the expansion of Southern Michigan.

However, starting in the 1930s the use of the train began to dwindle due to increasing automobile ridership. The railroad lost significant revenues from the lack of passenger service. The system still ran on importing and exporting goods throughout the country. In 1963 and 1965 the tracks between Clinton and Jackson were removed, cutting the branch off from businesses. New York Central folded into Penn Central Railroad in 1968. In 1970 Penn Central filed for bankruptcy in 1970, and in 1981 its successor, Conrail, filed to abandon the track.

== Southern Michigan Railroad Society ==
In 1985 the Southern Michigan Railroad Society, led by three high school students, purchased the Clinton Branch and transformed it into an operating railroad museum. The society continues to preserve, restore, and to educate the public about the first railroad in Michigan. They offer various trips on the remaining tracks of what used to be an operating railroad, and work on a volunteer basis.

== Historical Tours ==
Many of the events they offer are a tour during the Clinton Fall Festival, a tour during the Appleumpkin Festival, and the Fall Colors tour. They also feature a few winter excursions. These are the Tecumseh Holiday Open House, and a tour through the Tecumseh Holiday Lighted Parade.
