= Clinton Downtown Historic District (Clinton, Michigan) =

Historic district in Michigan, United States

- U.S. National Register of Historic Places
- U.S. Historic district
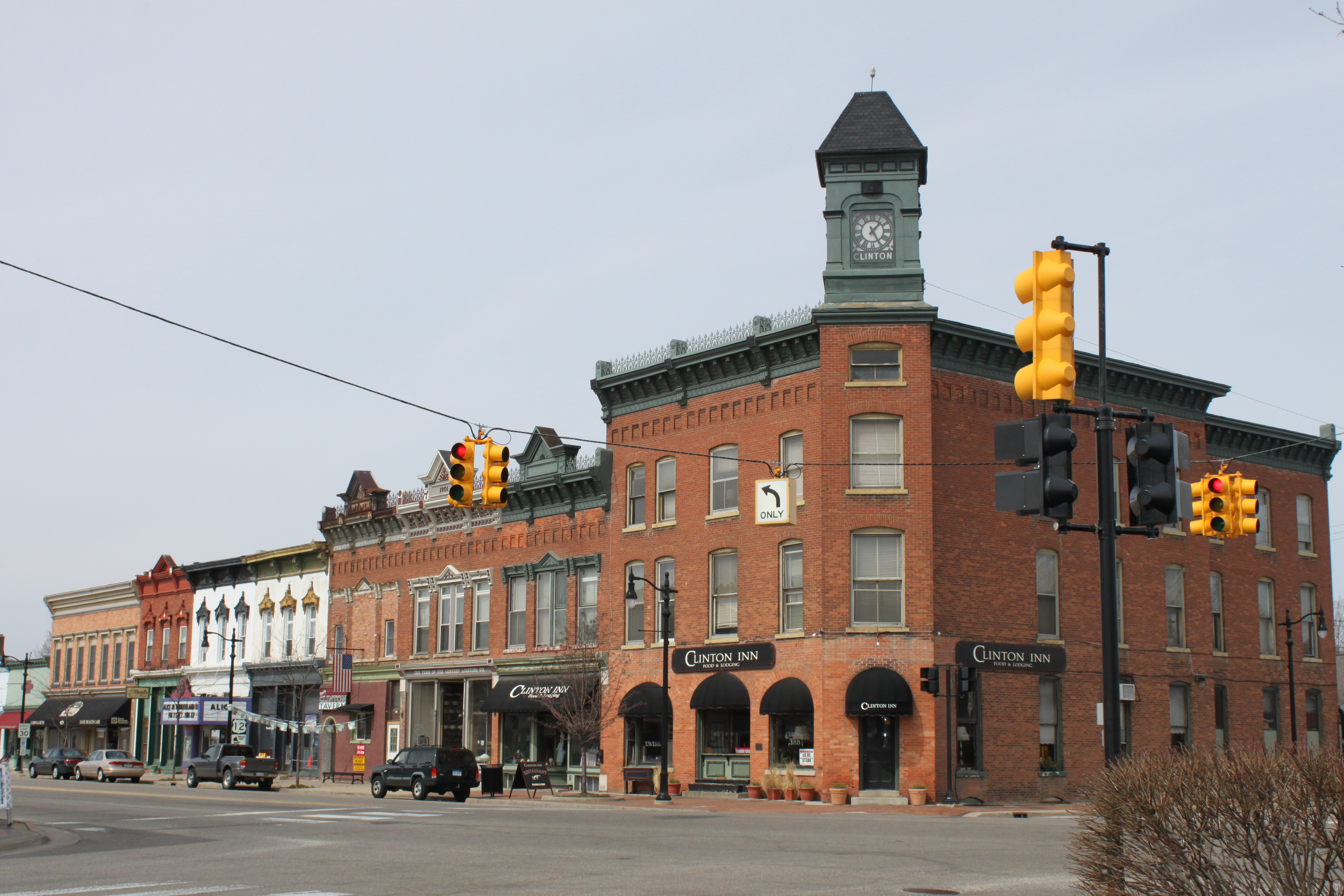
- Clinton Inn and nearly buildings.

- Location within Michigan Location within the United States
- Interactive map showing the location of Clinton Downtown Historic District
- Location: 101-151 and 104-200 W. Michigan Ave., Clinton, Michigan
- Coordinates: 42°04′19″N 83°58′21″W
- Architectural style: Late Victorian, Greek Revival, Richardsonian Romanesque
- NRHP reference No.: 10000220
- Added to NRHP: April 27, 2010

The Clinton Downtown Historic District is a historic district located in the village of Clinton in Clinton Township in the northernmost portion of Lenawee County, Michigan. It consists of most of the 100 block of U.S. Route 12, known locally as West Michigan Avenue, plus Memorial Park at 200 West Michigan. The district was added to the National Register of Historic Places on April 27, 2010.

== History ==
The district traces its origin back to the village's original platting in 1833 and incorporation in 1837. The earliest buildings still extant in the historic district date from this period, and include a frame structure at 117-121 West Michigan and brick structures at 135 and 141 West Michigan. The district grew due to its location on the Chicago Road and the River Raisin. By 1838, the village had 600 people, along with post office, a bank, up to twelve dry goods stores, three grocery stores, two drug stores, mills, taverns, clothing shops, and other establishments. Many of these businesses were located in what is now the central business district.

After the completion of the branch railroad line in 1853, economic growth in Clinton boomed. Frame structures in the downtown were replaced with masonry buildings. Prosperity continued through the end of the 19th century, resulting in a building boom that began in the 1880s, peaked in the mid-1890s, and continued with a few major buildings constructed in the early 1900s. A few more buildings were added to the district in the 1910s, and Memorial Park, which anchors the edge of the district, was created in 1919.

== Description ==
The Clinton Downtown Historic District contains twenty-nine commercial buildings, a town hall, and a memorial park, arranged along a block of Michigan Avenue. The buildings represent an intact and cohesive assemblage of structures, spanning a range of architectural styles from Greek Revival through late nineteenth-century commercial blocks, Italianate buildings, and early twentieth century automobile-related buildings. Construction dates range from the mid-nineteenth century through the mid-twentieth century, with the oldest buildings dating to the 1830s. Most structures in the district are brick or masonry, and the vast majority of the buildings in the district are two-story, two-part brick commercial blocks.

The two most visually striking buildings in the district are the Clinton Inn at 106 West Michigan Avenue and the Town Hall at 172 West Michigan Avenue. The Clinton Inn was constructed in 1900-01, and is the tallest and largest building in the district. It is the only three-story building in the business district, and has a distinctive diagonally positioned square-plan corner tower, facing the intersection, which contains the entrance to the hotel. At the top is a square clock tower with a pyramidal roof, containing clocks on three sides. The Michigan Avenue facade left contains three broad arched openings at street level, with the facade on the upper stories divided into three bays, marked by large brackets of the main cornice. The Jackson street facade is divided into seven bays defined by columns of single square-head windows.

The Town Hall was constructed in 1876 as a joint venture between the Village and Township of Clinton and by Clinton's Masonic lodge, and the building continues to be owned by the township and the Masons. The building is a two-story brick eclectic Late Victorian structure with a hipped roof and arched entryway. The facade is three bays wide, and contains the center entry door flanked by paired double hung sash windows. The second story contains three sets of paired double hung sash windows. The bays are emphasized by projecting brick piers placed at the building corners and between the window pairs, rising from a fieldstone foundation.
