= GMD GMDH-1 =

Canadian experimental diesel-hydraulic locomotive

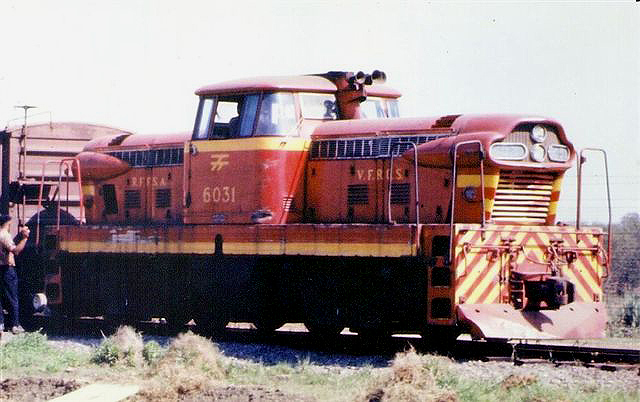
- VRFGS 6031 operating in Brazil
Type and origin
- Power type: Diesel-hydraulic
- Builder: General Motors Diesel
- Serial number: A1597, A1713, A1811–A1812
- Model: GMDH1
- Build date: 1955–1959
- Total produced: 4
Specifications
- Configuration
  - AAR: B-B
  - UIC: B′B′
- Length: 9.6 metres (31 ft)
- Width: 3.05 metres (10.0 ft)
- Height: 3.6 metres (12 ft)
- Loco weight: First two: 52 short tons (46 long tons; 47 t); Last two: 74 short tons (66 long tons; 67 t)
- Prime mover: First two: 2 × Detroit Diesel 6-110; Last two: 2 × Detroit Diesel Series 71
- Transmission: Hydraulic
Performance figures
- Maximum speed: 65 km/h (40 mph)
- Power output: First two: 600 hp (450 kW); Last two: 800 hp (600 kW)
Career
- Class: GMDH-1, MDC-D6
- Nicknames: Blue Goose (GMDD 1001)
- Disposition: 2 preserved, 2 scrapped

The GMD GMDH-1 is an experimental diesel-hydraulic switcher locomotive built by the Canadian locomotive manufacturer General Motors Diesel. Four locomotives were built as demonstrations between December 1955 to October 1959. The GMDH-1 operated for several companies in Canada, the United States, Brazil, and Pakistan.

== History ==
Four locomotives were built as demonstrations by the General Motors Diesel of London, Ontario. The locomotives were built predominantly for the export market. Production on the GMDH-1 class started in December 1955 and ended in October 1959, alongside the GMD GMDH-3 being completed in January 1960. The first two locomotives were each fitted with a pair of 6-cylinder Detroit Diesel series 110 engines, giving a combined 600 horsepower (450 kW), while the last two locomotives were fitted with a pair of series 71 engines with a combined 800 hp (600 kW). The locomotives were also fitted with Torqmatic hydraulic transmissions and Torqmatic dynamic brakes. Multiple engines could be connected and controlled as multiple units if required. The maximum speed the locomotives could operate at was 65 kilometres per hour (40 mph).

=== First locomotive ===
The first locomotive, given the serial number A1597, was completed in December 1956 and numbered GMDD 1001. The locomotive was originally painted in a two-tone blue and spent its first two years of service in demonstration runs and on display. The locomotive was nicknamed the "Blue Goose" in reference to its livery. In April 1958, the locomotive was repainted yellow and became the GMD plant switcher. GMDD 1001 was replaced by EMD SW1500 No. 113, and was retired in November 1975. The locomotive was given to the Canadian Railroad Historical Association in July 1977, and passed into the collection of the Canada Science and Technology Museum in November 1986 after being restored by Al Howlett of London, Ontario.

=== Second locomotive ===
The second locomotive, A1713, was completed September 1958, and was numbered GMDD 600. It was sold to Brazil, where it first ran on the Estrada de Ferro Leopoldina, a part of the Estrada de Ferro Sorocabana. On January 2, 1960, the Estrada de Ferro Sorocabana sold the locomotive to the Rede de Viação Paraná-Santa Catarina. The locomotive was last sold to the Rede Ferroviária Federal Sociedade Anônima, still numbered 600, and transferred to the Viação Férrea do Rio Grande do Sul, renumbered 6031. The locomotive was subsequently scrapped.

=== Third locomotive ===
The third locomotive, A1811, was completed in September 1959 and numbered GMDD 800. GMDD 800 passed through a succession of owners; it was first sold to Electric Reduction Company of Canada Industries Limited, where it was given a new plate dated May 1961 and renumbered 89. Electric Reduction Company sold it to Ennis-Paikin Steel Ltd.—a railroad equipment dealer located in Hamilton, Ontario—in October 1972. The locomotive was then sold to Limestone Quarries Ltd. of Uhthoff, Ontario in October 1973, renumbered 3-6902. It was sold again to Ennis-Paikin in September 1978, who resold it in February 1980 to Raritan River Steel of Perth Amboy, New Jersey, renumbered 3. After being rebuilt by Peacock Bros. of Edmonton, the locomotive was sold to Hudson Bay Oil & Gas in Kaybob, Alberta, also numbered 3, in January 1981. Hudson Oil & Gas was bought by Dome Petroleum later in 1981, which was later bought by Amoco in 1988, for whom the locomotive operated. It was then sold to SemCAMS, where it operates as of 2010.

=== Fourth locomotive ===
The fourth and last locomotive, A1812, was completed October 1959 and numbered as GMDD 801. The locomotive was purchased by the contracting firm Guy F. Atkinson Company and renumbered 28151. In May 1962, the locomotive was re-gauged to 5 ft 6 in (1,676 mm) gauge and shipped to Pakistan, where it was reclassified as an MDC-D6 while keeping its number 28151. It worked for a construction company to assist in the building of the Mangla Dam. The locomotive resided in Pakistan until it was subsequently scrapped.

== See also ==
- List of GMD Locomotives
