= GMD GMDH-3 =

Canadian experimental diesel-hydraulic locomotive

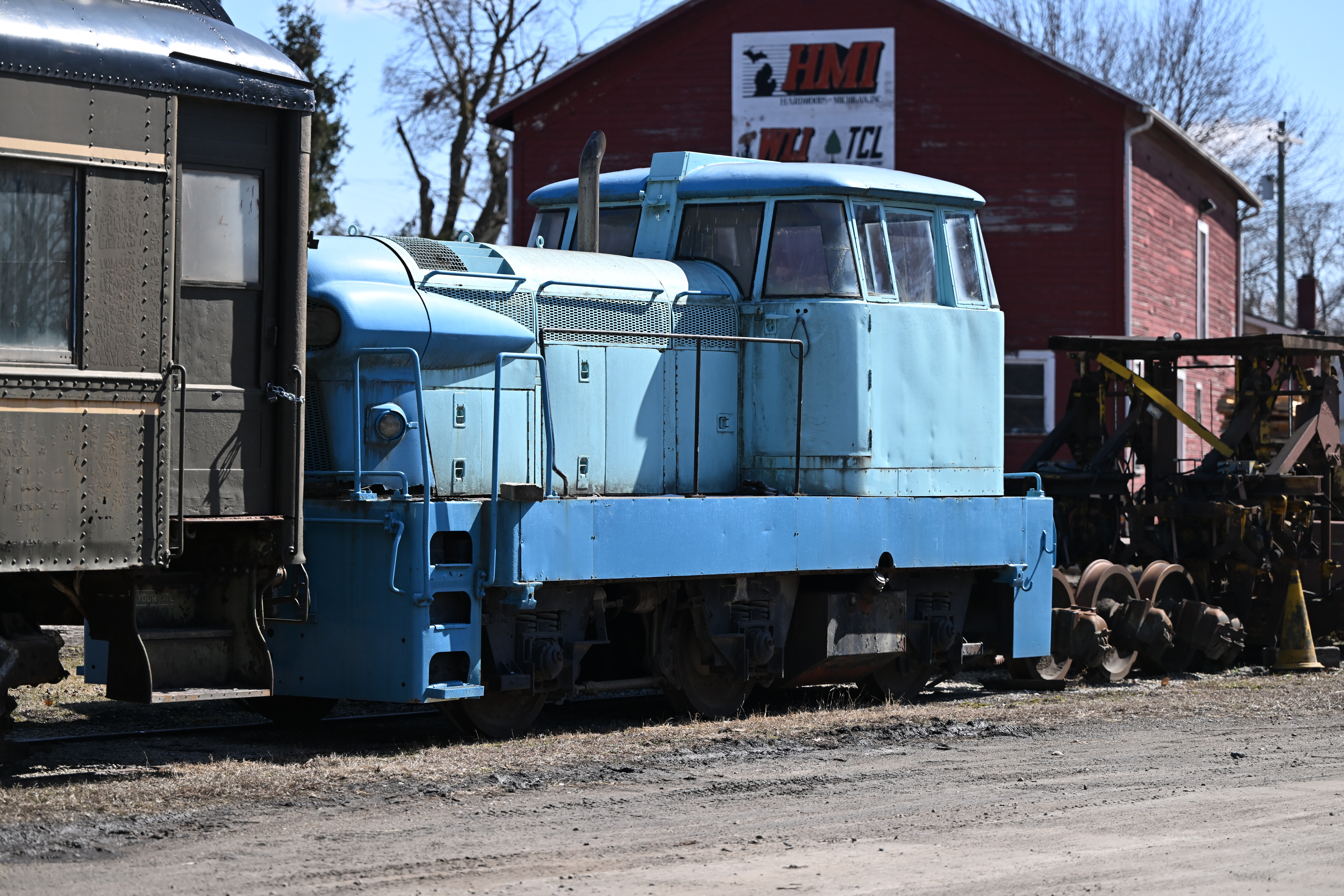
- The sole GMDH-3 at the Southern Michigan Railroad Society in 2023
Type and origin
- Power type: Diesel-hydraulic
- Builder: General Motors Diesel
- Serial number: A1813
- Model: GMDH-3
- Build date: January 1960
- Total produced: 1
Specifications
- Configuration
  - Whyte: 0-6-0DH
  - AAR: C
  - UIC: C
- Gauge: 4 ft 8 1/2 in (1,435 mm)
- Length: 28 ft 1 1/2 in (8.57 m)
- Width: 8 ft 10 1/4 in (2.70 m)
- Height: 11 ft 5 in (3.48 m)
- Adhesive weight: 75,000 lb (34,000 kilograms)
- Loco weight: 75,000 lb (34,000 kilograms); 37.5 short tons (33.5 long tons; 34.0 t)
- Fuel capacity: 330 US gal (1,200 L; 270 imp gal)
- Lubricant cap.: 7.8 US gal (30 L; 6.5 imp gal) engine, 25.2 US gal (95 L; 21.0 imp gal) transmission, 6 US gal (23 L; 5.0 imp gal) gearboxes
- Coolant cap.: 24 US gal (91 L; 20 imp gal)
- Sandbox cap.: 14 cu ft (0.40 m^{3})
- Prime mover: Detroit Diesel 8V-71
- Cylinders: V8
- Transmission: Hydraulic; Allison CBTA 5842 automatic transmission, 3 × Dana Spicer gearboxes.
- Couplers: AAR Type E
Performance figures
- Power output: 275 hp (205 kW)
Career
- Disposition: Preserved

The GMD GMDH-3 is an experimental diesel-hydraulic switching locomotive built in January 1960 by General Motors Diesel of Canada. Only one example was built, with GMD serial number A1813. The locomotive was essentially the GMDH-1 design but with only a single hood, a single engine and an end cab, mounted on a six-wheel chassis.

== History ==
After being built in January 1960, the locomotive served as a demonstrator for GMD, bearing number #275. From 1960 and 1962, it spent a period in Egypt, but no sales resulted. The locomotive was sold in 1963 to McKinnon Industries of St. Catharines, Ontario as their plant switcher, #2128. After nearly 30 years of service, it was sold in 1992 to the South Simcoe Railway, a heritage museum railway, in Tottenham, Ontario, but in 1995 it was declared surplus to requirements by the railway's directors.

After a fund-raising effort, the Southern Michigan Railroad Society purchased the locomotive in 1996, where it remains in operable condition as of 2006. As of June 2015, GMDH-3 had been repainted in two-tone blue, and is still parked in Clinton, Michigan awaiting funds for restoration.

== See also ==
- List of GMD Locomotives
