= Clinton, Lenawee County, Michigan =

Clinton, Michigan
- Village
- Village of Clinton
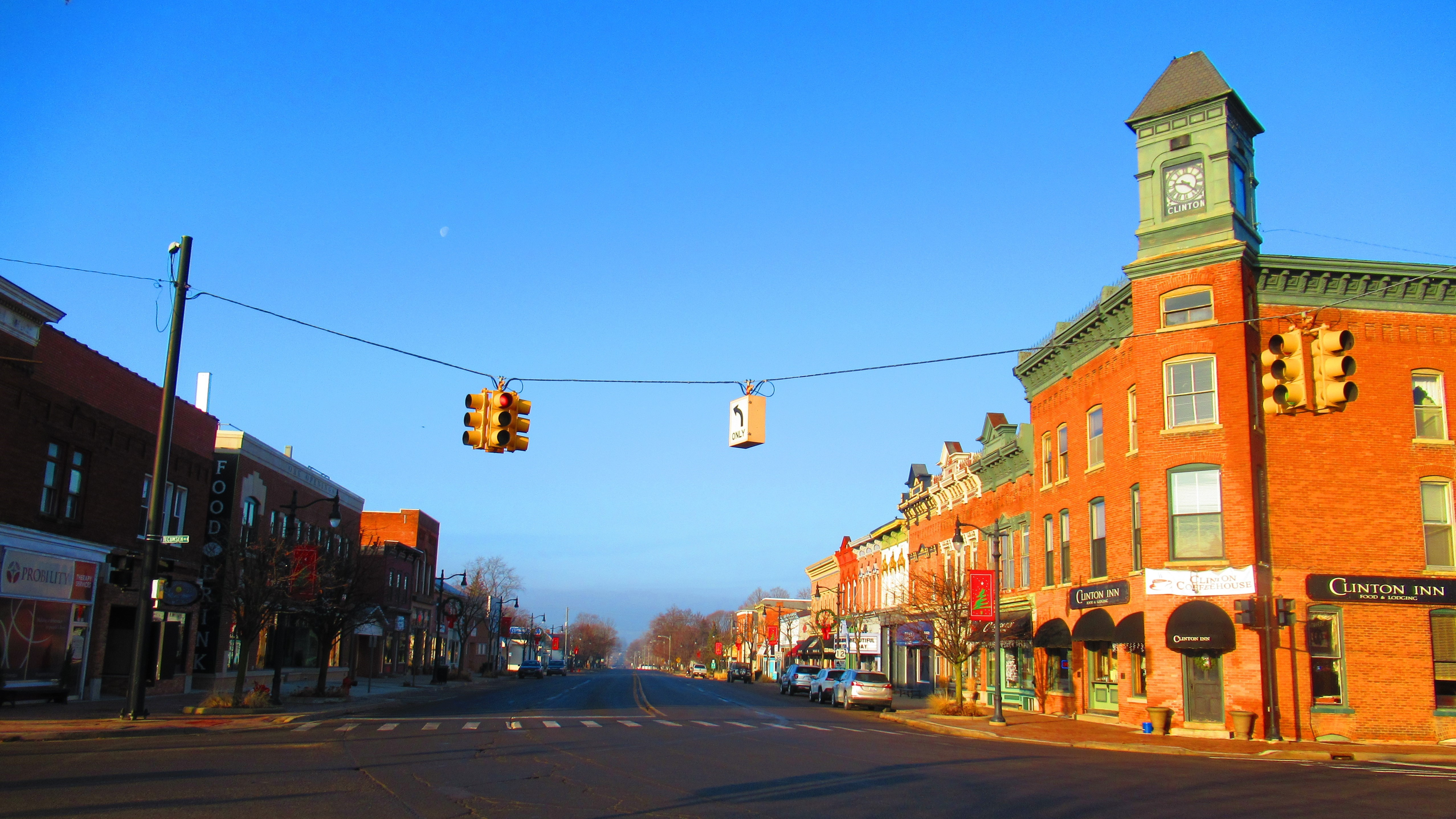
- Downtown Clinton along U.S. Route 12

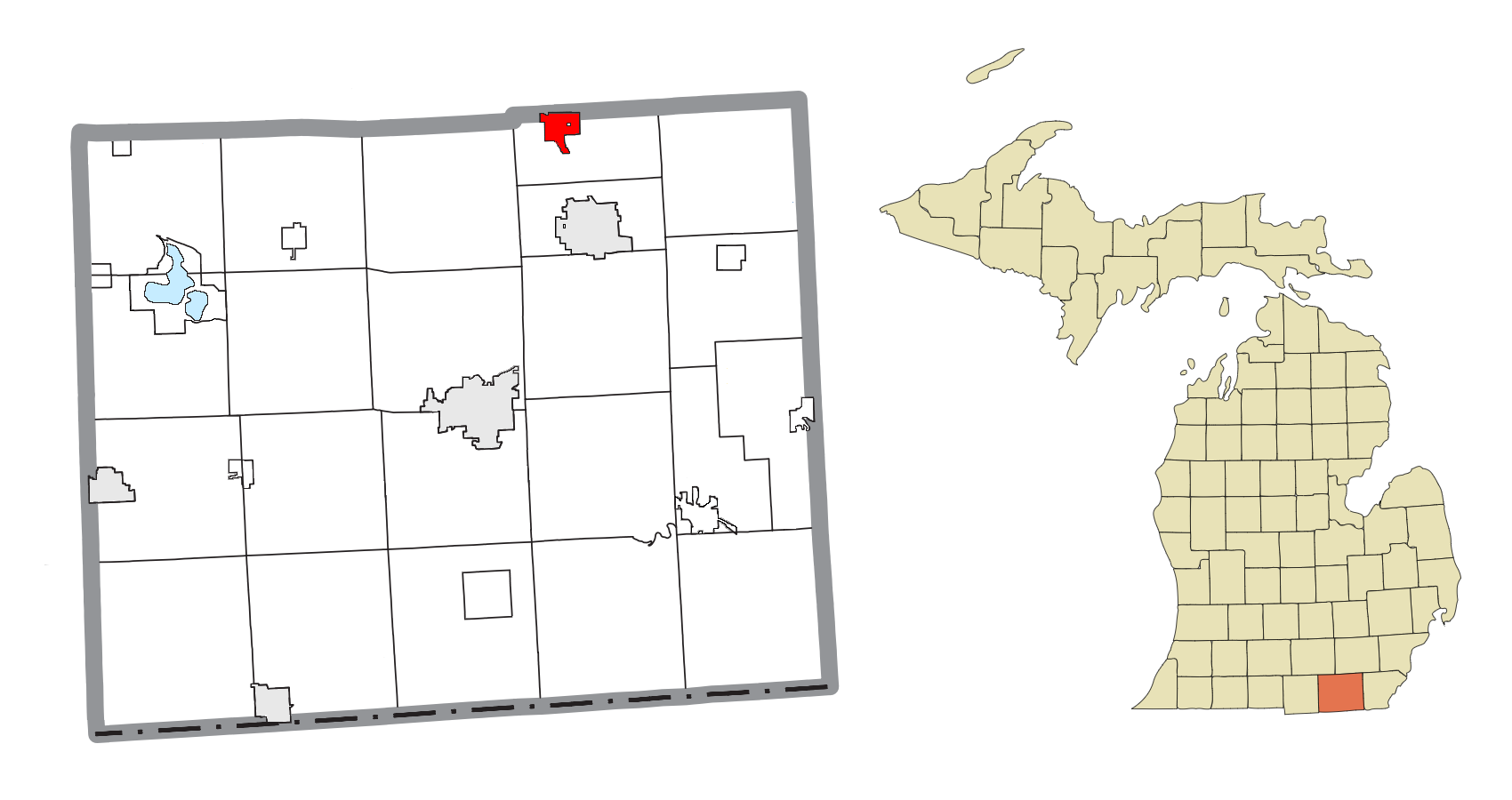
- Location within Lenawee County

- Location in Michigan Location in the United States
- Coordinates: 42°04′14″N 83°58′20″W
- Country: United States
- State: Michigan
- County: Lenawee
- Township: Clinton
- Incorporated: 1837

Government
  - Type: Village council
  - President: Doris Kemner
  - Manager: Kevin Cornish

Area
  - Total: 1.87 sq mi (4.84 km^{2})
  - Land: 1.83 sq mi (4.75 km^{2})
  - Water: 0.035 sq mi (0.09 km^{2})
- Elevation: 837 ft (255 m)

Population (2020)
  - Total: 2,517
  - Density: 1,372.2/sq mi (529.81/km^{2})
- Time zone: UTC-5 (Eastern (EST))
  - Summer (DST): UTC-4 (EDT)
- ZIP code(s): 49236
- Area code: 517
- FIPS code: 26-16480
- GNIS feature ID: 0623474
- Website: www.villageofclinton.org

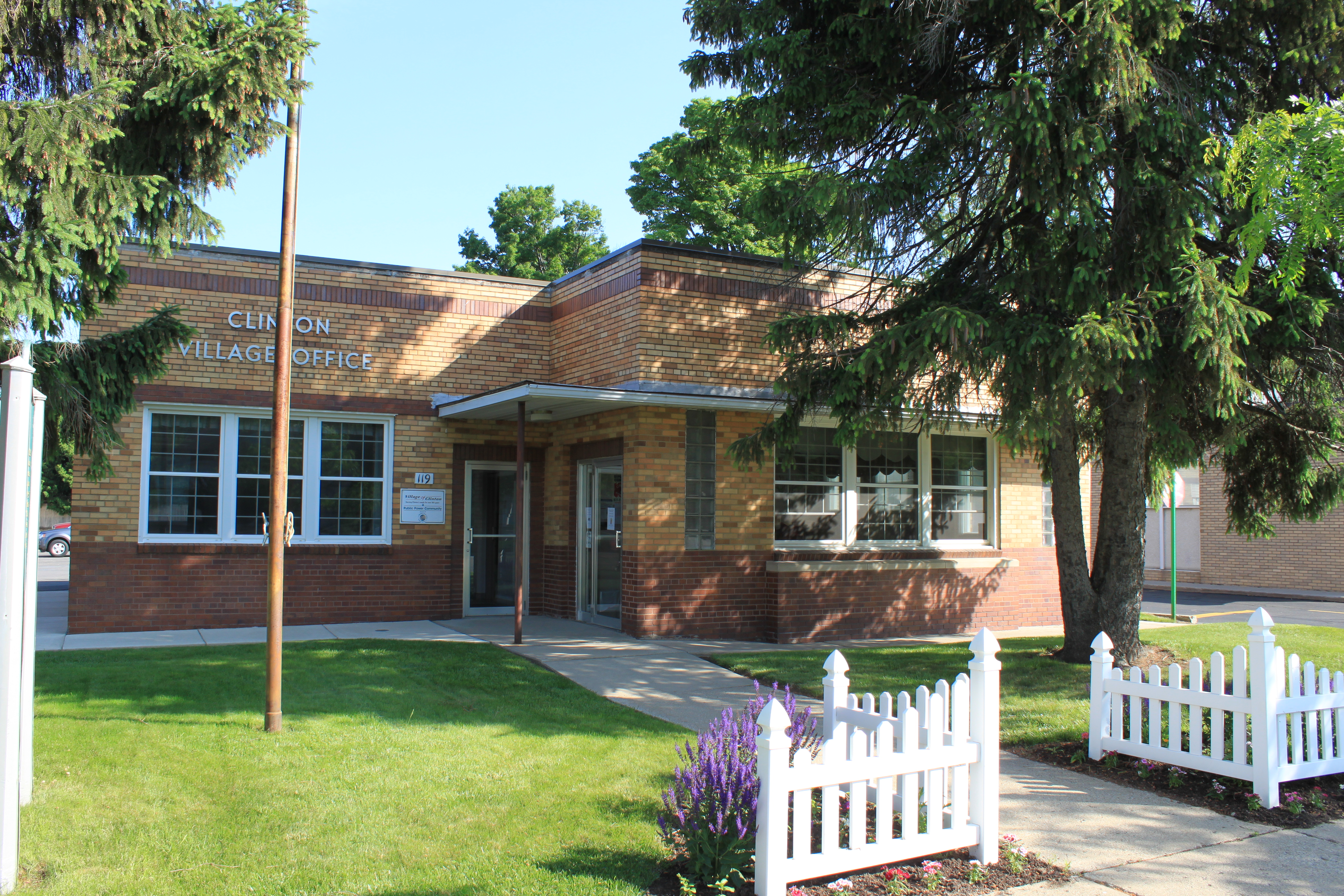
Clinton Village Office

Clinton is a village in Lenawee County in the Irish Hills area of the U.S. state of Michigan. The population was 2,517 at the 2020 census. The village is located within Clinton Township.

Both the village and township are named in honor of DeWitt Clinton, the governor of New York from 1817 to 1828.

== History ==
Clinton was incorporated as a village in 1837.

== Geography ==
According to the United States Census Bureau, the village has a total area of 1.88 square miles (4.87 km^{2}), of which 1.84 square miles (4.77 km^{2}) is land and 0.04 square miles (0.10 km^{2}) is water.

== Demographics ==
Historical population
Census	Pop.	Note	%±
1860	680		—
1870	752		10.6%
1880	927		23.3%
1890	960		3.6%
1900	1,038		8.1%
1910	1,011		−2.6%
1920	961		−4.9%
1930	1,026		6.8%
1940	1,126		9.7%
1950	1,344		19.4%
1960	1,481		10.2%
1970	1,677		13.2%
1980	2,342		39.7%
1990	2,475		5.7%
2000	2,293		−7.4%
2010	2,336		1.9%
2020	2,517		7.7%
U.S. Decennial Census

=== 2010 census ===
As of the census of 2010, there were 2,336 people, 939 households, and 643 families living in the village. The population density was 1,269.6 inhabitants per square mile (490.2/km^{2}). There were 1,053 housing units at an average density of 572.3 per square mile (221.0/km^{2}). The racial makeup of the village was 96.6% White, 0.2% African American, 0.5% Native American, 0.7% Asian, 0.4% from other races, and 1.6% from two or more races. Hispanic or Latino of any race were 2.4% of the population.

There were 939 households, of which 37.2% had children under the age of 18 living with them, 49.6% were married couples living together, 14.3% had a female householder with no husband present, 4.6% had a male householder with no wife present, and 31.5% were non-families. 27.6% of all households were made up of individuals, and 11.1% had someone living alone who was 65 years of age or older. The average household size was 2.49 and the average family size was 3.04.

The median age in the village was 37.2 years. 27% of residents were under the age of 18; 7.5% were between the ages of 18 and 24; 26.6% were from 25 to 44; 26.1% were from 45 to 64; and 12.6% were 65 years of age or older. The gender makeup of the village was 47.1% male and 52.9% female.

=== 2000 census ===
As of the census of 2000, there were 2,293 people, 925 households, and 624 families living in the village. The population density was 1,533.8 inhabitants per square mile (592.2/km^{2}). There were 965 housing units at an average density of 645.5 per square mile (249.2/km^{2}). The racial makeup of the village was 98.52% White, .13% African American, .22% Native American, .13% Asian, .44% from other races, and .57% from two or more races. Hispanic or Latino of any race were 1.66% of the population.

There were 925 households, out of which 33.7% had children under the age of 18 living with them, 52.0% were married couples living together, 12.0% had a female householder with no husband present, and 32.5% were non-families. 27.7% of all households were made up of individuals, and 11.6% had someone living alone who was 65 years of age or older. The average household size was 2.48 and the average family size was 3.03.

In the village, the population was spread out, with 27.3% under the age of 18, 6.9% from 18 to 24, 31.2% from 25 to 44, 20.7% from 45 to 64, and 13.9% who were 65 years of age or older. The median age was 36 years. For every 100 females, there were 90.6 males. For every 100 females age 18 and over, there were 87.7 males.

The median income for a household in the village was $47,961, and the median income for a family was $52,111. Males had a median income of $45,750 versus $29,500 for females. The per capita income for the village was $20,513. About 4.1% of families and 6.5% of the population were below the poverty line, including 10.9% of those under age 18 and 3.3% of those age 65 or over.

== Education ==
Clinton has a school system (Clinton Community Schools) with approximately 1,200 students attending grades PreK-12.

== Major highways ==
- US 12
- M-52 (intersecting road west of Clinton)

== Attractions ==
The Southern Michigan Railroad Society, an operating railroad museum, is based in Clinton.

== Notable people ==
- Bunny Fabrique, professional baseball player for the Brooklyn Robins
- Mathew Sexton, professional American Football player for the Atlanta Falcons, Miami Dolphins, Pittsburgh Steelers, Kansas City Chiefs, Las Vegas Vipers, and San Antonio Brahmas.
