= List of GMD Locomotives =

The following is a list of locomotives produced by General Motors Diesel (GMD), and its corporate successor Electro-Motive Canada (EMC).

The NF-110 and NF-210 locomotive models were narrow gauge locomotives for use on Canadian National Railway's Newfoundland lines, as are the New Zealand DF class for use by Tranz Rail.

GMD locomotive production
Model designation	Build year	Total produced	Wheel arrangement	Prime mover	Power output	Image
SW8	1950–1954	65	B-B	8-567B	800 hp (600 kW)	
SW9	1951–1953	29	B-B	12-567B	1,200 hp (890 kW)	
SW900	1953–1969	97	B-B	8-567C	900 hp (670 kW)	
SW1200	1956–1964	23	B-B	12-567C	1,200 hp (890 kW)	
SW1200RS	1955–1960	264	B-B	12-567C	1,200 hp (890 kW)	
GMDH-1	1956–1959	4	B-B	Detroit 6-110; Detroit series 71	600 hp (450 kW); 800 hp (600 kW)	
GMDH-3	1960	1	C	Detroit V8-71	275 hp (210 kW)	
MP15AC	1984	4	B-B	12-645E	1,500 hp (1,120 kW)	
F7A	1950–1952	80	B-B	16-567B	1,500 hp (1,100 kW)	
FP7	1950–1953	57	B-B	16-567B	1,500 hp (1,100 kW)	
F7B	1951–1953	47	B-B	16-567B	1,500 hp (1,100 kW)	
FP9	1954–1958	54	B-B	16-567C	1,750 hp (1,300 kW)	
F9B	1954–1958	46	B-B	16-567C	1,750 hp (1,300 kW)	
GP7	1950–1953	112	B-B	16-567B	1,500 hp (1,100 kW)	
GP9	1954–1963	646	B-B	16-567C	1,750 hp (1,300 kW)	
GP9m	1958	1	B-B	16-567C	1,500 hp (1,100 kW)	
GP7L-m	1978	5	B-B	16-567C	1,500 hp (1,100 kW)	
GMD-1	1958–1959	18	B-B	12-567C	1,200 hp (890 kW)	
GMD-1	1958–1960	83	A1A-A1A	12-567C	1,200 hp (890 kW)	
GP30	1963	2	B-B	16-567D3	2,250 hp (1,680 kW)	
GP35	1964–1966	26	B-B	16-567D3	2,500 hp (1,900 kW)	
GP38AC	1970–1971	21	B-B	16-645E	2,000 hp (1,500 kW)	
GP38-2	1972–1986	204	B-B	16-645E	2,000 hp (1,500 kW)	
GP38-2W	1973–1974	51	B-B	16-645E	2,000 hp (1,500 kW)	
GP40	1966–1967	16	B-B	16-645E3	3,000 hp (2,200 kW)	
GP40TC	1968	8	B-B	16-645E3	3,000 hp (2,200 kW)	
GP40-2(W)	1973–1975	11	B-B	16-645E3	3,000 hp (2,200 kW)	
GP40-2LW	1974–1976	268	B-B	16-645E3	3,000 hp (2,200 kW)	
F40PH	1978	6	B-B	16-645E3	3,000 hp (2,200 kW)	
F40PH-2	1986–1989	59	B-B	16-645E3	3,200 hp (2,400 kW)	
F59PH	1988–1990	42	B-B	16-710G3	3,000 hp (2,200 kW)	
NF110	1952, 1953	9	C-C	12-567	1,200 hp (890 kW)	
NF210	1956–1960	38	C-C	12-567	1,200 hp (890 kW)	
SD38-2	1972–1979	4	C-C	16-645E	2,000 hp (1,500 kW)	
SD40	1966–1972	340	C-C	16-645E3	3,000 hp (2,200 kW)	
SD40-2	1972–1985	619	C-C	16-645E3	3,000 hp (2,200 kW)	
SD40-2W	1975–1980	123	C-C	16-645E3	3,000 hp (2,200 kW)	
SD40-2F	1988–1989	25	C-C	16-645E3	3,000 hp (2,200 kW)	
SD50F	1985–1987	60	C-C	16-645F3B	3,500 hp (2,600 kW)	
SD60F	1985–1989	64	C-C	16-710G3A	3,800 hp (2,800 kW)	
G8	1954–1965	23	A1A-A1A	8-567	875 hp (652 kW)	
GL8	1954	2		8-567	875 hp (652 kW)	
B12	1953	9	B-B	12-567		
B12	1955, 1957	40	A1A-A1A	12-567		
G12	1953–1964	676	B-B	12-567	1,310 hp (980 kW)	
G12	1954–1967	292	A1A-A1A	12-567	1,425 hp (1,063 kW)	
G18B	1990	5	B-B	8-645		
EMD G18U6	1968-1971	8	A1A-A1A	8-645E	1,100 hp (820 kW)	
GT18L-2	1988	16		8-645		
GT18LC-2	1988	12	C-C	8-645		
GT18LC-2M	1988	5	C-C	8-645		
G22CU	1979	30	C-C	12-645		
New Zealand DF class (GL22MC)	1979–1980	30	C-C	12-645	1,650 hp (1,230 kW)	
GL22MC	1979	3	C-C	12-645		
SW1200MG	1963–1971	9	B-B	2.4 kV, 60 Hz; AC electric	1,200 hp (890 kW)	
GF6C	1983–1984	7	C-C	50 kV, 60 Hz; AC electric	6,000 hp (4,470 kW)	
HBU-4	1978–1980	23	B-B	Slug		
YBU-4	1980	12	B-B	Slug		
BC6	1958–1959	30		Heater car		
EMD Class 66	1998-2015	659	C-C	12N-710G3B-EC	3,000 hp (2,200 kW)	
GT26CWP	1976	25	C-C	16-645		
GT26HCW-2	1989–1994	20	C-C	16-645		
G22W-AC	1980–1982	228		12-645		
GT22LC-2	1979–1987	65	C-C	12-645		
JT22MC	1984	15		12-645		
GT22LC	1985–1986	28	C-C	12-645		
GT26C	1976	15	C-C	16-645		
GT26CW	1973	25	C-C	16-645		
G26	1973, 1980	64	C-C	645	2,200 hp (1,640 kW)	
G26CW	1975–1976	15	C-C	16-645		
G26MC-2	1986–2008	48	C-C	16-645E	2,250 hp (1,680 kW)	
GT26CW-2	1981–1984	67	C-C	16-645		
