= Roadrailer =

Trailer capable of running on railway tracks

RoadRailers were a trailer or semi-trailer that could be hauled on roads by a tractor unit and then by way of a fifth wheel coupling, operate in a unit train on railway lines. The RoadRailer system allowed trailers to be pulled by locomotives without the use of flatcars, instead attaching trailers directly to bogies.

== Overview ==
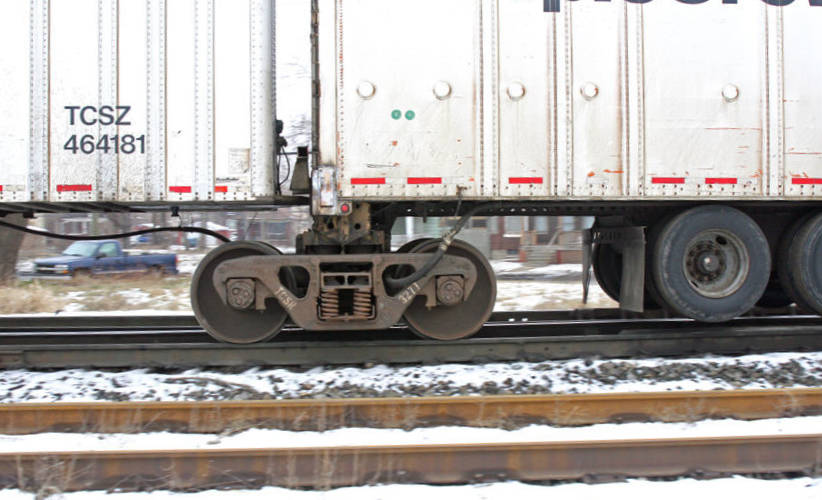
Side view of a Roadrailer's dedicated regular truck showing the connection between two trailer bodies. This image shows only one fifth wheel.

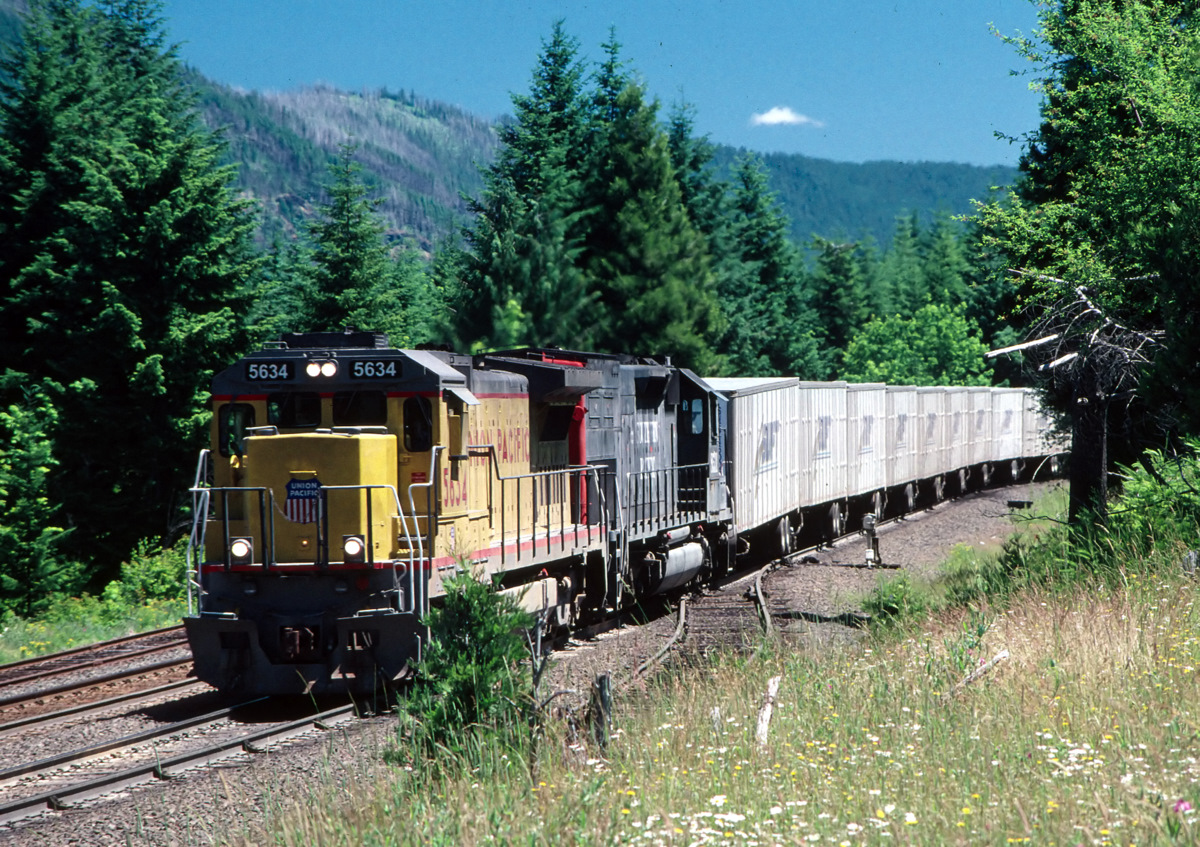
Northbound Roadrailer at Fields, July 1998

The advantage of using roadrailers was their ability to be used directly behind other freight (or even passenger) equipment without the use of trailer flatcars.

Roadrailers first appeared on American railroads in the 1950s. The trailers were built with integrated railroad wheelsets that could be lowered into position when the trailer was pulled behind a train. More modern roadrailers did not include integrated railroad wheels, but rode on regular trucks that do double-duty, having served as articulation points between multiple trailers in a train. Each regular truck is equipped with one fifth wheel at one end and a connector plate at the other end. The connector plate slid into a female receptacle on the rear of the trailer in front and was secured with a steel pin. At the head of a Road Railer train there was an adaptor truck equipped with one fifth wheel and one regular AAR Type "E" or Type "F" automatic coupler. Each semi-trailer had one king pin at each end. Because the truck (bogie) was significantly lighter than a rail flatcar or well-car, roadrailer freight trains were much lighter and therefore were more energy efficient than traditional intermodal trains.

RoadRailers were built by the Bi-Modal Corporations in the early 1980s located in West Chester, Pennsylvania. The trailers were built by the Budd Company locally with the integration of the wheelsets and railroad braking system done at the nearby Bi-Modal factory. This was a modern up-date of Chesapeake & Ohio Railway's RoadRailers introduced in 1955. The railroad wheelsets attached to the aft portion of the trailer were lowered pneumatically by activating a control valve on the left rear of the trailer. To transfer from highway mode to rail mode, the trailer driver would position the trailer over tracks laid into a paved rail yard. First the operator would activate the valve to exhaust air from the airbags that supported the trailer in the highway mode. In the fully lowered or squat position, hooks holding the railwheel set above the road surface released. Then the operator would move the valve to inflate the two airbags used for rail mode. These air bags were similar to those used in passenger rail cars at the time. After being fully transferred, the trailer would be fully level and ready for connection to the next trailer in the train. A similar system was trialed in the UK, though the concept proved unsuccessful, partly due to the reduction in load volume required to fit inside the UK's smaller loading gauge, and also due to objections by the powerful rail and road transport unions.

Throughout the early 1980s various railroads experimented with the RoadRailer concept to determine if the equipment would be sufficiently durable to endure railroad use. The positive attributes of the RoadRailer were its exceptionally smooth ride, light weight and low capital costs to establish a rail yard. Since no flatcars were involved, no crane systems were needed to transfer the trailers between modes. During one demonstration test a train of RoadRailers was broken down in the middle of an industrial street in Portland, Oregon which happened to have track in the street, demonstrating the flexibility of the system. Another note was that a RoadRailer train did not have a caboose, which at the time was still required for freight trains. A box was designed with a yellow strobe light, and equipment for monitoring air pressure through the brake line was designed to be installed in the unused coupler of the last car. Later, as cabooses were phased out, railroads moved to their current use of an end-of-train device to mark the end of the train.

In 1982, Conrail operated a route between Buffalo, Rochester and Highbridge in New York State, called the Empire State Xpress, operated by Bi-Modal subsidiary Road-Rail Transportation Company. The concept was to offer customers rapid freight service that would be competitive with traditional over-the-road service. Dedicated trains left Buffalo and Highbridge each evening, arriving early the next morning. The line was eventually shut down after never establishing enough key customers to utilize the service. In 1992, Amtrak began a trial of RailRoaders to carry mail attached to passenger trains. It was deemed unsuccessful.

In 1991, the RoadRailer concept was purchased by Wabash National Corporation.

The primary reason that the original RoadRailer concept was not viable was the weight penalty imposed on the trailers because of the attached railroad wheelset. This was resolved in later designs which removed the integrated wheelset by having a dedicated rail bogie assembly that stayed in the rail yard, as seen today.

Triple Crown, a subsidiary of Norfolk Southern Railway, remained a user of RoadRailer until August 25, 2024. The RoadRailer trains were replaced temporarily with Trailer on Flat Car (TOFC) service, but have since fully transitioned to a standard double-stack container train. In 2026, a Triple Crown RoadRailer was preserved and put on display at the Southern Michigan Railroad Society in Michigan with plans to have a display about the RoadRailers inside the trailer. In September of 2026 another Triple Crown Roadrailer was put on display at the Tennessee Valley Railroad Museum.

== Users ==
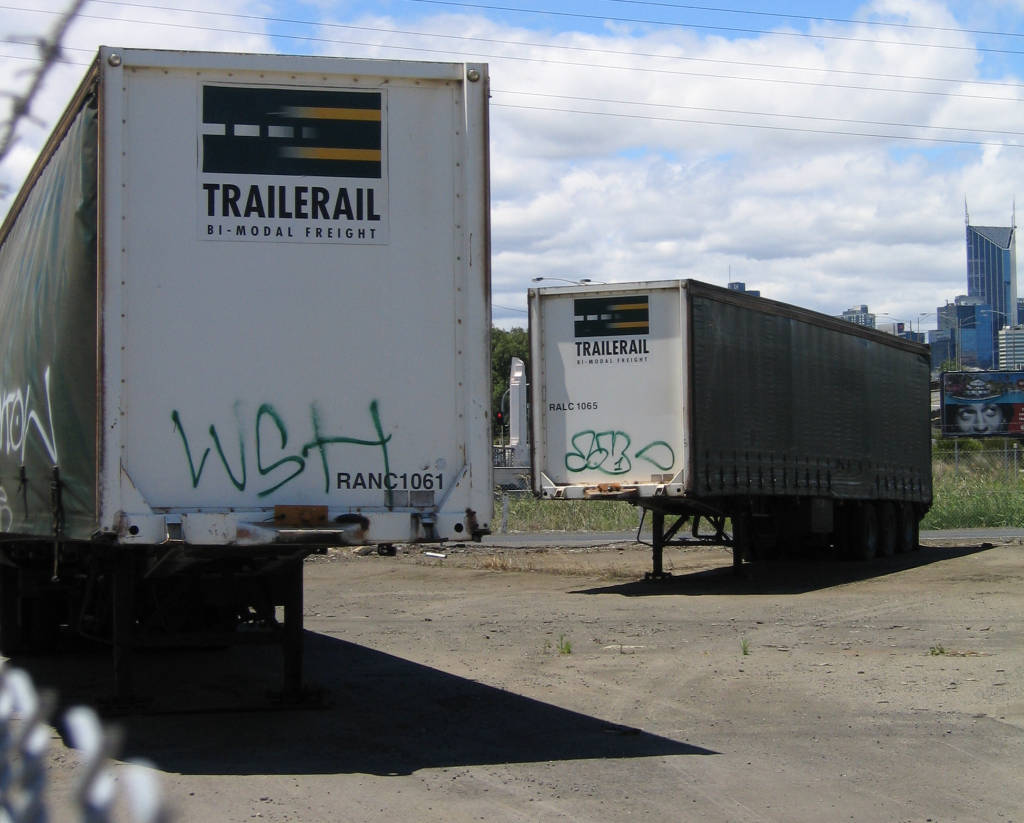
Australian National operated Roadrailers under the Trailerail brand

Roadrailers have been used in:

- United States - Norfolk Southern concluded service August 25, 2024.
- British Rail introduced RoadRailers on the East Coast Main Line between London, Newcastle and Edinburgh in 1964.
- Australian National commenced operating a trial RoadRailer service on the Adelaide to Alice Springs line in August 1990. However a permanent service did not begin until 1993 with the introduction of an Adelaide to Perth service in a joint venture with National Rail under the Trailerail brand. Contractual difficulties saw the service cease until resuming in November 1994. It was extended to Melbourne in November 1995.
- Austria
- Brazil
- Canada on Canadian National, previously run on Canadian Pacific.
- New Zealand tried their use experimentally, but ultimately discontinued them.
- Indian Railways introduced in October 2018 between Tamil Nadu and Palwal.

== See also ==
- Containerization
- Intermodal container
- Modalohr
- Nicky line – Where tests for a road-rail bus were carried out in the 1930s
- Piggyback (transportation)
- Road–rail vehicle
- Rolling highway

== Bibliography ==
- White, John H. (1985) [1978]. The American Railroad Passenger Car. Baltimore, Maryland: Johns Hopkins University Press. ISBN 978-0-8018-2743-3.
- Daniels, Rudolph (2000). Across the Continent: North American Railroad History. Indiana University Press, Bloomington, IN. ISBN 0-253-21411-4.
