= Clinton Township, Lenawee County, Michigan =

Clinton Township, Michigan
- Civil township
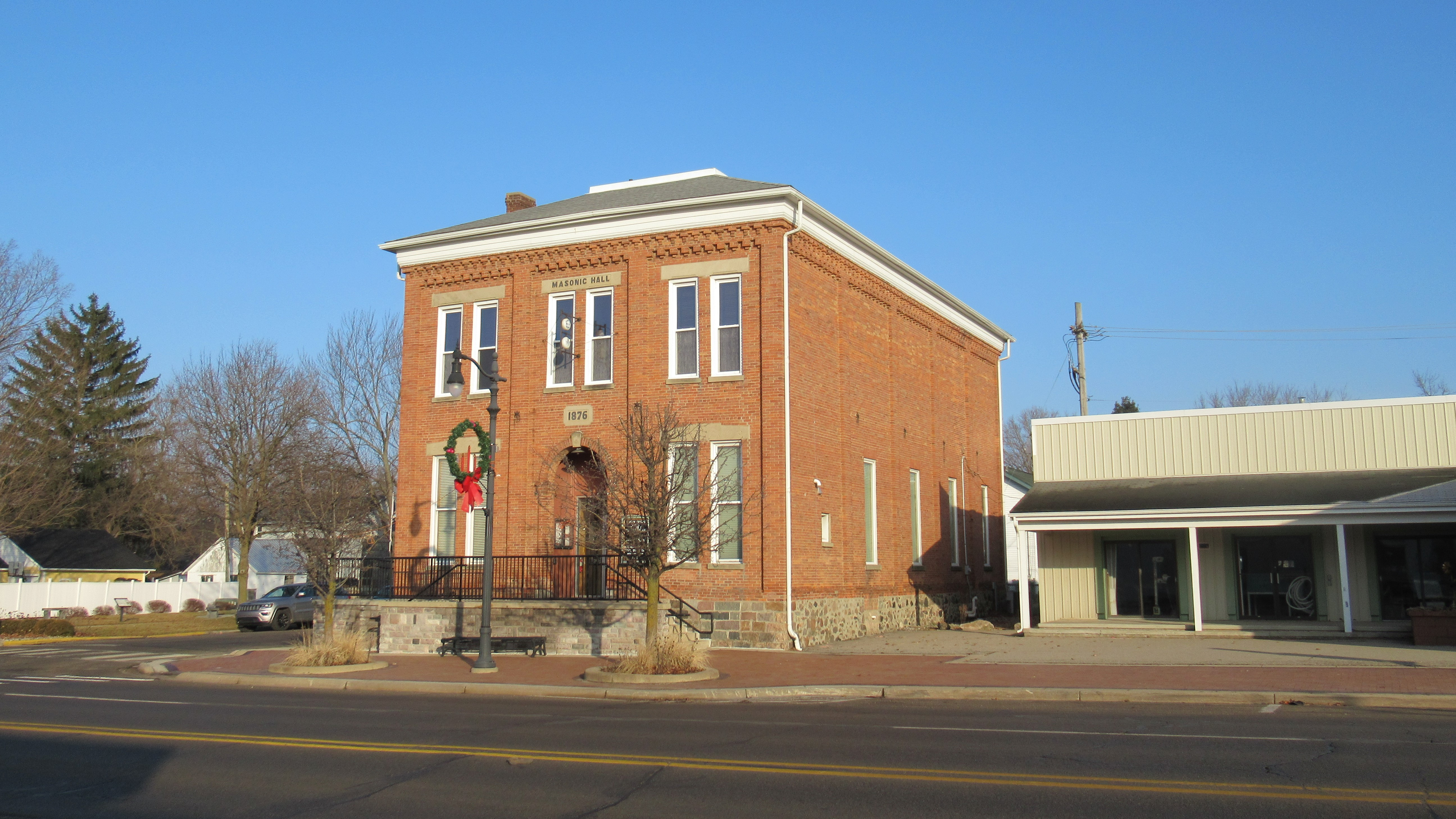
- Clinton Township Office along U.S. Route 12

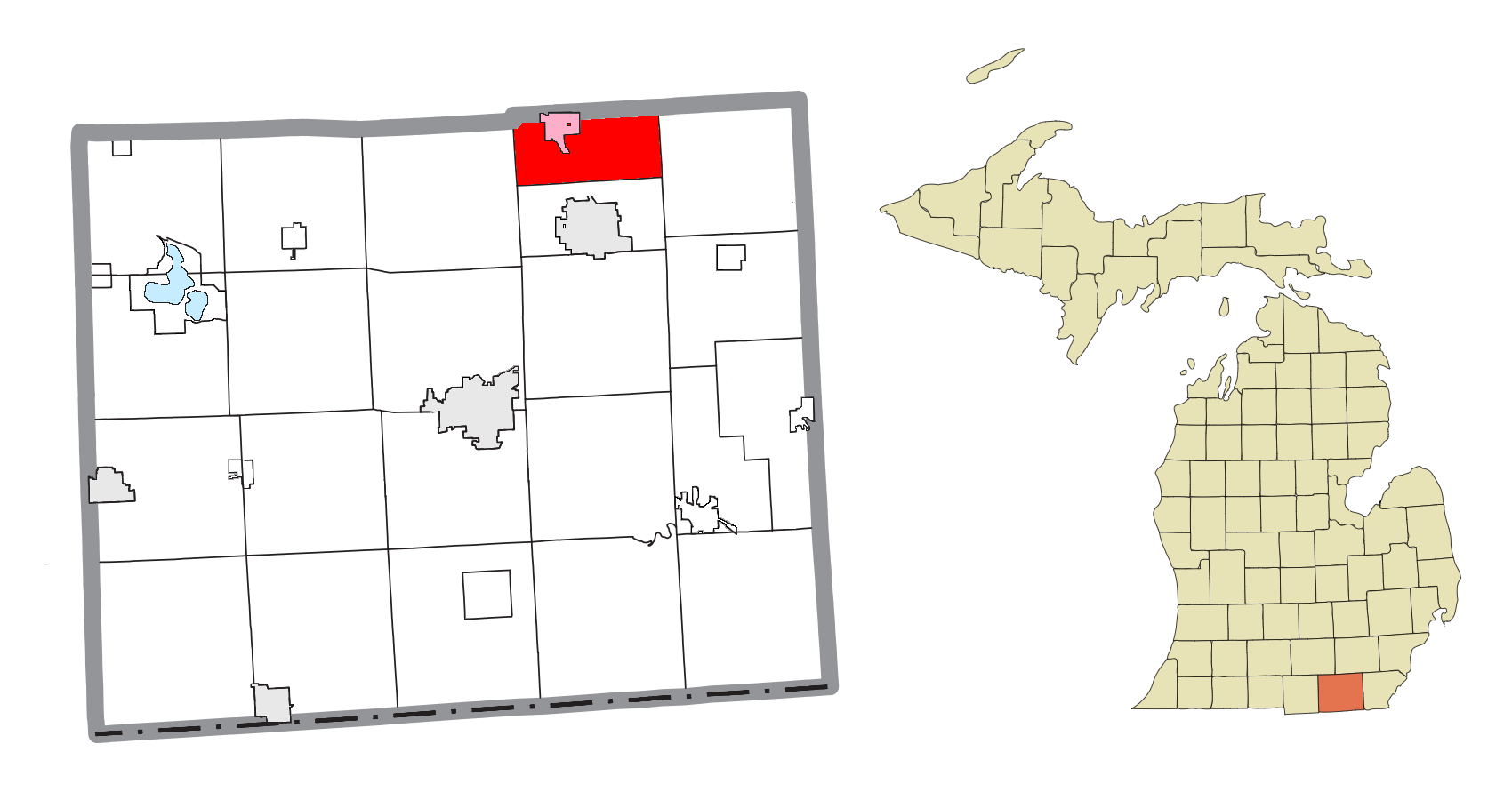
- Location within Lenawee County (red) and the administered village of Clinton (pink)

- Location within the state of Michigan Clinton Township (the United States)
- Coordinates: 42°03′37″N 83°56′49″W
- Country: United States
- State: Michigan
- County: Lenawee
- Established: 1869

Government
  - Supervisor: Walter Jamie Murphy
  - Clerk: Kim Scott

Area
  - Total: 18.1 sq mi (47.0 km^{2})
  - Land: 18.1 sq mi (46.8 km^{2})
  - Water: 0.077 sq mi (0.2 km^{2})
- Elevation: 876 ft (267 m)

Population (2020)
  - Total: 3,765
  - Density: 208/sq mi (80.4/km^{2})
- Time zone: UTC-5 (Eastern (EST))
  - Summer (DST): UTC-4 (EDT)
- ZIP code(s): 49236 (Clinton); 49286 (Tecumseh)
- Area code: 517
- FIPS code: 26-16520
- GNIS feature ID: 1626100
- Website: www.twpofclinton.com

Clinton Township is a civil township of Lenawee County in the U.S. state of Michigan. The population was 3,765 at the 2020 census. The village of Clinton is located within the township.

Both the village and township are named in honor of DeWitt Clinton, the governor of New York from 1817 to 1823.

== Geography ==
According to the United States Census Bureau, the township has a total area of 18.1 square miles (47 km^{2}), of which 18.1 square miles (47 km^{2}) is land and 0.1 square miles (0.26 km^{2}) (0.39%) is water.

== Demographics ==
At the 2000 census there were 3,624 people, 1,395 households, and 1,016 families in the township. The population density was 200.5 inhabitants per square mile (77.4/km^{2}). There were 1,448 housing units at an average density of 80.1 per square mile (30.9/km^{2}). The racial makeup of the township was 98.10% White, 0.19% African American, 0.30% Native American, 0.11% Asian, 0.33% from other races, and 0.97% from two or more races. Hispanic or Latino of any race were 1.60%.

Of the 1,395 households, 34.9% had children under the age of 18 living with them, 59.5% were married couples living together, 10.0% had a female householder with no husband present, and 27.1% were non-families. 23.3% of households were one person, and 8.7% were one person aged 65 or older. The average household size was 2.60 and the average family size was 3.05.

In the township the population was spread out, with 27.2% under the age of 18, 6.8% from 18 to 24, 30.0% from 25 to 44, 24.0% from 45 to 64, and 11.9% 65 or older. The median age was 37 years. For every 100 females, there were 94.2 males. For every 100 females age 18 and over, there were 92.0 males.

The median household income was $51,661 and the median family income was $55,968. Males had a median income of $46,602 versus $31,322 for females. The per capita income for the township was $21,554. About 4.2% of families and 6.1% of the population were below the poverty line, including 9.3% of those under age 18 and 4.3% of those age 65 or over.
