= List of Michigan State Historic Sites in Lenawee County =

Location of Lenawee County in Michigan

The following is a list of Michigan State Historic Sites in Lenawee County, Michigan. Sites marked with a dagger (†) are also listed on the National Register of Historic Places in Lenawee County, Michigan.

== Current listings ==
Name	Image	Location	City	Listing date
Adrian College Informational Designation		110 South Madison	Adrian	January 16, 1962
Adrian Fire Department / Engine House No. 1†		126 East Church Street	Adrian	August 21, 1989
Adrian Masonic Temple Building		160 East Maumee Street	Adrian	May 8, 1984
Adrian Public Library†		110 East Church Street	Adrian	December 14, 1976
Adrian Union Hall-Croswell Opera House†		129 East Maumee Street, between Broad and Main streets	Adrian	March 2, 1976
Al Meyers Airport Informational Designation		Macon Road and Tecumseh-Clinton Highway, NE of Tecumseh	Tecumseh vicinity	May 15, 1987
Elijah Anderson House		401 West Chicago Boulevard	Tecumseh	February 17, 1965
Bidwell Building		102 West Chicago Boulevard	Tecumseh	November 7, 1977
Hervey Bliss House		313 North Monroe Street	Blissfield	February 23, 1981
Blissfield Hotel		102 West Adrian Street	Blissfield	August 6, 1976
Cambridge Junction Historic State Park		US-12 and M-50 junction	Cambridge Junction	February 18, 1956
Camp Williams Commemorative Designation			Adrian	July 25, 2002
Enos Caniff House		121 Hill Street	Hudson	June 23, 1983
Will Carleton House		14995 Carleton Road	Hudson vicinity	February 11, 1972
David Carpenter House†		424 West Adrian Street	Blissfield	August 13, 1971
Joel Carpenter House		625 High Street	Blissfield	January 11, 1982
Chapel Hall – Adrian College		Downs Hall, South Madison Street	Adrian	April 24, 1981
Civil War Memorial†		Monument Park, bounded by Maumee, Park Place East, Park Place West, and Church streets	Adrian	August 13, 1971
Clayton Village District		Downtown Clayton	Clayton	July 26, 1974
Clearwater Beach Entrance Archway		Round Lake Highway and US-223	Manitou Beach vicinity	January 20, 1984
Site of the Clinton Inn / Clinton Informational Site		119 East Michigan Avenue (US-12)	Clinton	November 3, 1976
Clinton United Methodist Church		SE corner of Tecumseh and Church streets	Clinton	February 7, 1977
Clinton Woolen Manufacturing Company		303 West Michigan Avenue (US-12)	Clinton	April 24, 1979
Congregation of the First Baptist Church Informational Designation		119 North Broad Street	Adrian	July 29, 1980
Governor Charles Croswell House†		228 North Broad Street	Adrian	February 19, 1958
Davenport House		1280 US-12 (at Evans Lake), east of Walter J. Hayes State Park	Tipton vicinity	May 18, 1971
Dennis-State Street Historic District†		Bounded by Union Street on the north, railroad tracks on the south, State Street on the east, and Dennis Street on the west	Adrian	July 26, 1974
Dennis-State Street Historic District Boundary Increase (Bidwell Mansion)		204 East Church Street	Adrian	July 26, 1974
Hiram D. Ellis House		415 W Adrian Street	Blissfield	June 21, 1990
Erie and Kalamazoo Railroad Informational Designation		North Winter Street and West Maple Avenue	Adrian	February 18, 1956
Erie and Kalamazoo Railroad Informational Designation		424 West Adrian Street	Blissfield	February 15, 1984
Erie and Kalamazoo Rail Road / Rail Road Informational Designation		Beagle Street	Blissfield	2001
Musgrove Evans House†		409-411 E Logan Street, NE corner of Maumee Street	Tecumseh	October 29, 1971
First Presbyterian Church of Blissfield†		306 Franklin Street, NW corner of Maple Street	Blissfield	June 11, 1965
Fractional District No. 3 School		Lime Creek Highway (M-156) and West Ridgeville Road	Seneca Township	2005
Dr. Leonard Hall House†		334 West Main Street	Hudson	April 4, 1978
Hudson Downtown Historic District†		West Main Street between Howard and Market streets, and Church Street between Seward and Railroad streets	Hudson	January 21, 1974
Irish Hills Towers†		8433 West US-12	Cambridge Township	February 12, 1959
La Plaisance Bay Pike Informational Designation		Tecumseh Community Center on M-50, near the Monroe Co. line (US-23)	Tecumseh	May 12, 1965
Lake Shore and Michigan Southern Railway and Bridge		Bean Creek - North of Main Street	Hudson	January 20, 1984
Lenawee County Courthouse†		301 North Main Street	Adrian	November 14, 1974
Lenawee County Fairgrounds		602 Dean St	Adrian	November 15, 2001
Medina Baptist Church		12650 Medina Road	Hudson	May 8, 1986
Oakwood Cemetery		101 Oakwood	Adrian	December 3, 1998
Palmyra Presbyterian Church		6370 Palmyra Road, NE corner of Rouget Road	Palmyra	November 26, 1985
Jira Payne-John Smith House		211 Tecumseh	Clinton	March 15, 1988
John Pennington-Henry Ford House†		8281 Clinton Macon Road	Macon	September 17, 1974
Raisin Valley Friends Meetinghouse†		3552 North Adrian Highway	Adrian	January 23, 1992
Riverside Mortuary Chapel / Wirt Rowland		Riverside Cemetery; 208 Coman Street	Clinton	2005
Sydney A. Rathbun House (Fairlane Farm)		9426 Morse Highway	Jasper	October 12, 1990
Sacred Heart Hall		1247 E. Siena Heights Drive	Adrian	December 20, 1989
Saint Alphonsus Catholic Church		222 Carey Street	Deerfield	March 15, 1990
Saint Dominic Catholic Church and Cemetery		220 Brown Street	Clinton	May 30, 1996
Saint Elizabeth's Church†		302 East Chicago Boulevard	Tecumseh	May 8, 1986
Saint John's Episcopal Church		122 East Church Street	Clinton	January 8, 1981
Saint John's Lutheran Church†		121 South Locust Street, NE corner of Church Street	Adrian	February 23, 1981
Saint Joseph Hospital and Home for the Aged Informational Designation		1269 Siena Heights Drive	Adrian	June 15, 1984
Saint Joseph's Church and Shrine†		8743 US-12	Brooklyn	April 19, 1990
Saint Joseph's Roman Catholic Church		415-419 Ormsby Street	Adrian	June 15, 1979
Saint Joseph's School and Rectory		415-419 Ormsby Street	Adrian	February 15, 1990
Saint Michael and All Angels Church		Old Monroe Pike Road (corner of US-12 and M-50)	Cambridge Junction	October 2, 1980
Saint Peter's Episcopal Church		313 North Evans Street	Tecumseh	February 19, 1958
Second Baptist Church		607 Broad St	Adrian	February 19, 1987
Sutton House		3901 Sutton Road	Adrian	February 11, 1972
Tecumseh Downtown Historic District†		East and West Chicago Boulevard, and South Evans Street	Tecumseh	January 16, 1976
Gamaliel Thompson House†		101 Summit Street	Hudson	February 22, 1974
Dr. Nathan Town House		3951 Woerner Road	Addison vicinity	January 3, 1982
Murray D. Van Wagoner Memorial Bridge† / Taft Memorial Highway		M-156 at Silver Creek	Morenci	2004
Walker Tavern†		Junction of US-12 and M-50	Cambridge Junction	February 19, 1958
Nathaniel S. Wheeler House†		7075 M-50, North of Onsted	Onsted	July 26, 1974
Wooden Stone School		NE corner of Stephenson Road and Hawkins Highway	Onsted	June 15, 1979
Woodstock Manual Labor Institute Informational Site		18123 Greenleaf Road	Addison vicinity	November 14, 1969
Woodstock Township District No. 2 School		11426 US-12	Woodstock Township	March 15, 1990

== See also ==
- National Register of Historic Places listings in Lenawee County, Michigan

== Sources ==
- Historic Sites Online – Lenawee County. Michigan State Housing Developmental Authority. Accessed March 30, 2011.
