= State Street Historic District =

State Street Historic District may refer to the following districts on the National Register of Historic Places:

- Dennis-State Streets Historic District, listed on the NRHP in Adrian, Michigan
- State Street Historic District (Boise, Idaho), listed on the National Register of Historic Places (NRHP) in Idaho
- State Street Historic District (North Vernon, Indiana), listed on the NRHP in Indiana
- State Street Historic District (Carthage, New York), listed on the NRHP in Jefferson County, New York
- State Street Historic District (Rochester, New York), listed on the NRHP in New York
