= State Street =

State Street may refer to:

== Streets and locations ==
- State Street (Santa Barbara), California
- State Street (Chicago), Illinois
- State Street (Portland, Maine)
- State Street (Boston), Massachusetts
- State Street (Albany), New York
- State Street (Manhattan), New York
- House at No. 8 State Street, Mount Morris in Livingston County, New York
- State Street Historic District (Rochester, New York)
- State Street (Salt Lake County), Utah
- State Street (Madison), Wisconsin

== Financial organizations ==
- State Street Corporation, a financial services holding company; the parent primarily focuses on servicing institutional investment clients
  - State Street Bank and Trust Company, a subsidiary
  - State Street Investment Management, the investment management division of State Street Corporation

== See also ==
- State Street Bank v. Signature Financial Group, a US court decision relating to a business method patent
- State Street station (disambiguation)
