= St. Michael and All Angels Episcopal Church =

St. Michael and All Angels Episcopal Church may refer to:

- St. Michael and All Angels Episcopal Church (Anniston, Alabama)
- St. Michael and All Angels Episcopal Church (Cincinnati, OH)
- Saint Michael and All Angels Episcopal Church, Lenawee County, Michigan
