= Bank of Pennsylvania =

The Bank of Pennsylvania or the Pennsylvania Bank can refer to two institutions: one that existed during the American Revolutionary War, and another chartered by the state in 1793.

== Revolutionary bank ==
The first Bank of Pennsylvania was organized on July 17, 1780 at the suggestion of Thomas Paine to fund provisions for the Continental Army. Citizens were urged to pledge state and continental money to the bank, and a total of £315,000 in depreciated money was raised. The organizers then proposed to Congress to supply the army with these funds, if Congress would reimburse them with interest. Congress agreed and posted security in the form of bills drawn on its foreign envoys. Robert Morris and Alexander Hamilton would later observe that this was not properly a bank, since it did not lend, but rather a purchasing agency on behalf of the government. It nonetheless provided critical support for the army following the disastrous Siege of Charleston. The bank continued purchases for a year and a half, ultimately giving way to the Bank of North America, and was wound down after the war in 1784.

== Chartered bank ==
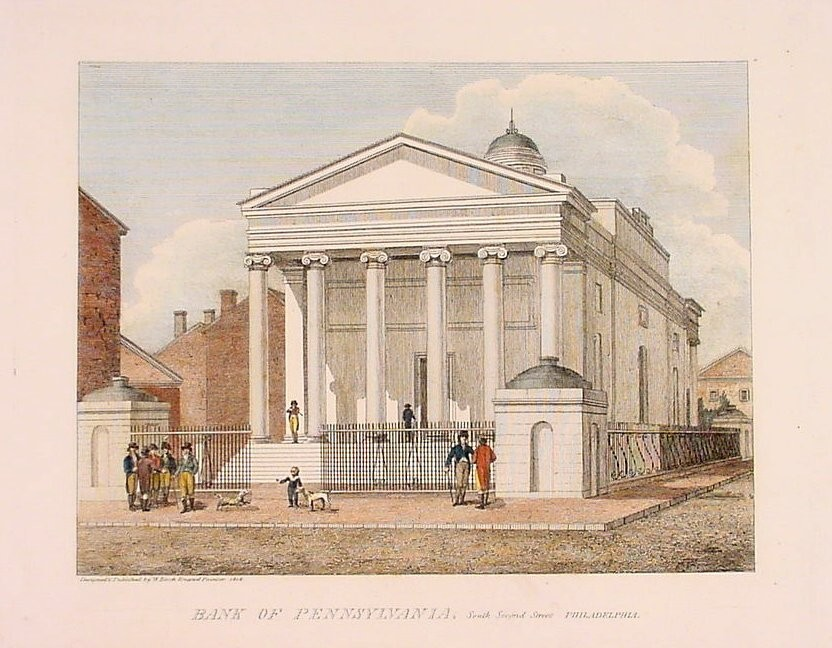
Bank of Pennsylvania building designed by Benjamin Henry Latrobe. Engraving by William Birch.

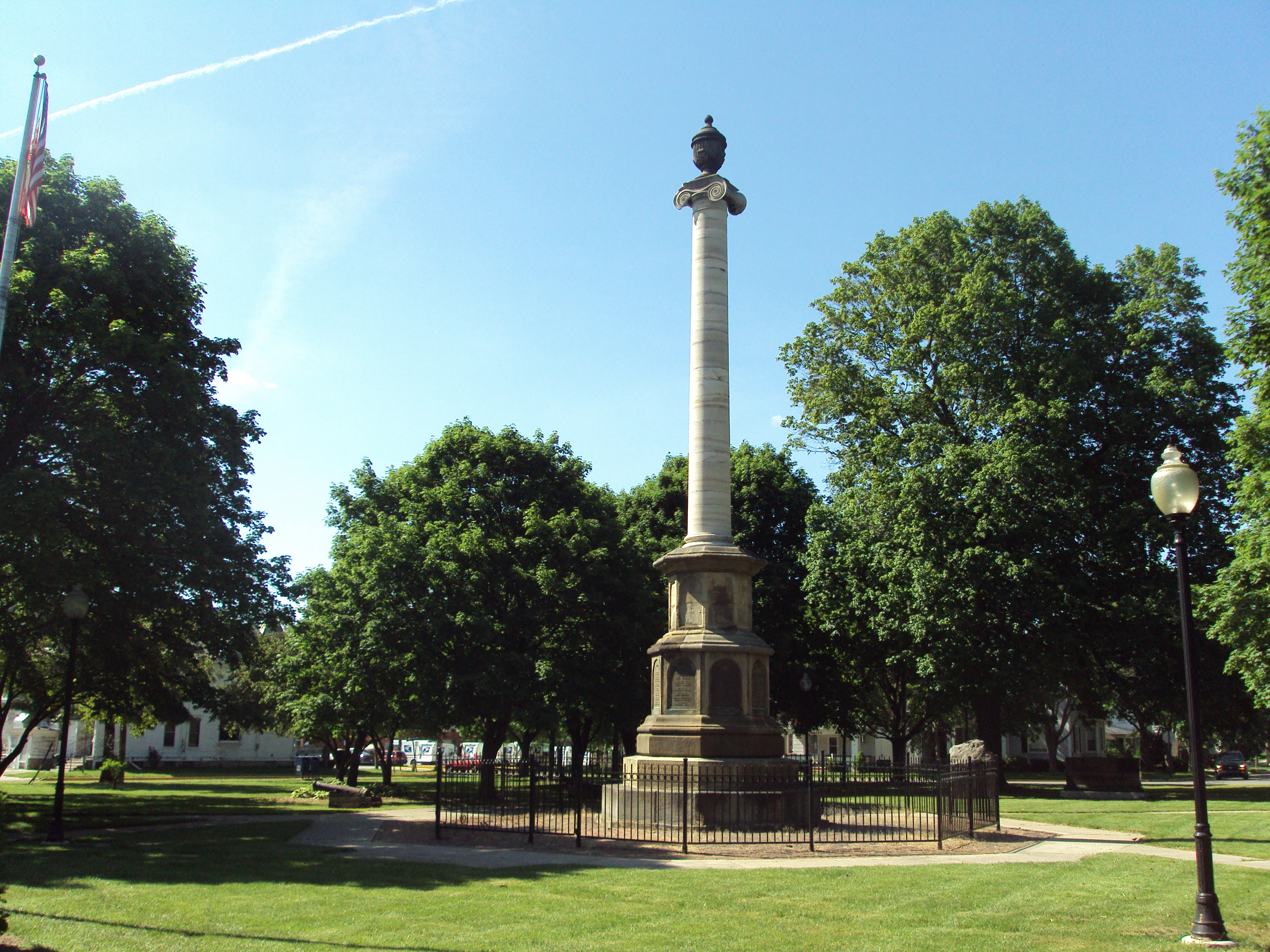
Civil War memorial, Adrian, Michigan

In 1793, the Bank of Pennsylvania was established with a charter from the Commonwealth of Pennsylvania, and branches were opened in Pittsburgh, Harrisburg, Lancaster, Reading, and Easton. The bank collapsed in September 1857, with Thomas Allibone of the family firm Thomas Allibone & Co. serving as its president.

In 1870, the only remaining piece of the bank headquarters building—one of its iconic stone columns—was moved to Adrian, Michigan, where it was erected as a Civil War Memorial in commemoration of the 84 local soldiers who died in the American Civil War. Another column is extant as a Civil War monument in Wilmington, Delaware.

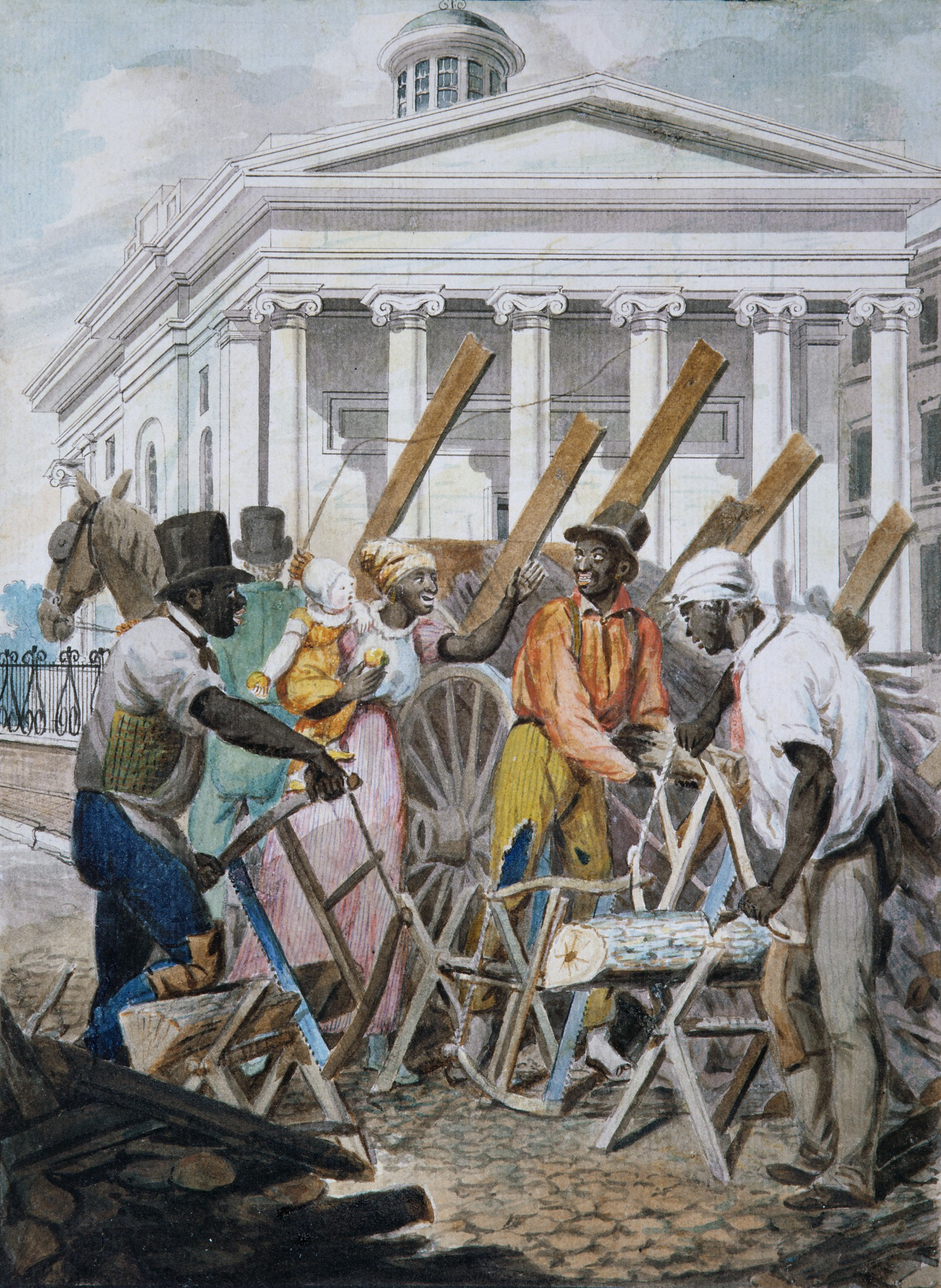
John Lewis Krimmel, Black Sawyers Working in front of the Bank of Pennsylvania (ca.1813)
