= Civil War Memorial (Adrian, Michigan) =

- U.S. National Register of Historic Places
- Michigan State Historic Site
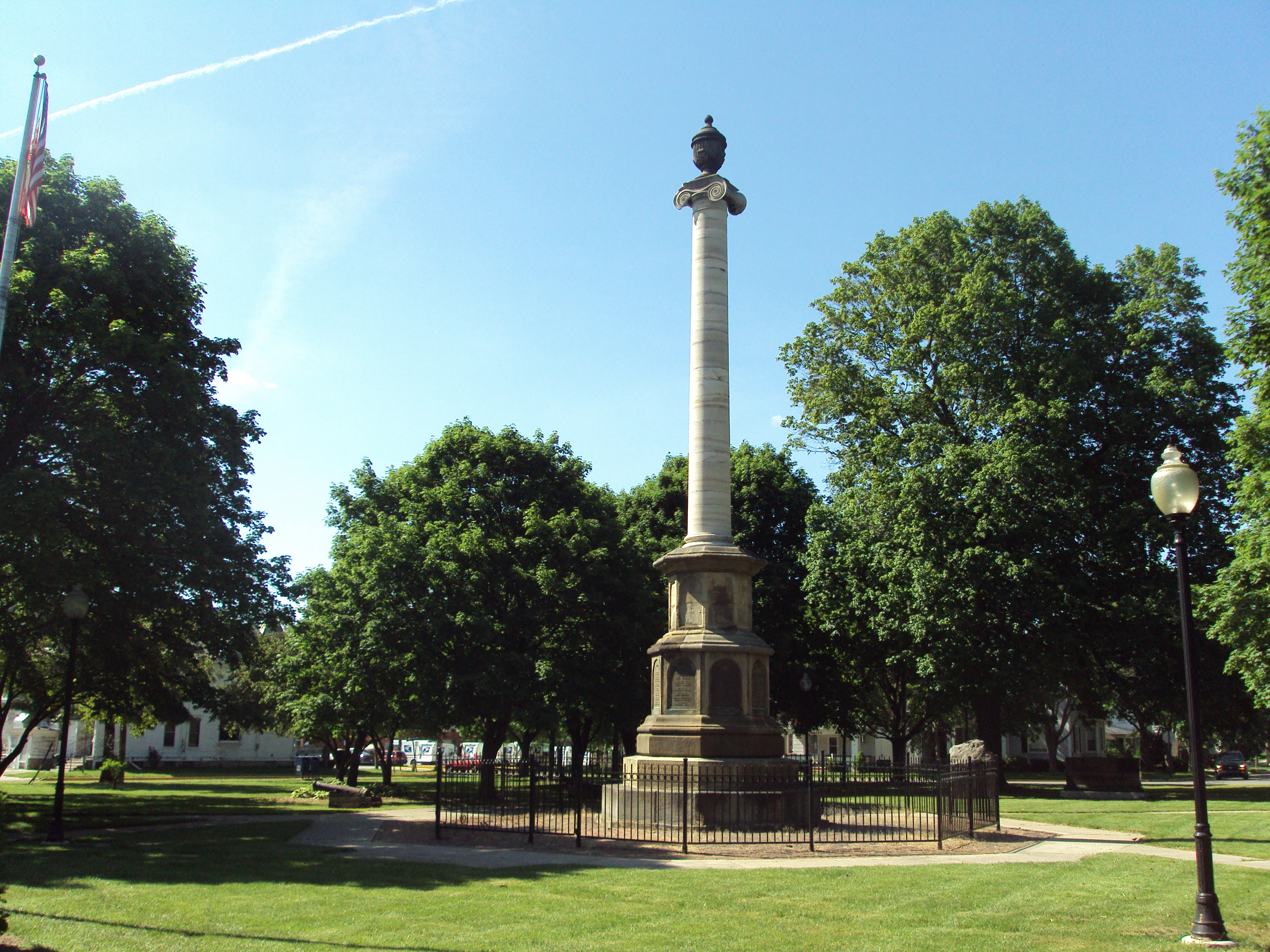

- Location within Michigan Location within the United States
- Interactive map
- Location: Monument Park; Adrian, Michigan
- Coordinates: 41°53′47″N 84°01′45″W
- Built: July 4, 1870
- Architect: Benjamin Latrobe
- NRHP reference No.: 72000632

Significant dates
- Added to NRHP: June 29, 1972
- Designated MSHS: August 13, 1971

The Civil War Memorial is a marble monument situated in the center of Monument Park in Adrian, Michigan. The monument was designated as a Michigan Historic Site on August 13, 1971, and later added to the National Register of Historic Places on June 29, 1972. It was unveiled on July 4, 1870, to commemorate soldiers from Adrian who died in the American Civil War (1861–1865).

== History ==
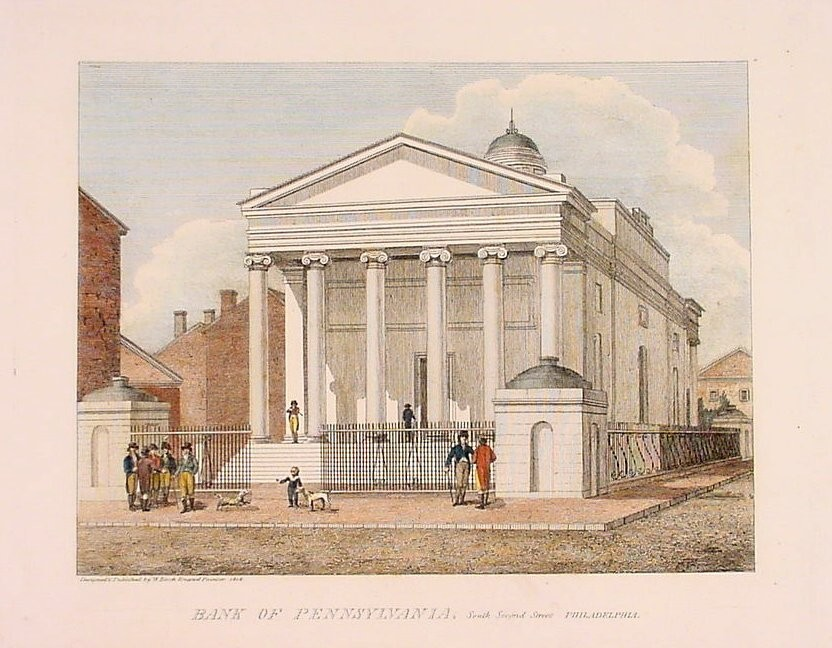
The column once belonged to the former Bank of Pennsylvania building in Philadelphia.

The Civil War Memorial ties together the cities of Adrian and Philadelphia, Pennsylvania. The column used in the monument was originally one of the six marble columns on the eastern facade of the former Bank of Pennsylvania building in Philadelphia. The bank building and the column itself were built in 1799.

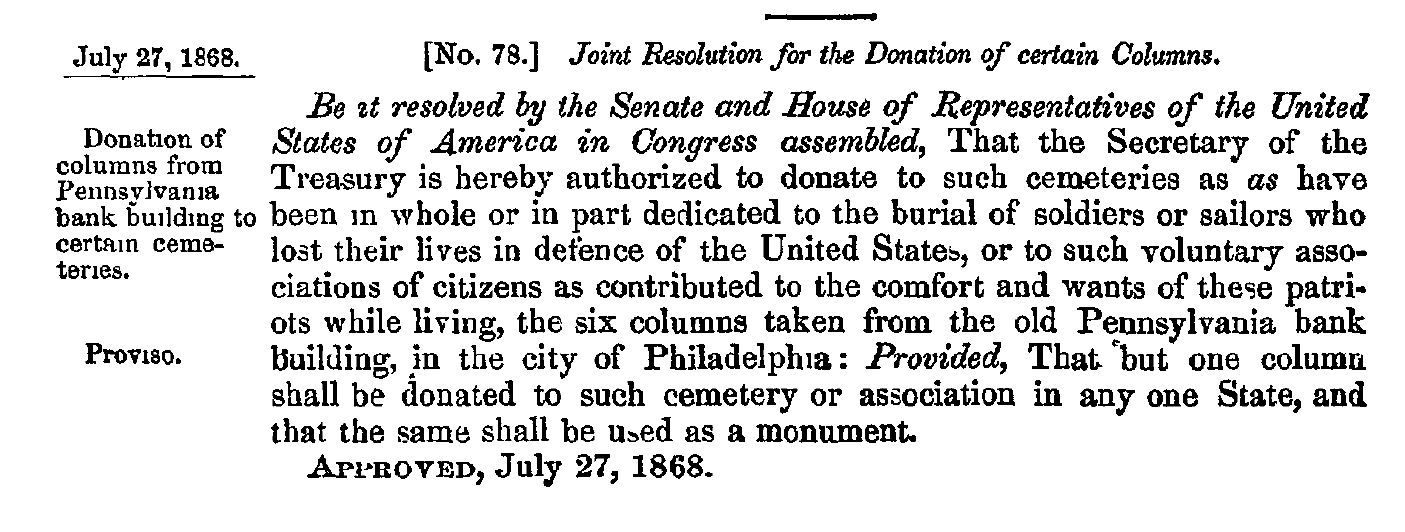
Congressional resolution donating column for use in a memorial

The Bank of Pennsylvania building, which was considered one of the first examples of Greek Revival architecture in the United States, was demolished in 1867. With Congressional permission, Joint resolution N0-78, July 27, 1868, one of the six columns was acquired by The Hon. F.C. Beaman, member of Congress and former Mayor of the city and J. Fred Myers Esq. of Washington, a former well known citizen of Adrian and was donated to the monument association by Hon. Hugh McCulloch, then Secretary of the Treasury of the United States after its destruction. It remains one of the only surviving piece of the original Bank of Pennsylvania building in Michigan. Wilmington, Delaware, has another column.

== Design ==
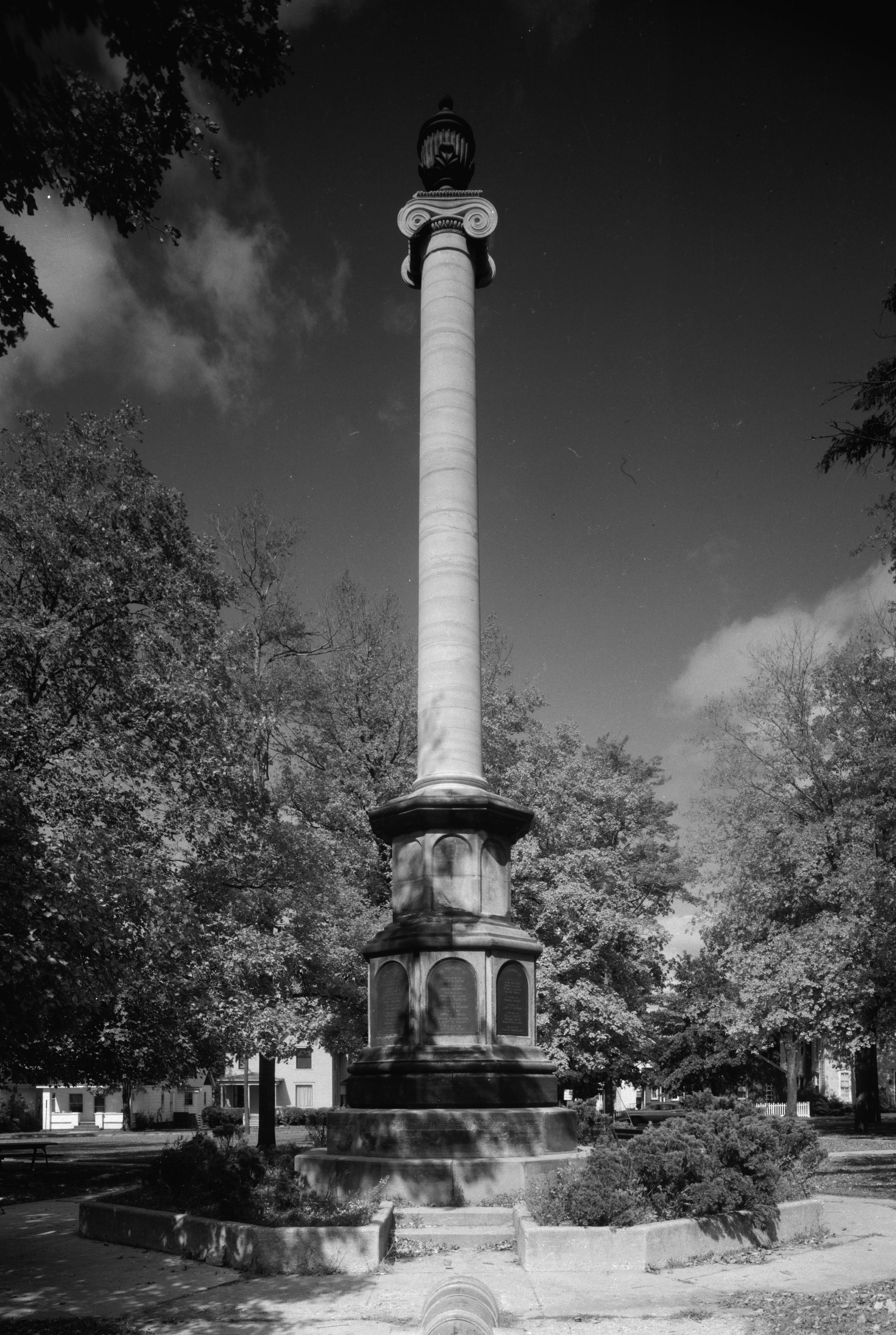
Adrian Civil War Memorial, 1962 HABS—Historic American Buildings Survey image.

Architect and sculptor Benjamin H. Latrobe created the design of the column for the Pennsylvania Bank. The monument architect was Francis R. Stebbins of Adrian Michigan. The column was donated to the association by a joint act of Congress, (No-78) dated July 27, 1868. The sandstone base and urn at the top came to a cost of $10,000 raised by the monument association. The monument was unveiled in Monument Park on July 4, 1870, by the Adrian Soldiers’ Monument Association. It was the second such commemorative monument erected in Lenawee County following the war — the first being a cemetery monument erected in nearby Franklin Township.

The column rests on top of a sandstone octagonal pedestal, and each side contains a bronze tablet inscribed with the names of 84 fallen soldiers and the regiment to which they belonged. The column itself is surmounted with a sandstone urn.

The inscription on the base of the pedestal reads:

"1870. Erected by citizens of Adrian in memory of our fallen soldiers. By such as these was our Union saved in the great struggle of 1861–1865."

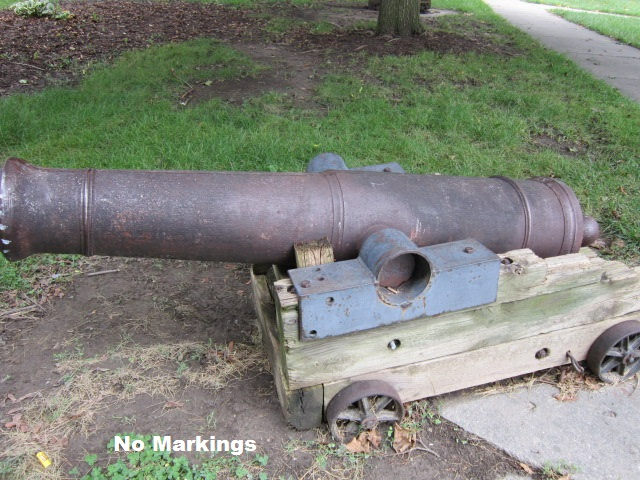
Cannons

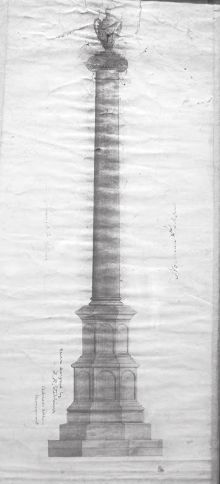
Drawing by F.R. Stebbins of the base and acorn for the granite column of the memorial.

== Cannons ==
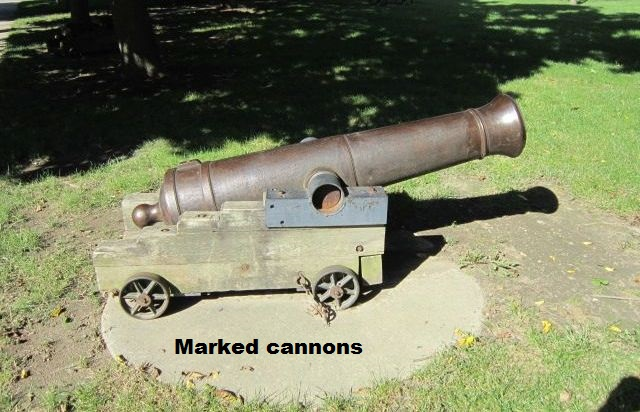
One of two marked cannons

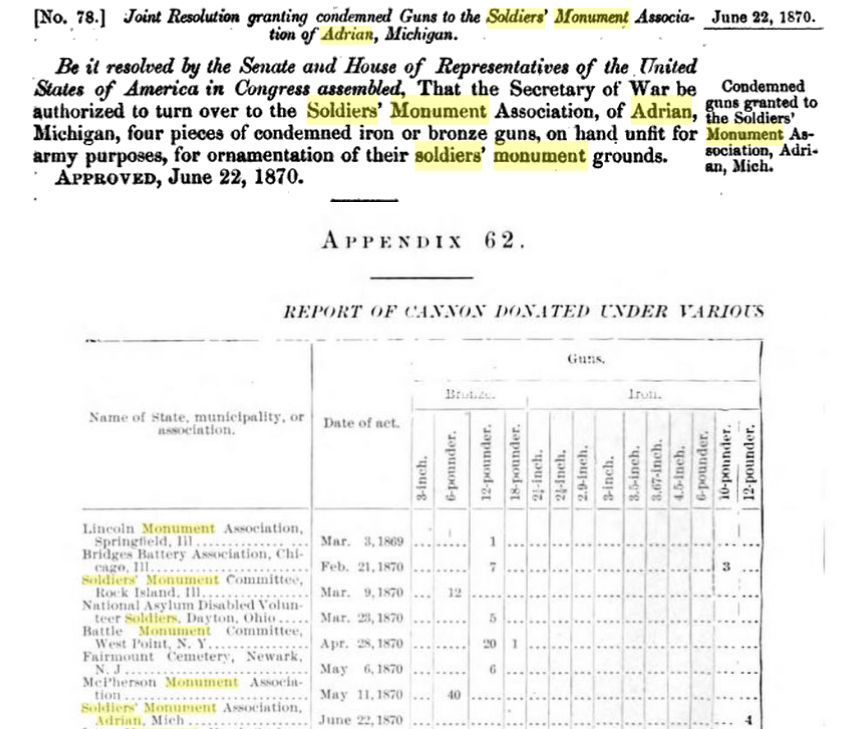
Congressional authorization of cannon to Adrian memorial

There are four cannons that complement the Civil War Monument. Two of them are not marked by the foundry where they were made that we can find to date. The other two are marked and well documented. They were cast in 1834 at the Columbia Foundry located in Georgetown just north of DC. The foundry was started by Henry Foxall in Philadelphia but when the seat of government in 1800 moved to DC he also moved the foundry and continued to cast guns for the government. In 1815 the foundry was sold to Gen. John Mason. The cannons are marked with the US on the top. The weight is at the back of the breech. The initials WJW are on the top face of the cannon. WJW indicates the inspector of the cannons and that was Col. William Jenkins Worth. He was the inspector for all the foundries in the DC area at that time. At the bottom of the cannons face are marked #2 and the other is #3. These were experimental cannons and only three were cast. No one knows where cannon #1 is. The cannons were donated to the Monument association of Adrian by an act of Congress, Resolution (No-78) June 22, 1870, with the aid of The Hon. F.C. Beeaman, member of Congress and former Mayor of the city and J. Fred Myers Esq. of Washington and Henry Hart Association president.
