= State Street station =

State Street station could refer to:

- New Haven State Street station in New Haven, Connecticut
- State station in Boston, Massachusetts
- State Street station (Atlantic Avenue Elevated), a former elevated station in Boston, Massachusetts
- State Street station (Illinois) in Chicago, Illinois
  - State/Lake station in the Chicago Loop
