= John Pennington–Henry Ford House =

Historic house in Michigan, United States

- U.S. National Register of Historic Places
- Michigan State Historic Site
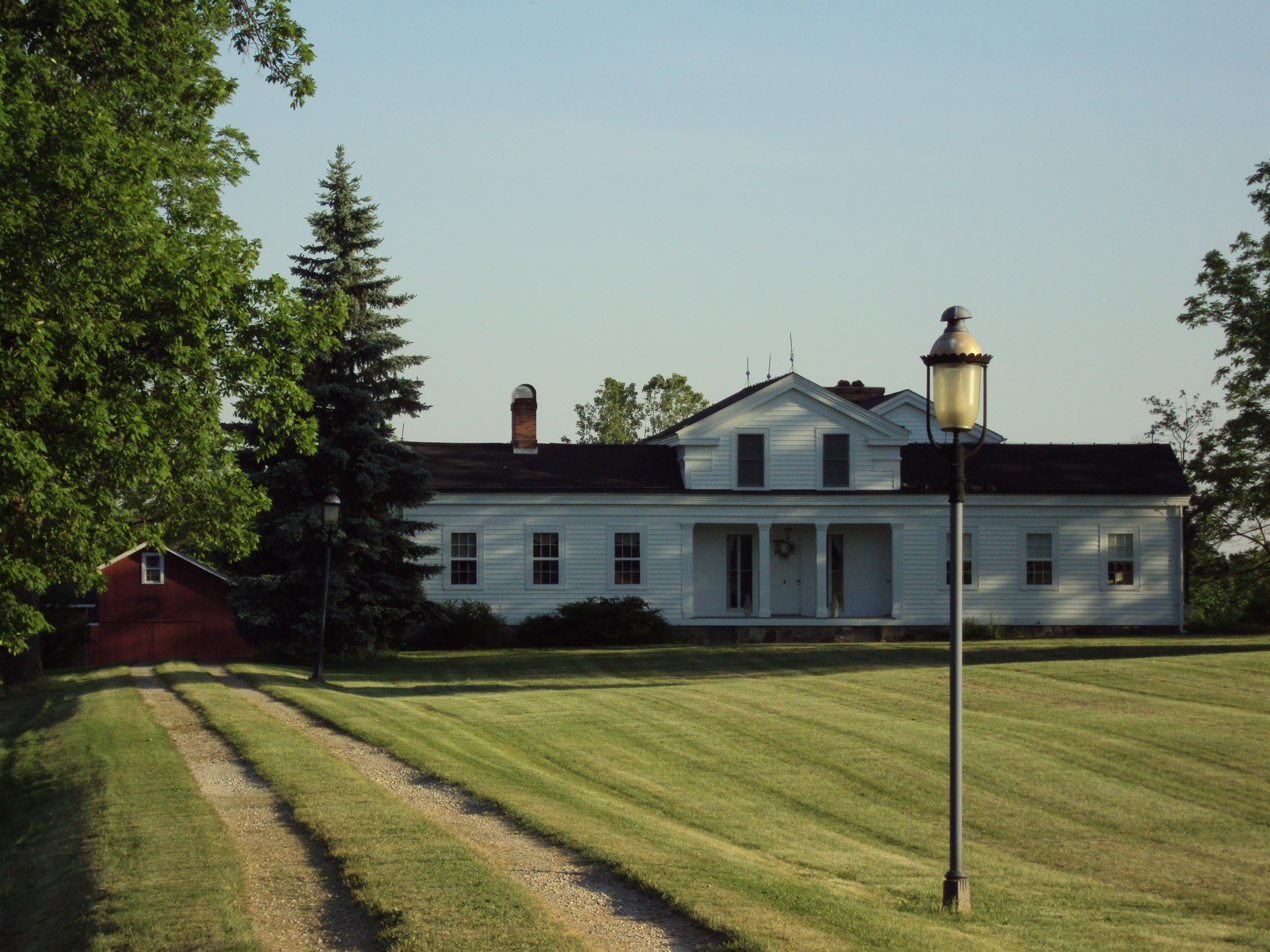

- Location within Michigan Location within the United States
- Interactive map
- Location: 8281 Clinton Macon Road; Macon, Michigan
- Coordinates: 42°03′58″N 83°52′04″W
- Built: c. 1845
- Architect: John and Hannah Pennington
- Architectural style: Greek Revival
- NRHP reference No.: 74000993

Significant dates
- Added to NRHP: December 31, 1974
- Designated MSHS: September 17, 1974

The John Pennington–Henry Ford House, also known as the John Banks House, is a private residence located at 8281 Clinton Macon Road in Macon Township in the northeast corner of Lenawee County, Michigan. It was designated as a Michigan Historic Site on September 17, 1974, and later added to the National Register of Historic Places on December 31, 1974.

== History ==
In 1829, John and Hannah Pennington moved from Perinton, New York to this location in Michigan. At the time, the Penningtons were the only settlers between Tecumseh and Saline. They built a shanty and began clearing the land. That fall they built a log cabin. More settlers soon arrived, and a small settlement sprang up.

Some time around 1845, the Penningtons built this house. They continued to live here until John's death in 1883 and Hannah's soon after. At that time, John M. Pennington, the couple's son, moved into the house. John M. Pennington died in 1929, and the house has soon purchased by automotive magnate Henry Ford, who purchased and restored the property in the 1930s. He used the surrounding farmland to conduct experiments on soybeans. Ford later sold the property, and it remains privately owned.

== Description ==
The house is a symmetric two-story Greek Revival farmhouse with a recessed, pillared porch on the ground level. Single-story wings extend to each side of the main section. The house is sided with narrow boards, and sits on a fieldstone foundation.

The interior of the house contains a pantry and three bedrooms on the ground floor, and one large bedroom on the second floor. Bathrooms were added at a later date. The interior has oak floors and black walnut woodwork.
