= Nathaniel S. Wheeler House =

Historic house in Michigan, United States

- U.S. National Register of Historic Places
- Michigan State Historic Site
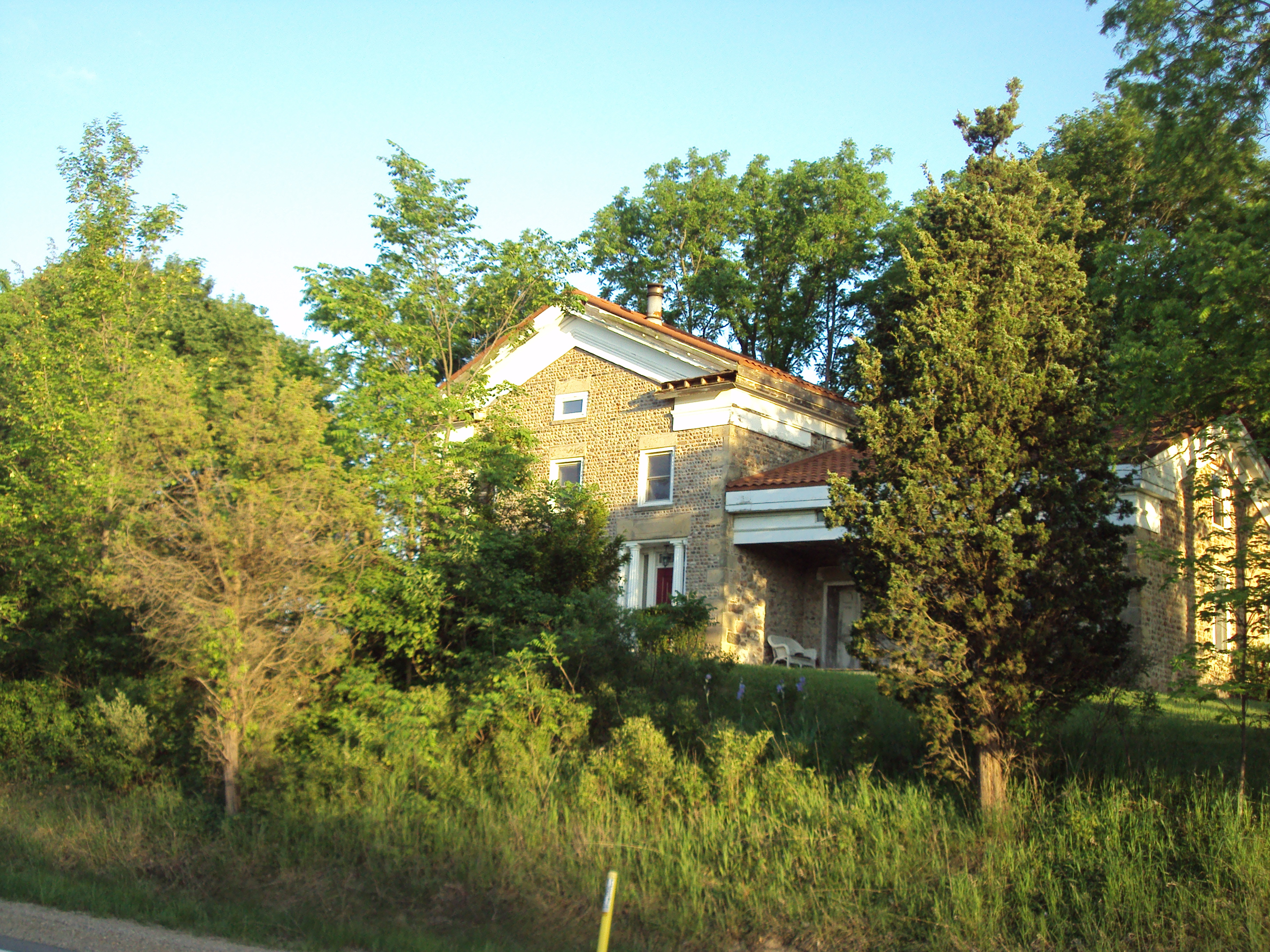

- Location within Michigan Location within the United States
- Interactive map
- Location: 7075 W. Monroe Street; Cambridge Township, Michigan
- Coordinates: 42°01′26″N 84°07′55″W
- Built: c. 1845
- Architect: Nathaniel Wheeler
- Architectural style: Greek Revival
- NRHP reference No.: 75000953

Significant dates
- Added to NRHP: February 24, 1975
- Designated MSHS: July 26, 1974

The Nathaniel S. Wheeler House is a private residence located at 7075 M-50 (known locally as West Monroe Street) just north of the village of Onsted in rural Cambridge Township in Lenawee County, Michigan. It was designated as a Michigan Historic Site on July 26, 1974, and later added to the National Register of Historic Places on February 24, 1975.

== History ==
Nathaniel Wheeler was born in Amenia, New York in 1808. In 1833, he moved to Michigan with his parents and settled on this land, one of the township's first settlers. It is uncertain when this house was built, but it was approximately 1845. Wheeler married Nancy A. Russ in 1855; the couple had four children. Wheeler and his family sold the farm in 1869 and resettled elsewhere in the county.

The house has since gone through a series of owners. These include Alba Chase, who owned the farm from 1893 to 1921. Chase's daughter Ethel May married Clare Dowling, who owned the house and land until 1972. The house passed through a number of owners in the 1970s, and was restored. It remains privately owned.

== Description ==
The house is a cobblestone 2 1/2-story Greek Revival structure with a perpendicular 1 1/2-story wing. It has both a front and rear porch. The walls are 16" thick and constructed to neatly coursed multi-colored cobblestones. Stone quoins are at the corners, and it sits on a rubble foundation with a limestone water table. The gables are wooden with cornice returns. There are sixteen double-hing windows with stone lintels and sills. The front door is framed by fluted pilasters and topped with a transom window. Doric columns surround the door.

The house was once attached to a much larger 500-acre (202 ha) farm.
