= Macon Township, Michigan =

- Civil Township
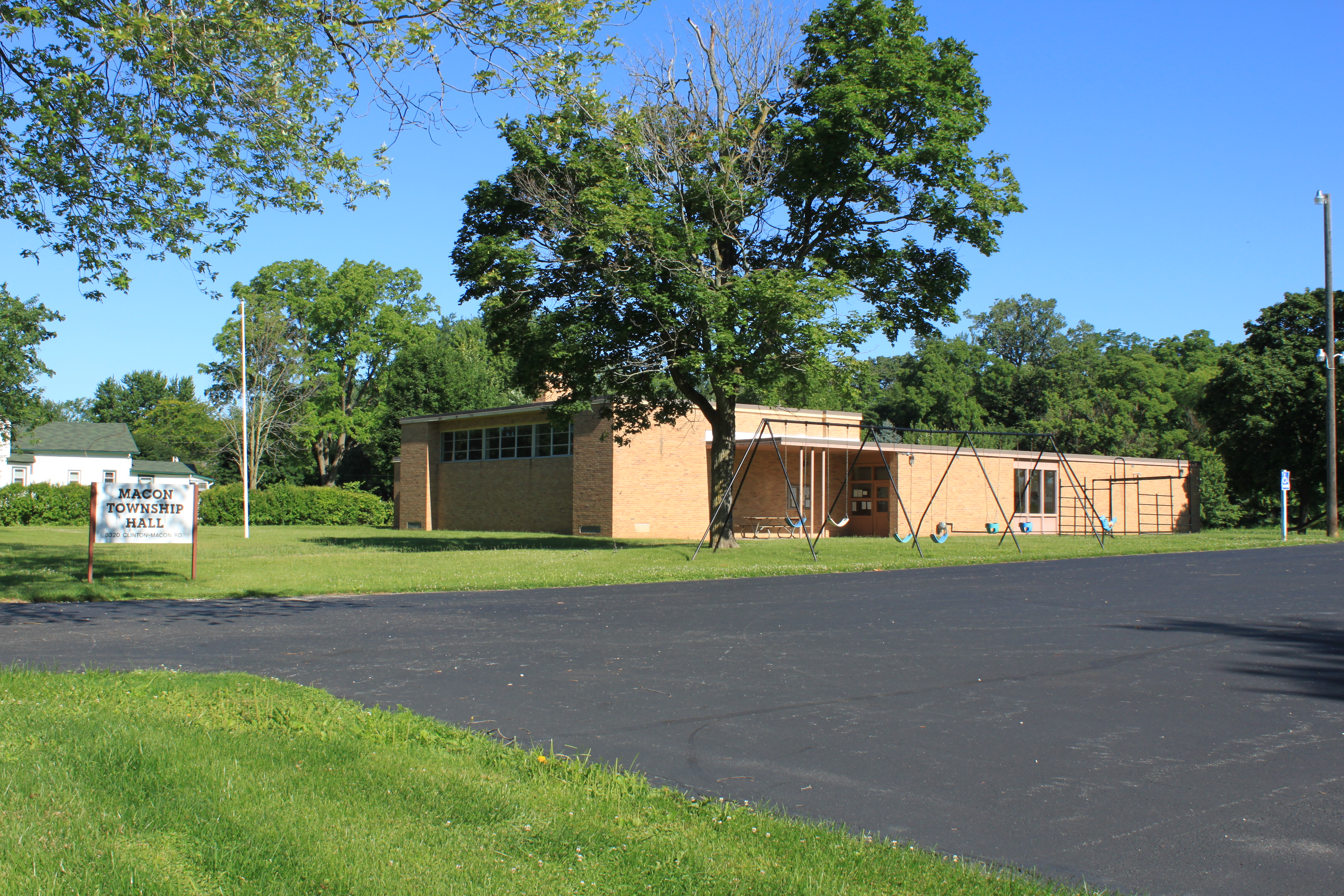
- Macon Township Hall

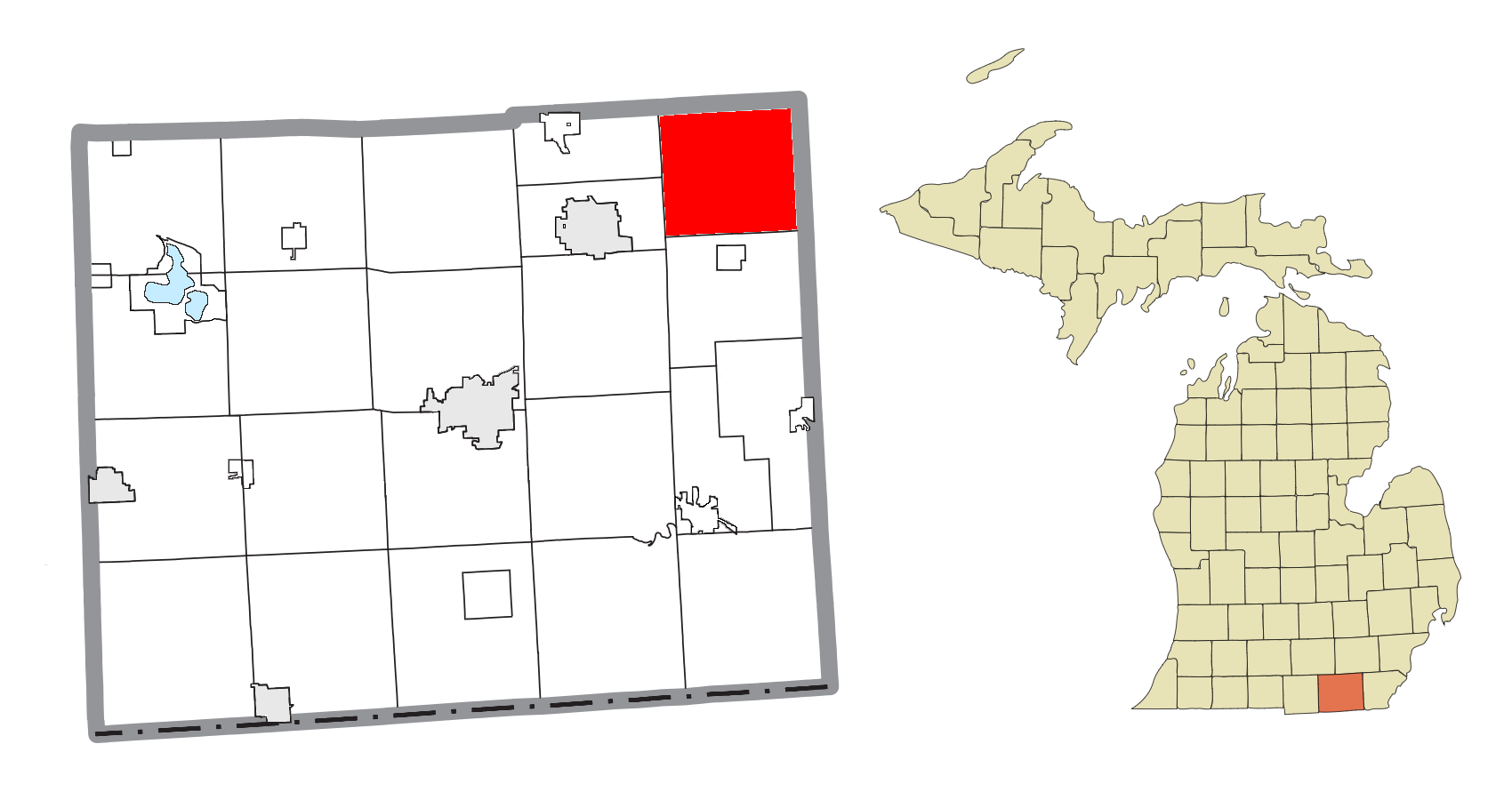
- Location within Lenawee County
- Interactive map of Macon Township, Michigan
- Location within the state of Michigan Macon Township (the United States)
- Coordinates: 42°02′38″N 83°49′48″W
- Country: United States
- State: Michigan
- County: Lenawee
- Established: 1834

Government
  - Supervisor: Dean Montrief
  - Clerk: Julia Dejonghe

Area
  - Total: 32.6 sq mi (84.5 km^{2})
  - Land: 32.6 sq mi (84.5 km^{2})
  - Water: 0 sq mi (0.0 km^{2})
- Elevation: 735 ft (224 m)

Population (2020)
  - Total: 1,330
  - Density: 40.8/sq mi (15.7/km^{2})
- Time zone: UTC-5 (Eastern (EST))
  - Summer (DST): UTC-4 (EDT)
- ZIP code(s): 49229 (Britton); 49236 (Clinton); 49286 (Tecumseh)
- Area code: 517
- FIPS code: 26-50520
- GNIS feature ID: 1626661
- Website: www.macontwp.com

Macon Township is a civil township of Lenawee County in the U.S. state of Michigan. As of the 2020 census, the township population was 1,330.

== Geography ==
According to the United States Census Bureau, the township has a total area of 32.6 square miles (84 km^{2}), all land.

== Demographics ==
As of the census of 2000, there were 1,448 people, 502 households, and 415 families residing in the township. The population density was 44.4 inhabitants per square mile (17.1/km^{2}). There were 516 housing units at an average density of 15.8 per square mile (6.1/km^{2}). The racial makeup of the township was 96.75% White, 0.21% African American, 0.62% Native American, 0.07% Pacific Islander, 0.55% from other races, and 1.80% from two or more races. Hispanic or Latino of any race were 1.52% of the population.

There were 502 households, out of which 36.9% had children under the age of 18 living with them, 73.9% were married couples living together, 6.4% had a female householder with no husband present, and 17.3% were non-families. 14.1% of all households were made up of individuals, and 5.4% had someone living alone who was 65 years of age or older. The average household size was 2.88 and the average family size was 3.17.

In the township the population was spread out, with 27.0% under the age of 18, 6.6% from 18 to 24, 28.6% from 25 to 44, 27.3% from 45 to 64, and 10.6% who were 65 years of age or older. The median age was 38 years. For every 100 females, there were 105.4 males. For every 100 females age 18 and over, there were 106.0 males.

The median income for a household in the township was $61,818, and the median income for a family was $65,938. Males had a median income of $42,171 versus $29,653 for females. The per capita income for the township was $24,059. About 0.2% of families and 1.6% of the population were below the poverty line, including 1.1% of those under age 18 and none of those age 65 or over.

== Notable people ==
- Frank T. Tucker, Wisconsin State Assemblyman and lawyer, was born in the township.

== Gallery ==
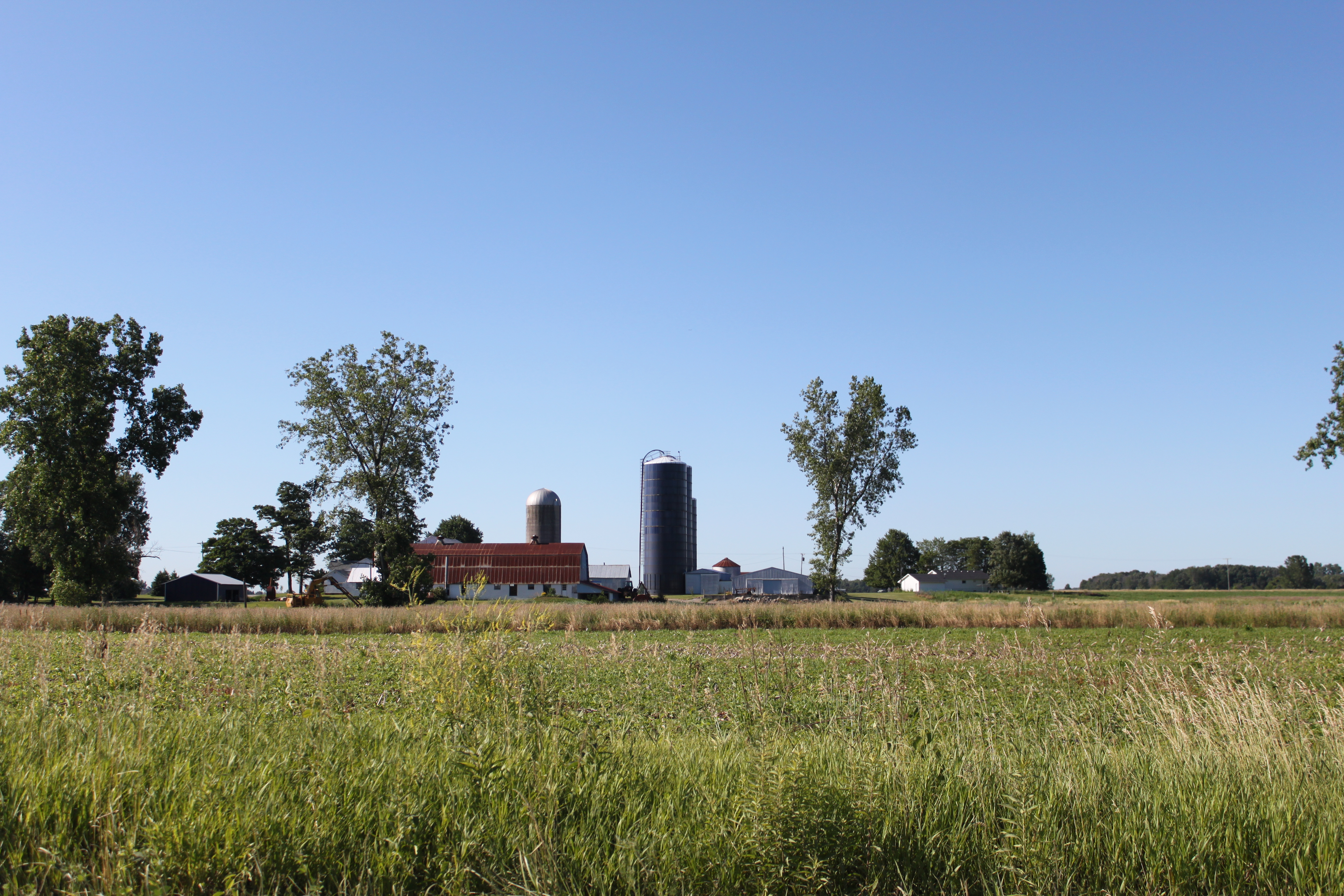
Farm at Ridge Hwy. & County Line Rd.

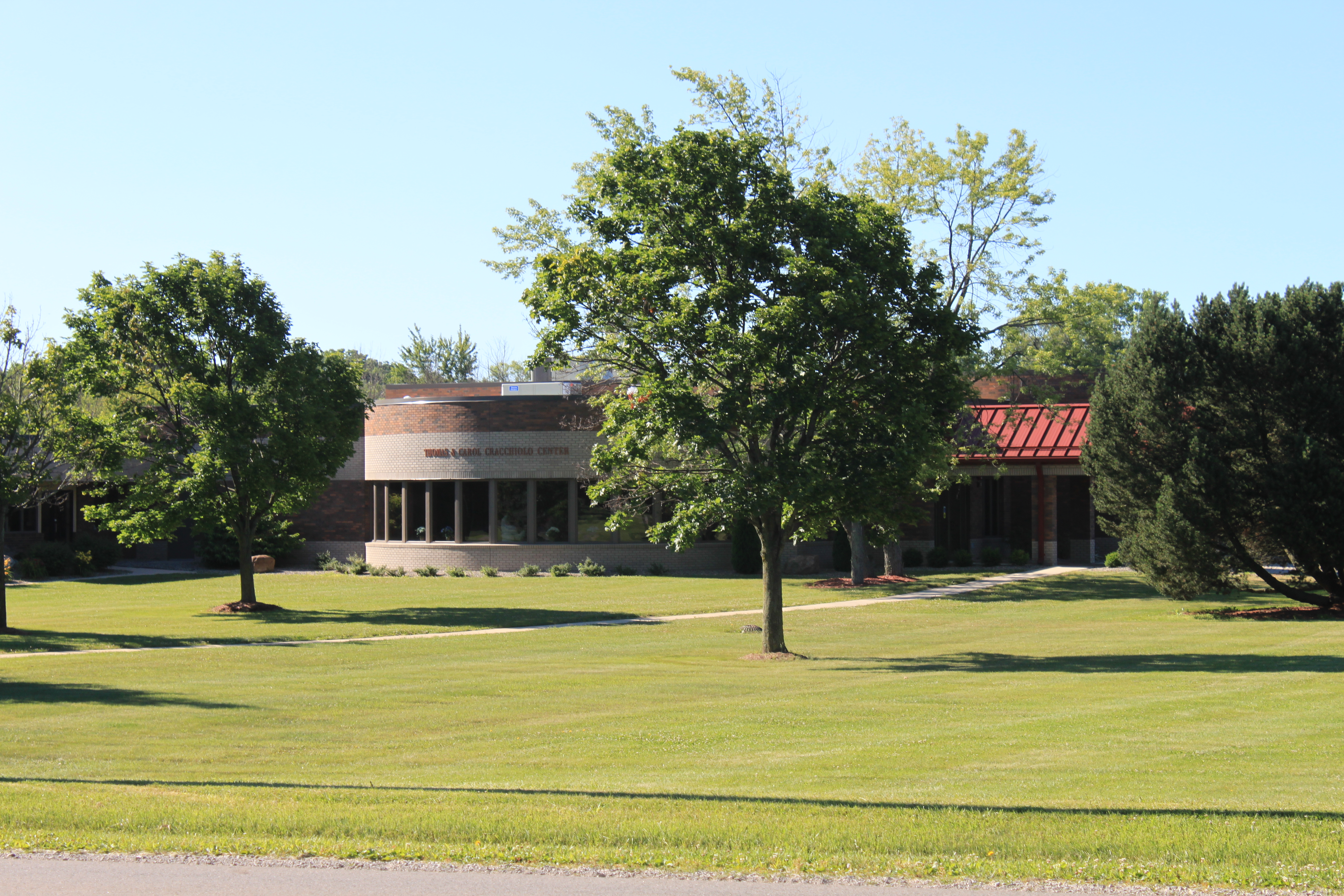
Boysville administration building

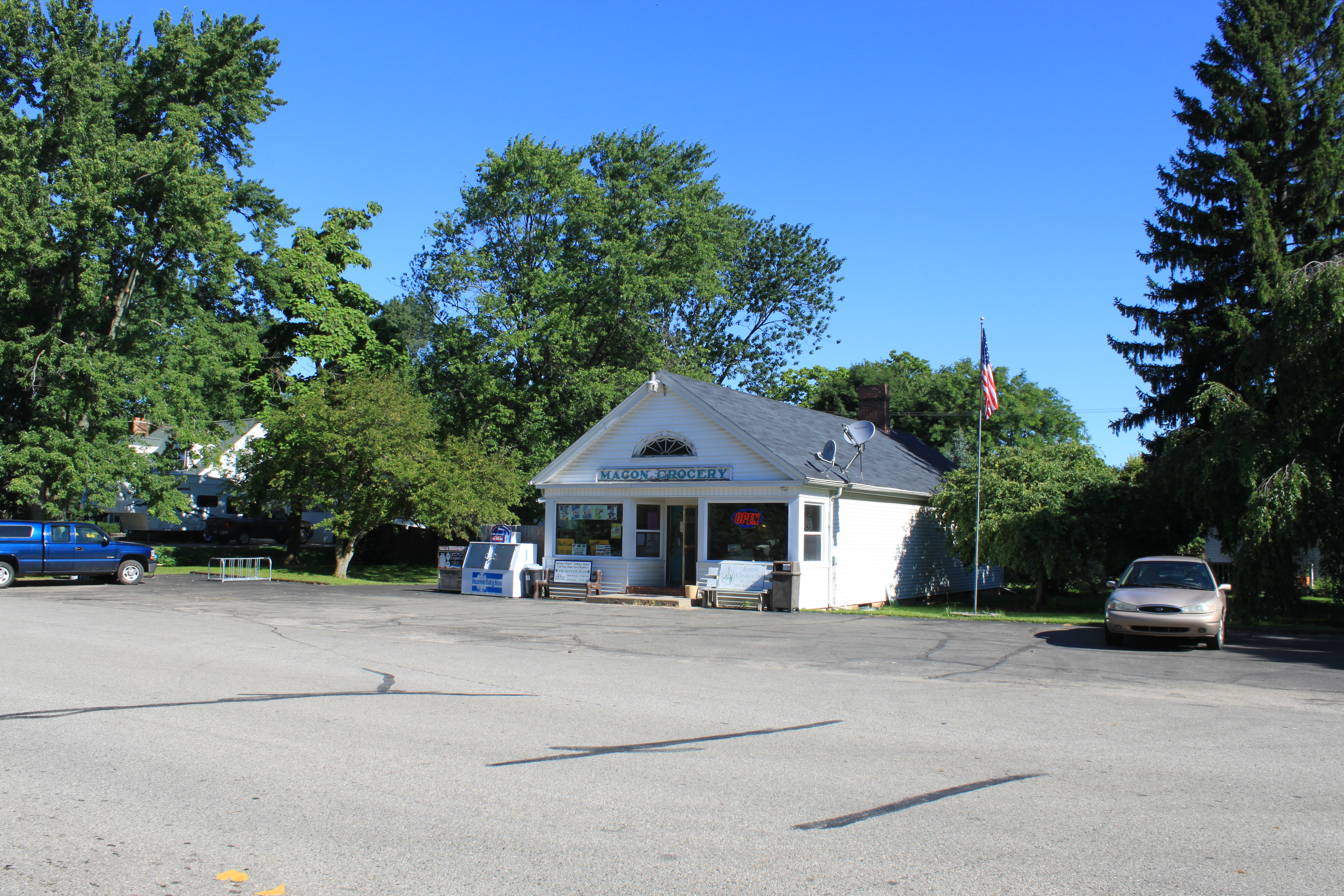
Macon Grocery, Macon-Clinton Rd.

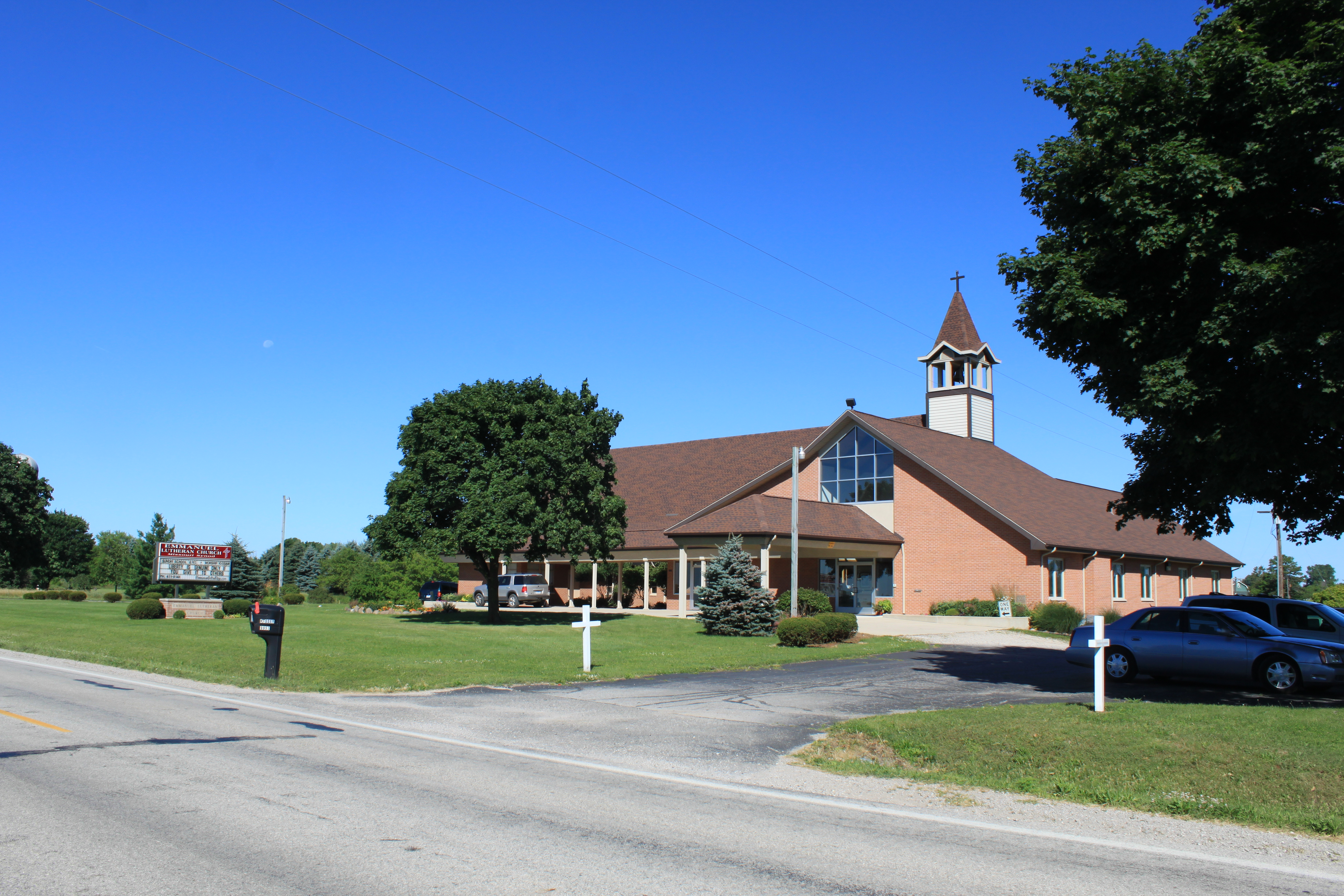
Emmanuel Lutheran Church, Ridge Hwy.

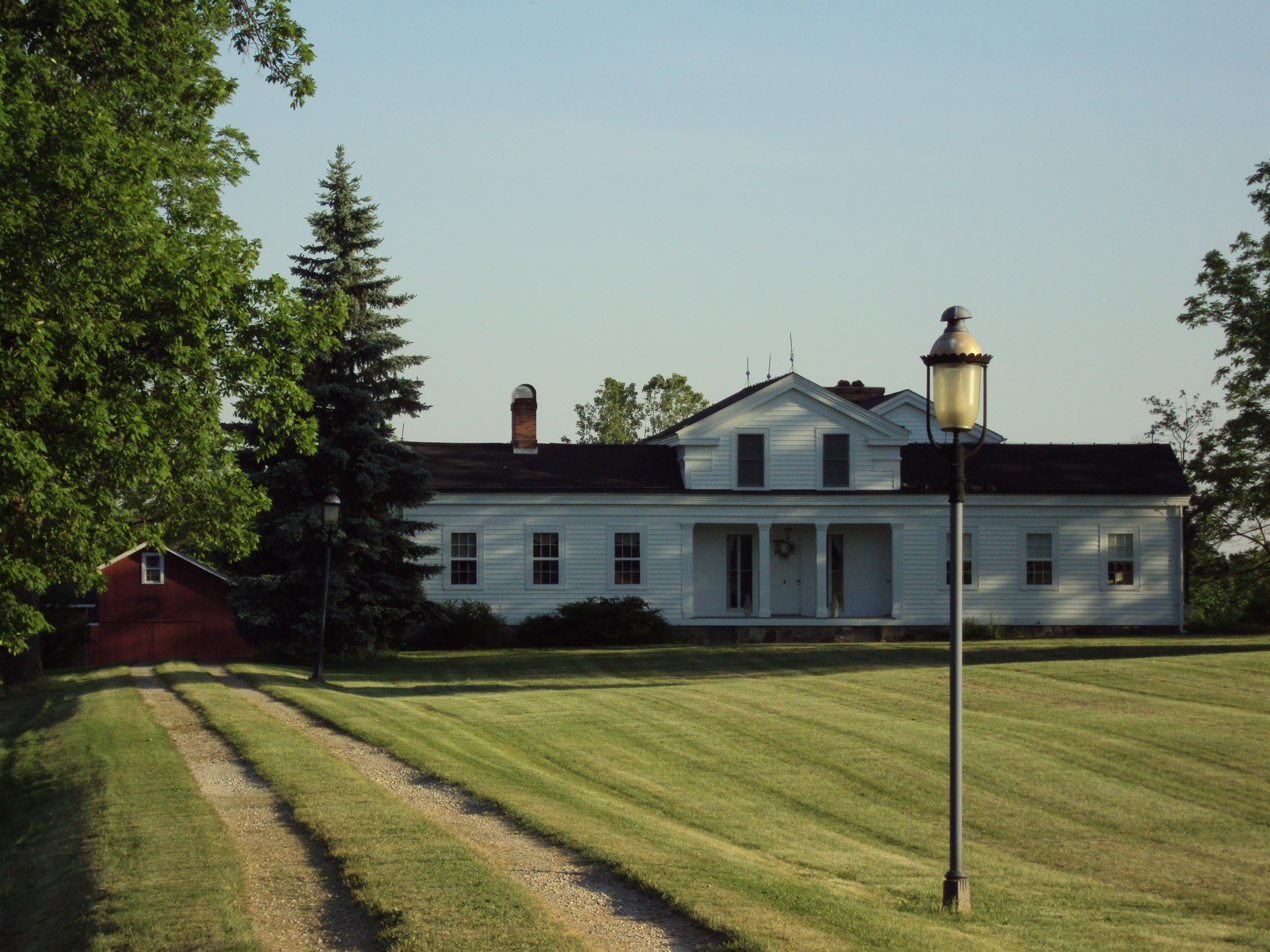
John Pennington–Henry Ford House
