= Murray D. Van Wagoner Memorial Bridge =

- U.S. National Register of Historic Places
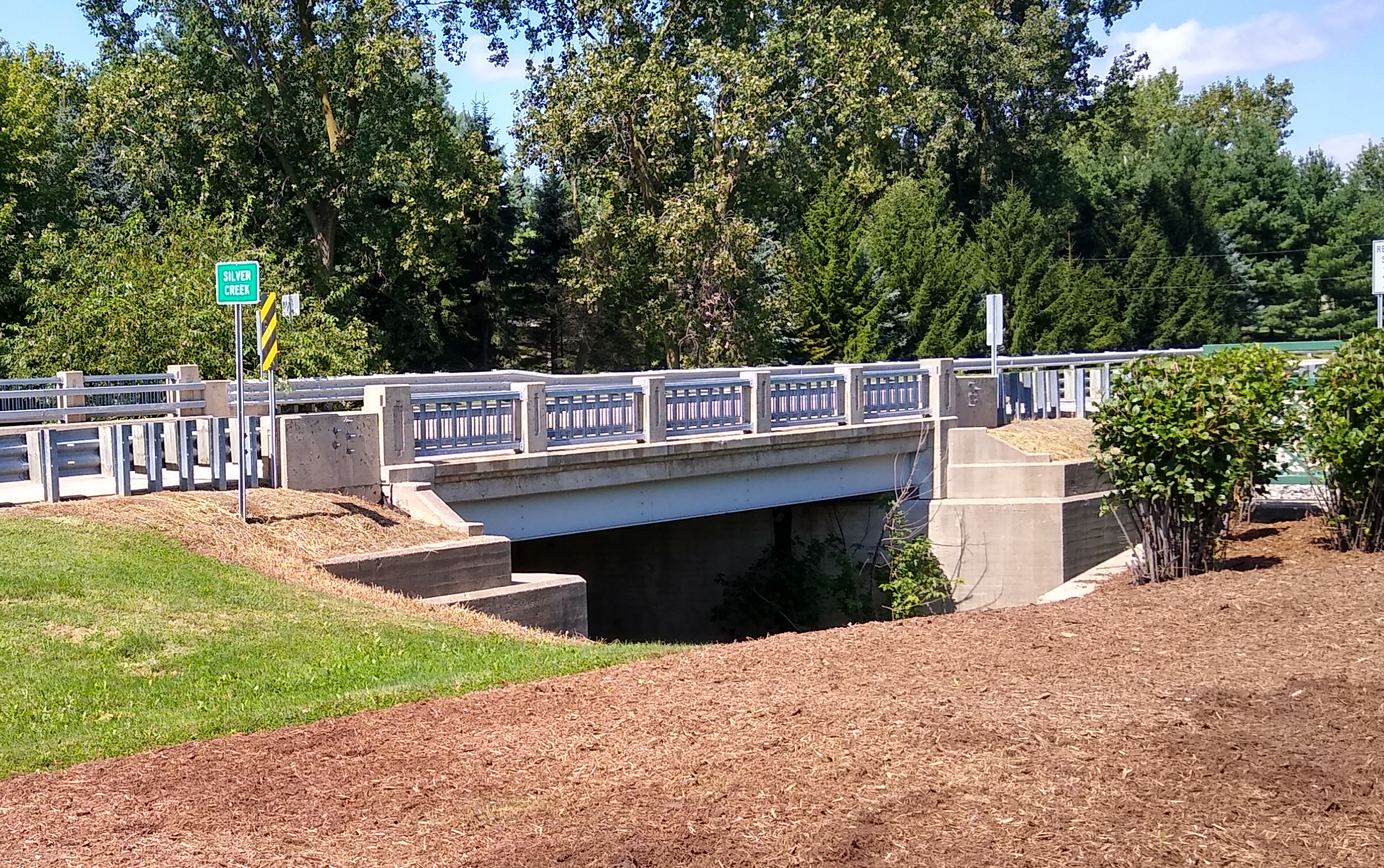
- The Murray D. Van Wagoner Memorial Bridge carrying M-156 over Silver Creek in Morenci, Michigan.

- Location within Michigan Location within the United States
- Interactive map
- Location: M-156 over Silver Creek, Morenci, Michigan
- Coordinates: 41°42′44″N 84°12′42″W
- Area: less than one acre
- Built: 1935
- Built by: W.H. Knapp Company; Michigan State Highway Department
- Architectural style: Steel I-beam stringer
- MPS: Highway Bridges of Michigan MPS
- NRHP reference No.: 99001731
- Added to NRHP: January 27, 2000

The Murray D. Van Wagoner Memorial Bridge is a bridge carrying M-156 over Silver Creek in Morenci, Michigan. It was listed on the National Register of Historic Places in 2000.

== History ==
Morenci was founded in 1852 and served as an important industrial and grain mill center. At one point, a 40-foot (12 m) Pratt pony truss was constructed at this site. However, by the early 1930s, this bridge was in very poor condition. In 1935, the state of Michigan entered into a cooperative venture with the Taft Memorial Highway Association, which had been founded in 1930 to create a memorial highway extending from Florida to Michigan to honor William Howard Taft. Part of the venture involved replacing the bridge at this location.

The state hired Monroe-based W.H. Knapp Company to construct the bridge at a cost of $35,700 (equivalent to $640,864 in 2024). The bridge was dedicated on July 31, 1935, and featured a speech by Murray Van Wagoner, after whom the city council had named the bridge. Van Wagoner was the head of the Michigan State Highway Department from 1933 until 1940, when he was elected governor.

The bridge was rehabilitated in 2000. In 2004, the 1893 Sterling Road truss bridge was relocated from Hillsdale County to the adjacent site for use as a crossing on the pedestrian trail.

== Description ==
The bridge is 45 feet (14 m) long and carries a span with a 41.4-foot-wide (12.6 m) deck with a 33-foot-wide (10 m) roadway bordered by sidewalks. The deck is edged by railings made of concrete posts with ornamental metal lattice sections fixed in between. Approach railings are bolted to the inner face of each endpost. The substructure of the bridge is made up of concrete abutments and wing walls with a decorative stepped motif.

== Gallery ==
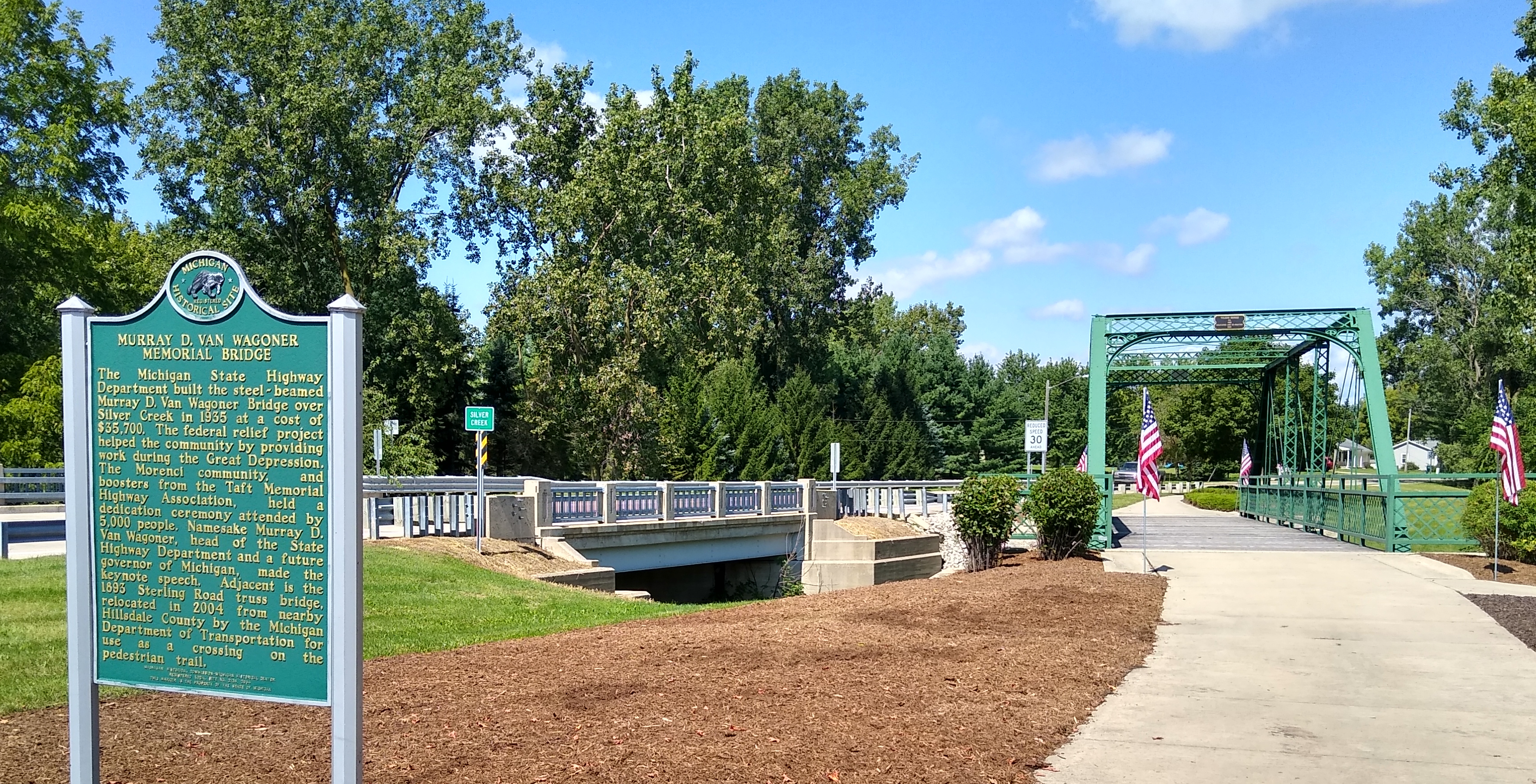
The Murray D. Van Wagoner Memorial Bridge and the 1893 Sterling Road truss bridge.

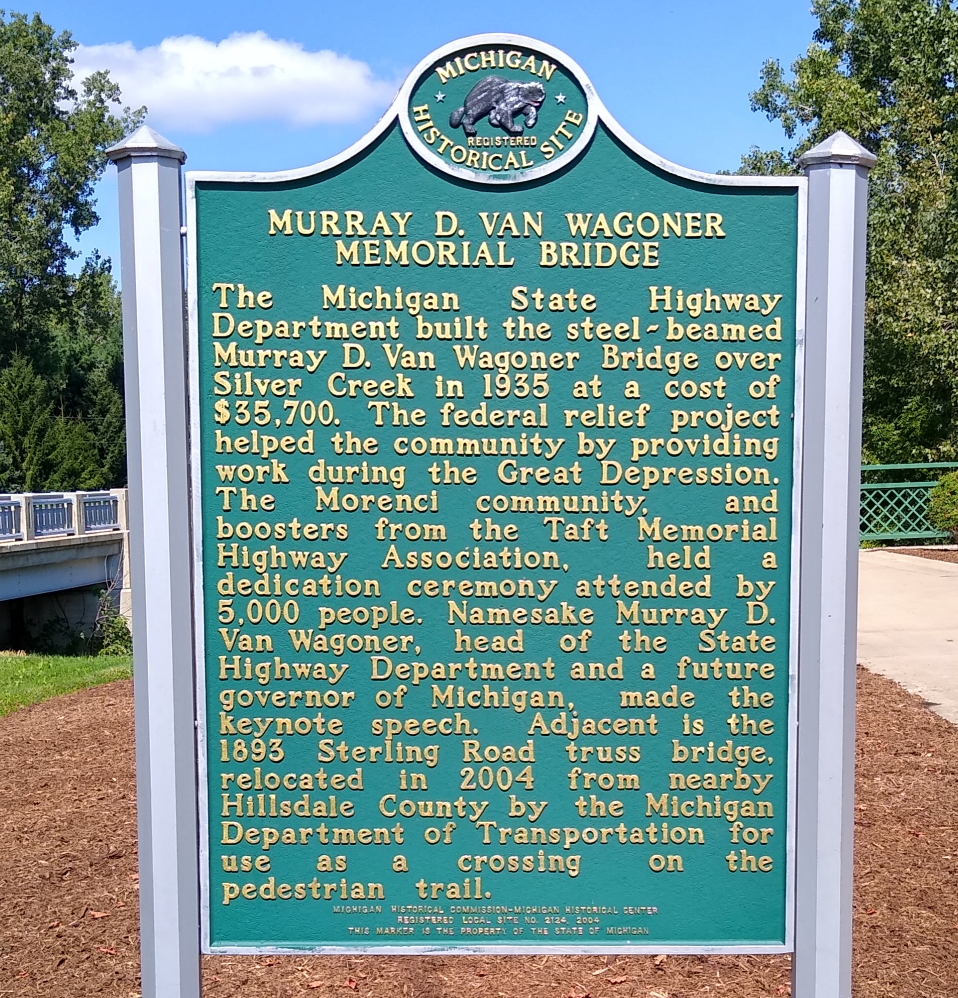
The Michigan Historical Marker for the Murray D. Van Wagoner Memorial Bridge.
