= State Street Historic District (Rochester, New York) =

Historic district in New York, United States

- U.S. National Register of Historic Places
- U.S. Historic district
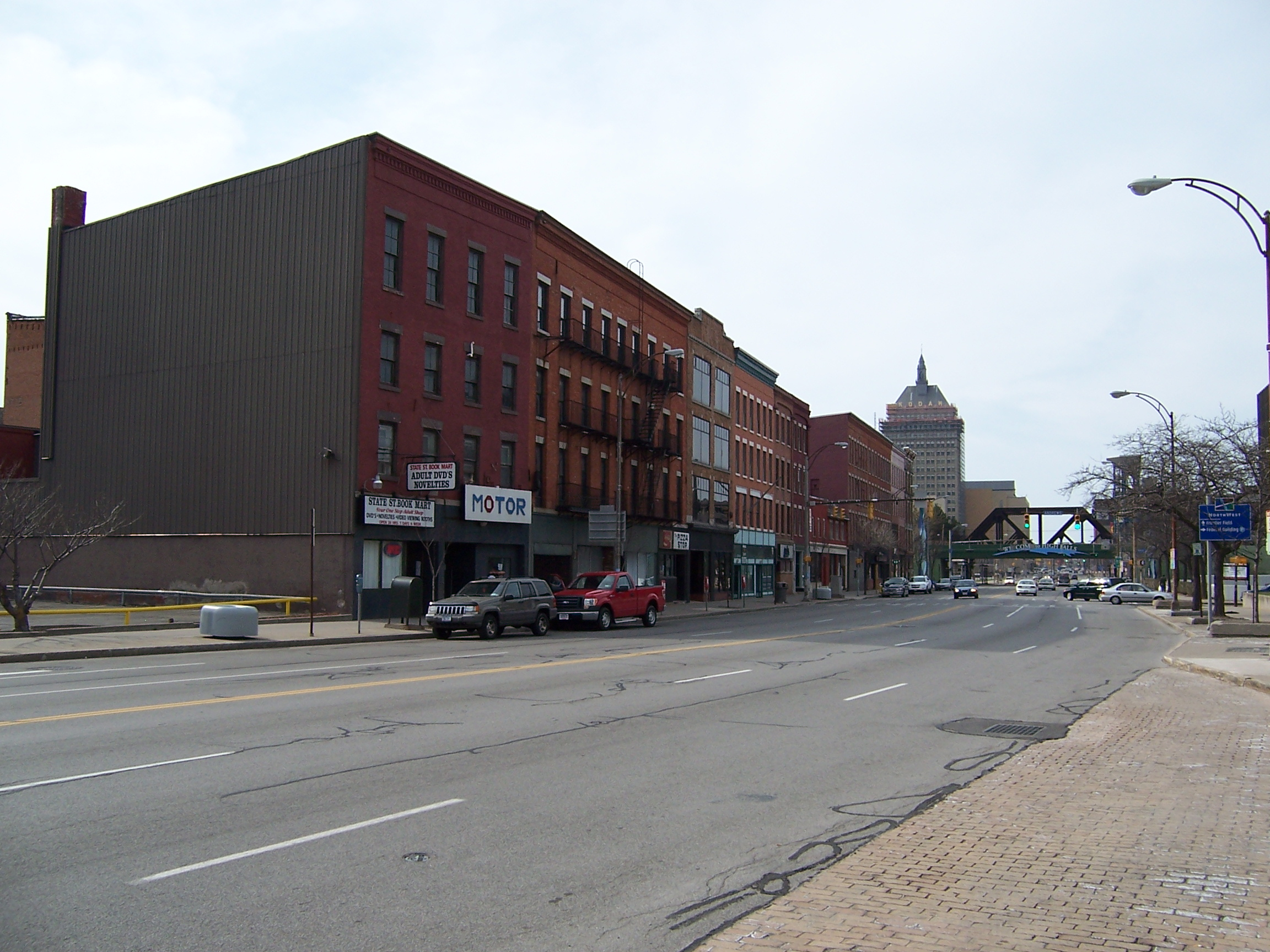
- The State Street Historic District, April 2010

- Location within New York Location within the United States
- Location: 109-173 State St., Rochester, New York
- Coordinates: 43°9′27″N 77°36′55″W
- Area: 1.2 acres (0.49 ha)
- Built: 1825
- Architectural style: Federal, Vernacular Commercial
- MPS: Inner Loop MRA
- NRHP reference No.: 84000402
- Added to NRHP: October 11, 1984

State Street Historic District is a national historic district located at Rochester in Monroe County, New York. The district consists of the last surviving continuous row of 19th-century masonry commercial buildings within Rochester's Inner Loop. They were developed between 1825 and 1900 and the row forms an unpretentious unbroken wall of 12 buildings. The oldest building is located at 141–147 State Street and was constructed about 1825.

It was listed on the National Register of Historic Places in 1984.
