= Saint Michael and All Angels Episcopal Church =

Historic church in Michigan, United States

- Saint Michael and All Angels' Episcopal Church and Cambridge Township Cemetery
- U.S. National Register of Historic Places
- U.S. Historic district
- Michigan State Historic Site
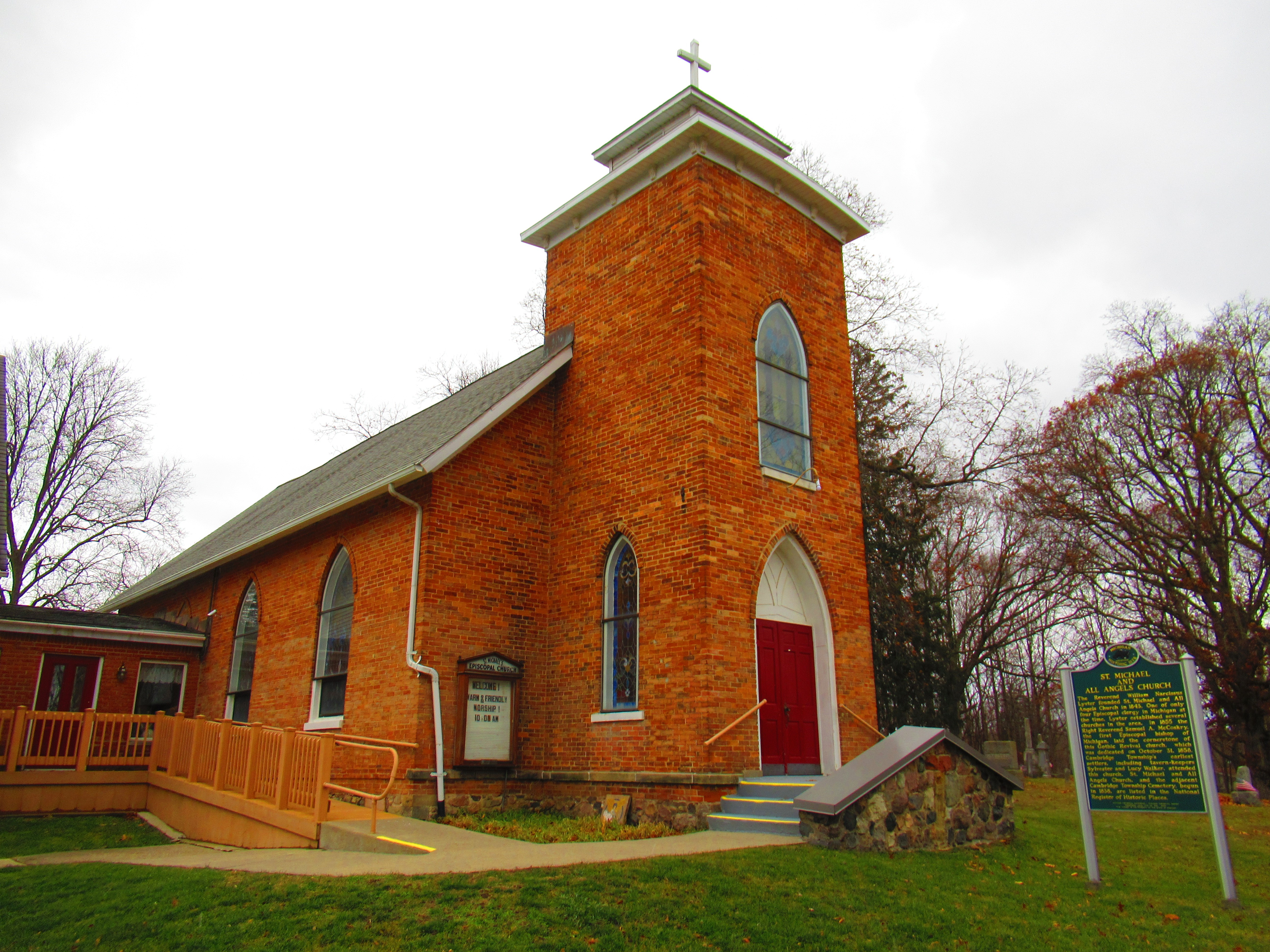
- Saint Michael and All Angels Episcopal Church

- Location within Michigan Location within the United States
- Interactive map
- Location: Old Monroe Pike Road; Cambridge Township, Michigan
- Coordinates: 42°03′19″N 84°13′12″W
- Built: 1855
- Architectural style: Gothic Revival
- NRHP reference No.: 03001550

Significant dates
- Added to NRHP: February 4, 2004
- Designated MSHS: October 2, 1980

The Saint Michael and All Angels Episcopal Church is a historic church located in rural Cambridge Township in northwestern Lenawee County, Michigan. The church was designated as a Michigan Historic Site on October 2, 1980. On February 4, 2004, the church, along with the adjacent Cambridge Township Cemetery, was added to the National Register of Historic Places.

== Description ==
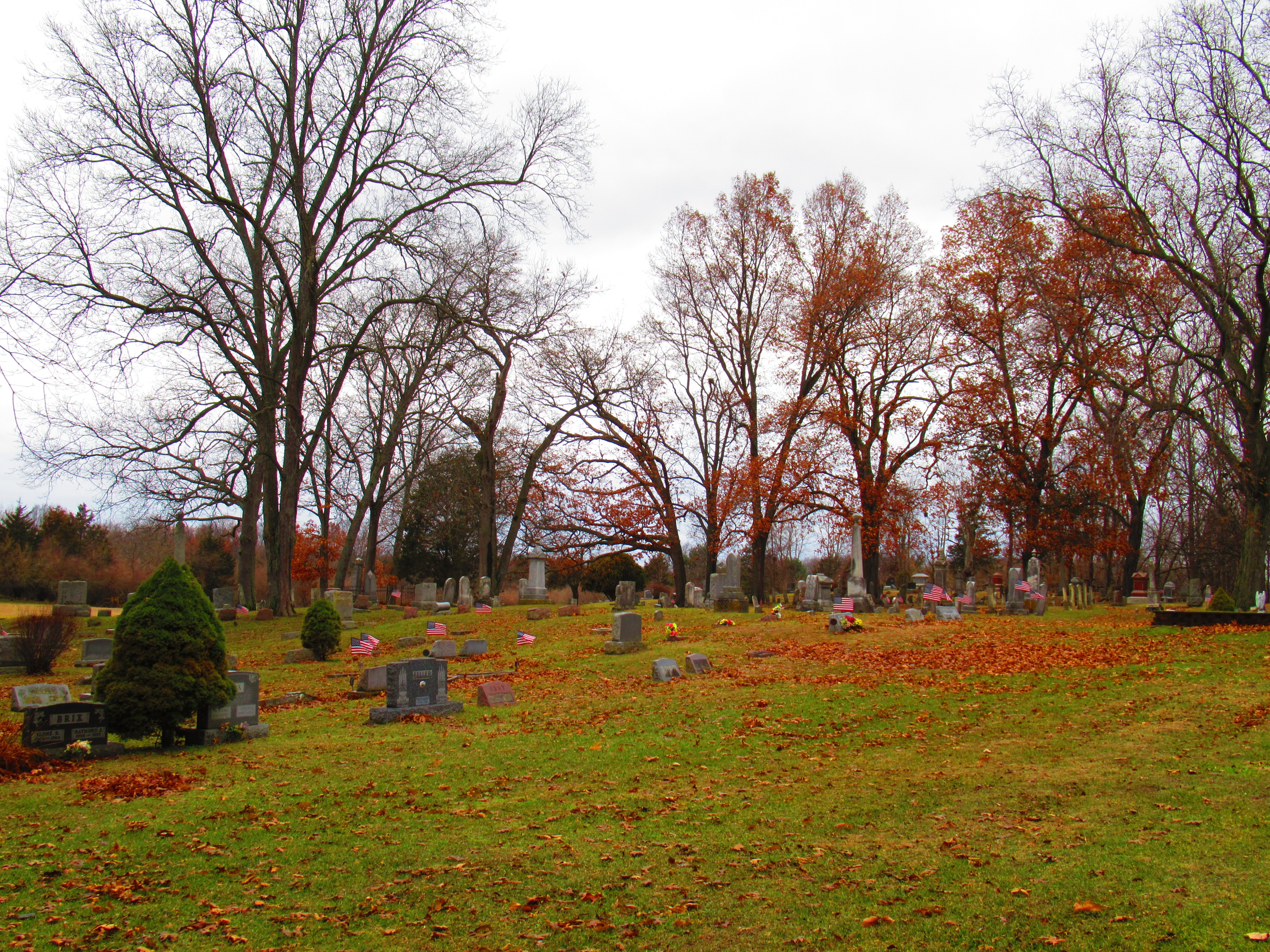
Cambridge Township Cemetery

The Saint Michael and All Angels Episcopal Church is a small church located at 11646 Old Monroe Pike Road near the junction of M-50 and U.S. Route 12. The church is active and is part of the Episcopal Diocese of Michigan. The Cambridge Township Cemetery is located next to the church. While the church is privately owned, the cemetery is owned by the township.

The church is a red brick Gothic Revival building with a gable roof, a fieldstone foundations, and a square-plan tower projecting from the center of the front facade. Three pointed-arch windows filled with stained glass are in the walls of the tower; more similar windows line each side, and an additional one is in the rear. The tower is topped with a pyramid-roof wood belfry. The entrance is through a double door within a pointed arch in the base of the tower, and is reached via shirt staircases leading to a platform.

On the interior, the entry leads to a small vestibule with a flagstone floor. From the vestibule another set of double doors leads to the nave. The nave has white plaster walls and ceiling, and a linoleum covered floor. Eleven rows of pews are set on each side of a central aisle.

The nearby cemetery contains a variety of large, old trees that are randomly located through the area. A lane encircles the cemetery. Grave markers include a variety of nineteenth and twentieth-century monuments and memorials typical for the time and place. The earliest monuments are white marble slabs.

== History ==
Cambridge Township was established in 1835, soon after the area was opened up by the construction of the Chicago Road. As European settlers moved in, a small hamlet soon formed in this general area, known as "Cambridge Junction." In 1838, the township purchased a small plot of land, only 132 feet by 165 feet, for use as a cemetery. Another small plot was added later, and a final two acres was added to the cemetery in 1863. Some of the township's earliest pioneers are buried in the cemetery.

The church, located adjacent to the cemetery, dates back to 1840, when the Rev. William Narcissus Lyster was invited to preach to hold religious services in the area. A small parish was formed in 1843, but soon lapsed. In 1854, the St. Michael's and All Angels parish was reorganized, and plans were made to construct a church, The parish obtained land in 1855, and construction soon began. The first service in the completed church was held on October 31, 1858. The tower was rebuilt in the 1870s, and a parish hall was added in 1956. The church is still used by the St. Michael & All Angels Episcopal Church congregation.
