= Dennis–State Streets Historic District =

Historic district in Michigan, United States

- U.S. National Register of Historic Places
- U.S. Historic district
- Michigan State Historic Site
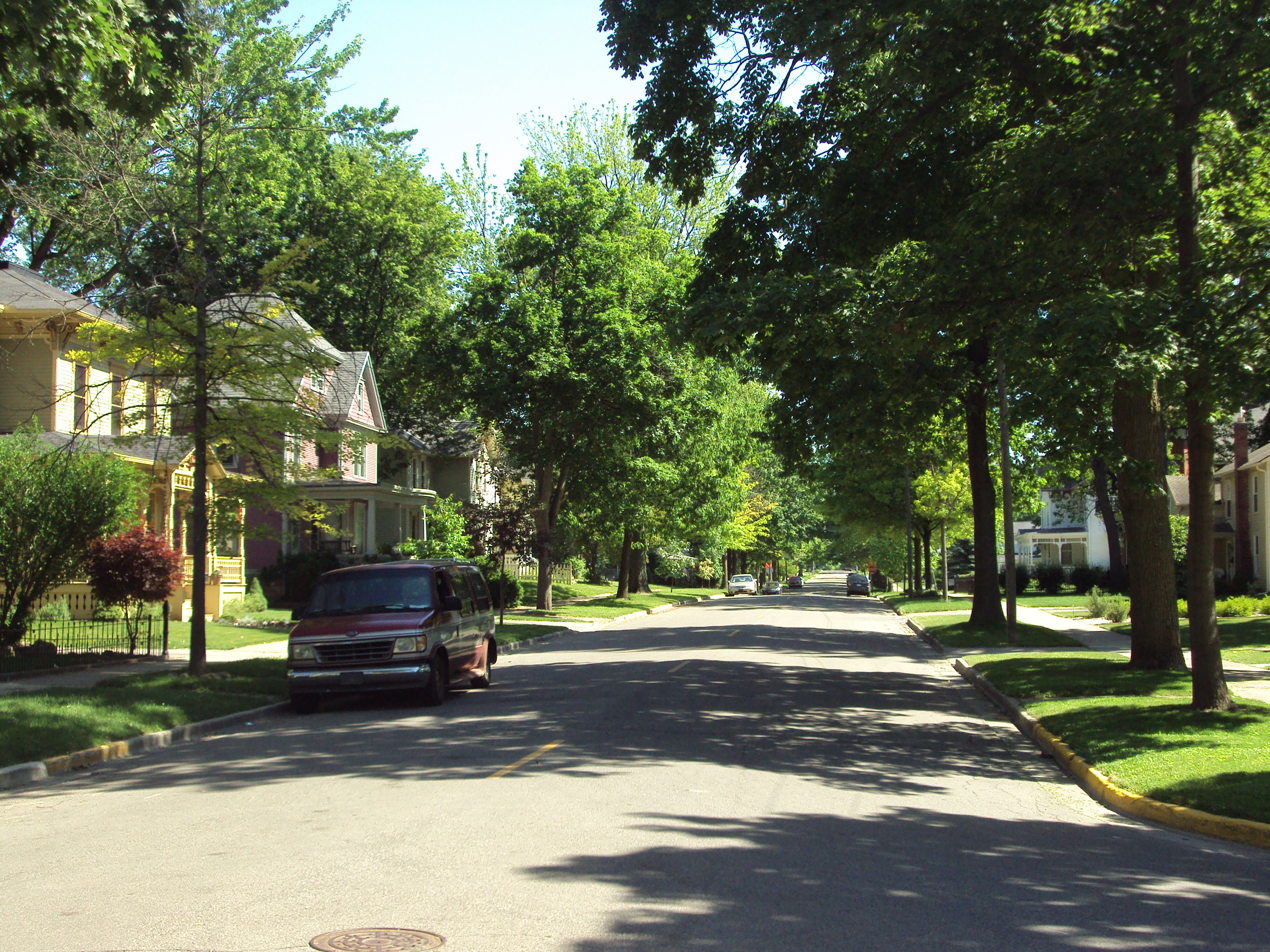

- Location within Michigan Location within the United States
- Interactive map
- Location: Adrian, Michigan
- Coordinates: 41°53′40″N 84°02′11″W
- Architectural style: Mix of Greek Revival, Gothic Revival, Italianate, Queen Anne, and Shingle
- NRHP reference No.: 75002170

Significant dates
- Added to NRHP: April 14, 1975
- Designated MSHS: July 26, 1974

The Dennis–State Streets Historic District is a residential historic district located on the southside of the city of Adrian in Lenawee County, Michigan. It was listed as a Michigan Historic Site on July 26, 1974. The district was later added to the National Register of Historic Places on April 14, 1975. On July 26, 1979, the historic district expanded its boundaries. This expansion, despite consisting of only one additional property, required a separate listing on the National Register of Historic Places.

The district is located just south of the Downtown Adrian Commercial Historic District and just east of M-52, known locally as Main Street. The district is bounded by Union Street on the north, a set of railroad tracks on the south, State Street on the east, and Dennis Street on the west. West Michigan Street also runs through the district. The boundaries of the historic district include all properties fronting on both sides of the streets. Four years after the district was listed on the National Register of Historic Places, one additional property was added. The George L. Bidwell Mansion, known as the Burnham Historical Building, at 204 East Church Street, which is outside the rectangular boundaries of the historic district, was added as a contributing property on July 26, 1979. It was the only property added during this boundary extension.

There are a total of 80 residential structures included as contributing properties within the district. While the area was first settled as early as 1826, some of the oldest surviving structures date back to 1844, when the district was platted.

Originally known as "Berry's Southern Addition," this district was platted in 1844 by Langford and Ambrose Berry on land that they purchased from the estate of 1826 pioneers Adeline and Elias Dennis. Several of the homes in the neighborhood date to the 1840s, when Adrian was linked by railroad to Toledo (1836), Tecumseh (1838), Monroe (1840), and Hudson (1843), and became the sixth largest city in Michigan. Because of the neighborhood's location near Adrian's commercial center, churches, social organizations, factories, and rail lines, many early homes were later remodeled or demolished and replaced with homes in newer styles.

This neighborhood contains homes built with a wide range of nineteenth- and early twentieth-century architectural styles, including octagon, foursquare and Greek Revival.

Notable individuals who have lived in the neighborhood include:

- The inventor Thomas Edison, who worked briefly in 1864 as the telegraph operator at the city's railroad depot. He boarded at the Chittenden House at 322 State Street, where the Queen Anne-style Metcalf-Shierson house stands today.
- Henry Ford's brother-in-law Samuel W. Raymond, who owned Raymond Ford Garage at 215 North Main Street and lived at 449 State Street.
- J. Wallace Page, the inventor of woven wire fence and owner of Page Woven Wire Fence Company, who lived at 510 State Street.
- W. H. Burnham, president of Lamb Fence Company, who lived at 204 East Church Street. This home was also, earlier, the residence of banker W. H. Waldby and, even earlier, of clothing merchant George L. Bidwell, who had the home built during the Civil War.
- Ollie E. Mott, owner of Nu-Way Stretch Suspender Company, who lived at 312 State Street.
- Isabella and William Cocker, who were beneficiaries of Elihu L. Clark's estate estimated to be worth three quarters of a million dollars when Clark died in 1880. They lived at 312 Dennis Street.
- Three generations of the Stevenson family, dealers in lumber and coal on Division Street, including Archimedes Stevenson who lived at 305 Dennis Street, his son Frank A. Stevenson who lived at 327 Dennis Street, and Frank's son William H. Stevenson who lived at 311 Dennis Street.
- Both owners of Hart & Shaw Drugstore, which was located on the southwest corner of Main and Maumee streets, including Byron Shaw, who lived at 304 Dennis Street, and Samuel Hart who lived at 430 Dennis Street before moving to 417 State Street.
- J. H. Champion, editor of the Adrian Watchtower newspaper, who lived at 523 Winter Street.
