= Franklin Township, Fulton County, Ohio =

Township in Ohio, US

- Township
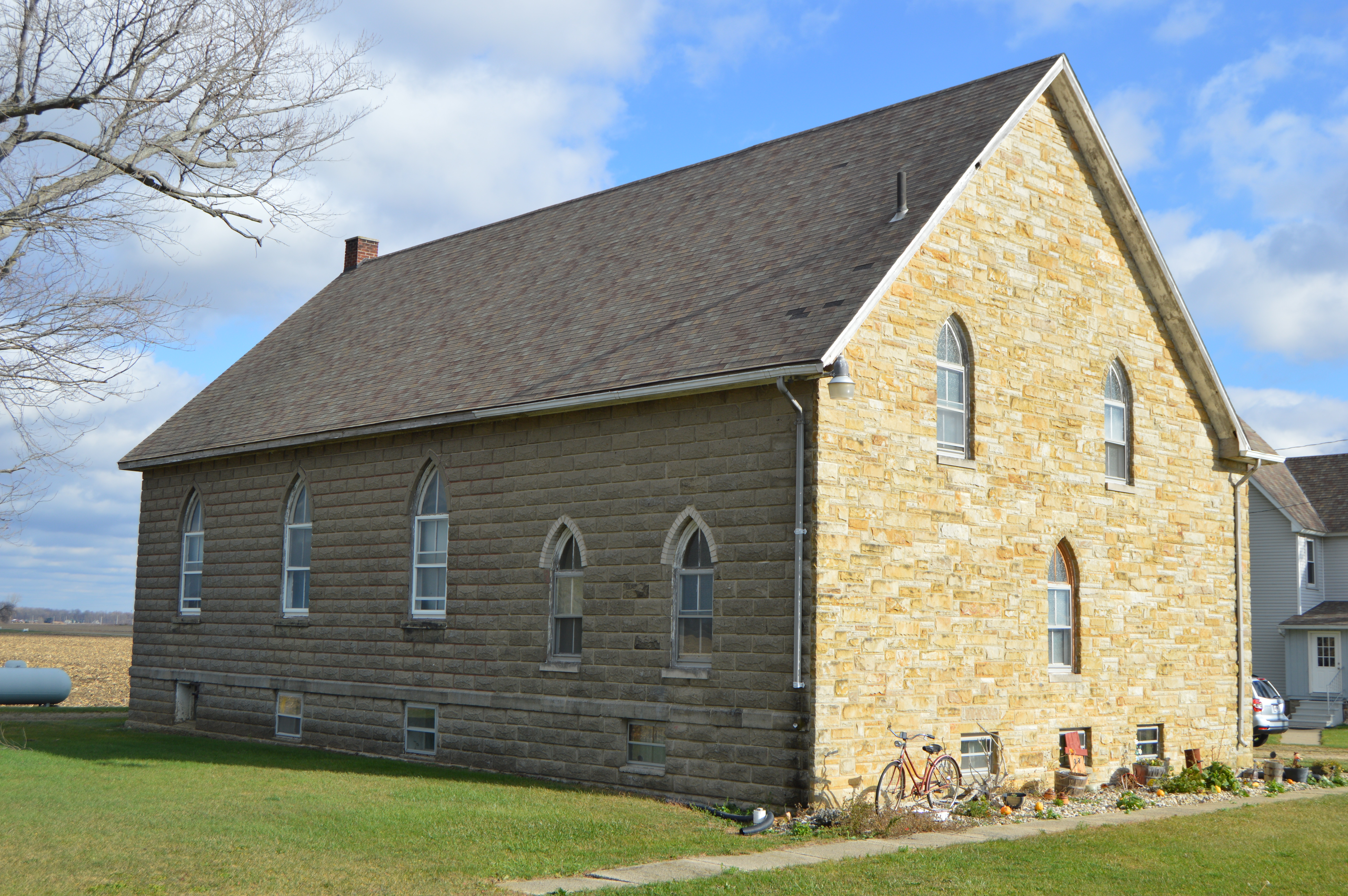
- Former Ambrose Baptist Church on Road L

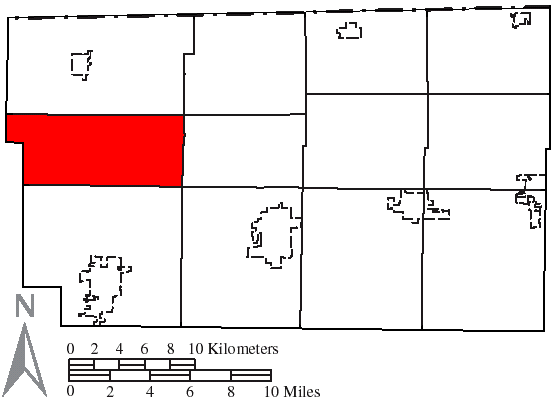
- Location of Franklin Township in Fulton County
- Coordinates: 41°36′53″N 84°18′45″W
- Country: United States
- State: Ohio
- County: Fulton

Area
  - Total: 28.8 sq mi (74.6 km^{2})
  - Land: 28.8 sq mi (74.5 km^{2})
  - Water: 0.077 sq mi (0.2 km^{2})
- Elevation: 725 ft (221 m)

Population (2020)
  - Total: 695
  - Density: 24.2/sq mi (9.33/km^{2})
- Time zone: UTC-5 (Eastern (EST))
  - Summer (DST): UTC-4 (EDT)
- FIPS code: 39-28294
- GNIS feature ID: 1086124

Franklin Township is one of the twelve townships of Fulton County, Ohio, United States. The 2020 census found 695 people in the township.

== Geography ==
Located in the western part of the county, it borders the following townships:

- Gorham Township - north
- Chesterfield Township - northeast corner
- Dover Township - east
- Clinton Township - southeast corner
- German Township - south
- Brady Township, Williams County - west
- Mill Creek Township, Williams County - northwest

No municipalities are located in Franklin Township.

== Name and history ==
It is one of twenty-one Franklin Townships statewide.

Part of the "Old State Line," originally surveyed as the Ordinance line, is located in the township. Michigan once considered the northern part of Ohio, a difference of about eight miles known as the Toledo Strip, as its own. Ohio and Michigan came to blows in an 1835-1836 confrontation between the state militias known as the Toledo War over the location of the state line between the two states.

== Government ==
The township is governed by a three-member board of trustees, who are elected in November of odd-numbered years to a four-year term beginning on the following January 1. Two are elected in the year after the presidential election and one is elected in the year before it. There is also an elected township fiscal officer, who serves a four-year term beginning on April 1 of the year after the election, which is held in November of the year before the presidential election. Vacancies in the fiscal officership or on the board of trustees are filled by the remaining trustees.

== Public services ==
=== Public Schools ===
Students from the township are served by the following public local school districts:

- Archbold Area Local School District
- Fayette Local School District

=== Mail ===
Mail is delivered in the township by the following U.S. Post Office locations:

- Archbold, Ohio 43502
- Fayette, Ohio 43521
- Wauseon, Ohio 43567
- West Unity, Ohio 43570

=== Telephone ===
Most of the township lies within the Fayette telephone exchange, which is served by Frontier North, with telephone numbers using the following Numbering Plan Codes:

- 419-237
- 419-500
- 567-404

A smaller eastern portion of the township is within the Wauseon telephone exchange, which is served by UTO (United Telephone Company of Ohio,) doing business as CenturyLink, with telephone numbers using the following Numbering Plan Codes:

- 419-330
- 419-335
- 419-337
- 419-388
- 419-404
- 419-583
- 419-590

=== Electric ===
Toledo Edison and Midwest Energy Cooperative serves the township with electricity.

=== Highways ===
Ohio Turnpike Exit 25 intersects Ohio State Route 66 that runs through the township.

- Ohio Turnpike
  - I-80
  - I-90
- SR 66
