= Fayette Local School District =

School district in Ohio

Coordinates: 41°40′N 84°20′W

Location
- Fayette, Ohio; U.S.

District information
- Type: Public School District
- Motto: "Do it the Eagle way."

Students and staff
- Students: Grades PK-12

Other information
- Website: https://www.fayettesch.org/

Fayette Local School District is a school district in Northwest Ohio. The school district serves students who live in the village of Fayette as well as Gorham and Franklin Townships in Fulton County. The superintendent is Angela Belcher.

On August 26, 2008, board of education members voted to drop the word "Gorham" from the name of the school. It is now known as the Fayette Local School District.

== Grades 7-12 ==
- Fayette High School

== Grades 4-6 ==
- Fayette Elementary School

== Grades K-3 ==
- Franklin Elementary School
