= Lenawee County Railroad =

Railway company in Michigan, US, 1977–1990

Overview
- Headquarters: Adrian, Michigan
- Reporting mark: LCRC, LCRR
- Locale: Lenawee County, Michigan
- Dates of operation: 1977–1990

Technical
- Track gauge: 1,435 mm (4 ft 8 1/2 in)
- Length: 31.3 miles (50.4 km)

The Lenawee County Railroad was a shortline railroad in the state of Michigan. It was incorporated in 1977 to operate a former Penn Central line serving Adrian, Michigan, and eventually operated 30 miles (48 km) of lines in Lenawee County, Michigan. The company ceased operations in 1990. The Adrian and Blissfield Rail Road, founded in 1991, operates over some of the company's lines.

== History ==
Under the provisions of the Regional Rail Reorganization Act, states could provide subsidies for the operation of services over lines that were not included in the Conrail system. In the first decade nine new shortline railroads were founded to take advantage of these subsidies and operate lines that would otherwise have been abandoned.

The Lenawee County Railroad was incorporated on March 9, 1977. On October 1, it succeeded Conrail as the designated operator of 8 miles (13 km) of the ex-Penn Central Old Road branch between Adrian, Michigan, and Lenawee Junction (where it connected with the Clinton branch). On April 1, 1978, it took over the Morenci branch between Morenci, Michigan, and Grosvenor, near Blissfield, Michigan. The company purchased 3.8 miles (6.1 km) of the ex-Detroit, Toledo and Ironton Railroad Tecumesh branch in 1979 and used trackage rights over the Norfolk and Western Railway to reach Adrian from Morenci and Weston, Michigan.

In 1982, Penn Central abandoned the Morenci branch between Weston and Grosvenor after the bridge over the River Raisin was damaged. At the same time the state acquired the Old Road between Lenawee Junction and Riga, Michigan, and contracted with the Lenawee County Railroad to operate it. The railroad ceased all operations on September 30, 1990.

The Adrian and Blissfield Rail Road succeeded the Lenawee County Railroad as the operator of the Old Road between Adrian and Riga in December 1990.
