= Mill Creek Township, Williams County, Ohio =

Township in Ohio, US

- Township
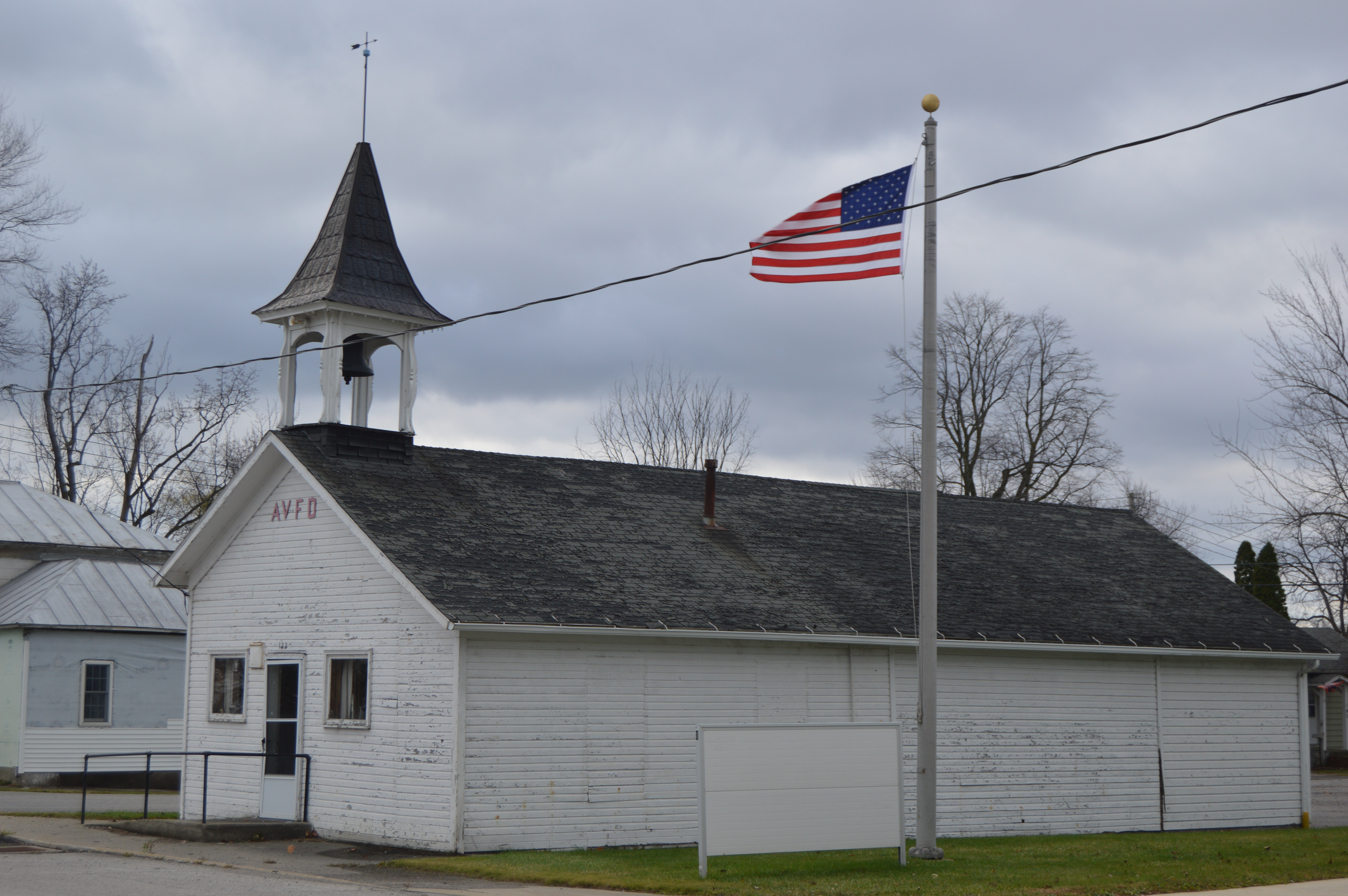
- Township hall in Alvordton

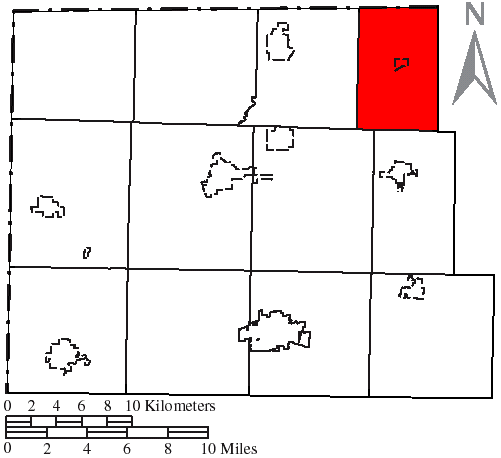
- Location of Mill Creek Township in Williams County
- Coordinates: 41°39′50″N 84°26′4″W
- Country: United States
- State: Ohio
- County: Williams

Area
  - Total: 24.2 sq mi (62.7 km^{2})
  - Land: 24.2 sq mi (62.7 km^{2})
  - Water: 0 sq mi (0.0 km^{2})
- Elevation: 869 ft (265 m)

Population (2020)
  - Total: 752
  - Density: 31.1/sq mi (12.0/km^{2})
- Time zone: UTC-5 (Eastern (EST))
  - Summer (DST): UTC-4 (EDT)
- FIPS code: 39-50302
- GNIS feature ID: 1087172

Mill Creek Township is one of the twelve townships of Williams County, Ohio, United States. The 2020 census found 752 people in the township.

== Geography ==
Located in the northeastern corner of the county along the Michigan state line, it borders the following townships:

- Wright Township, Hillsdale County, Michigan - north
- Gorham Township, Fulton County - east
- Franklin Township, Fulton County - southeast
- Brady Township - south
- Jefferson Township - southwest
- Madison Township - west
- Amboy Township, Hillsdale County, Michigan - northwest

The census-designated place of Alvordton is located in central Mill Creek Township. The township lies within the Toledo Strip, a contested ribbon of land over which Ohio and Michigan came to blows in an 1835–36 confrontation known as the Toledo War.

== Name and history ==
Mill Creek Township was organized in 1835, and named after Mill Creek. Statewide, the only other Mill Creek Township is located in Coshocton County, although there is a Millcreek Township in Union County and formerly a Millcreek Township in Hamilton County.

== Government ==
The township is governed by a three-member board of trustees, who are elected in November of odd-numbered years to a four-year term beginning on the following January 1. Two are elected in the year after the presidential election and one is elected in the year before it. There is also an elected township fiscal officer, who serves a four-year term beginning on April 1 of the year after the election, which is held in November of the year before the presidential election. Vacancies in the fiscal officership or on the board of trustees are filled by the remaining trustees.
