= Chicago and Canada Southern Railway =

Overview
- Parent company: Canada Southern Railway (1871–1879); Lake Shore and Michigan Southern Railway (1879–1888)
- Locale: Southeast Michigan
- Dates of operation: 1871–1888
- Successor: Detroit and Chicago Railroad

Technical
- Track gauge: 1,435 mm (4 ft 8 1/2 in)
- Length: 67.6 miles (108.8 km)

The Chicago and Canada Southern Railway was a planned extension of the Canada Southern Railway west from Grosse Ile, Michigan, to Chicago, Illinois. The line was only built to Fayette, Ohio, and was later split between the Detroit, Toledo and Ironton Railway and Lake Shore and Michigan Southern Railway.

== History ==
The Canada Southern Railway was founded in 1868 to build a new direct railway route from Niagara Falls to the Detroit River, across Southern Ontario, and then on to Chicago. The completed line, running between Fort Erie, Ontario, and Amherstburg, Ontario, opened in February 1873. Connection with lines in Michigan was made via a train ferry and the Canada Southern Bridge Company across Grosse Ile.

The Canada Southern Railway established the Chicago and Canada Southern Railway to extend west toward Chicago. Between 1871 and 1888 four companies bore the name Chicago and Canada Southern Railway. The first was incorporated on May 19, 1871, in Indiana. The company constructed no track, and was consolidated on July 3 of that year with the Michigan Air Line Railroad, an Illinois company. (Note: Not to be confused with the Michigan Air Line Railroad, with the same backers, which built a line between Richmond, Michigan, and South Bend, Indiana.) This new company existed only three days before being consolidated with the North Western Ohio Railroad to form the third Chicago and Canada Southern Railway. Finally, on October 25, 1871, this company was consolidated with the South Eastern Michigan Railway to form the fourth Chicago and Canada Southern Railway.

Construction began in 1872. On July 4, 1872, it was opened between the Lake Shore and Michigan Southern Railway's (LS&MS) main line at "Grosvenor" (near Blissfield, Michigan) and Fayette, Ohio. It was completed between Grosvenor and Grosse Ile on November 13, 1873. The Panic of 1873 halted any further expansion. The company hired John S. "Jack" Casement, who had worked on the Union Pacific Railroad, but Fayette remained the southern extent of the line. The LS&MS leased the Chicago and Canada Southern Railway in November 1879. The LS&MS reorganized it as the Detroit and Chicago Railroad on September 25, 1888.

The track between Grosvenor and "Corbus" (west of Deerfield, Michigan), in the middle of the line, was abandoned in 1893. The line between Corbus and Dundee, Michigan, was abandoned in 1897, and the Detroit and Lima Northern Railroad acquired the eastern end of the line, except for the last half mile to Slocum Junction, which was abandoned. This line became part of the main line of the Detroit, Toledo and Ironton Railway and remains extant as the Canadian National Railway's Flat Rock Subdivision. The western end between Grosvenor and Fayette remained as the Morenci branch; the last portions of it were abandoned in 1991.

West from Montpelier, Ohio to beyond North Liberty, Indiana, the unfinished C&CS alignment was later used by the Wabash Railroad, which completed its line between Montpelier and Gary, Indiana in 1893.
