= Madison Township, Williams County, Ohio =

Township in Ohio, US

- Township
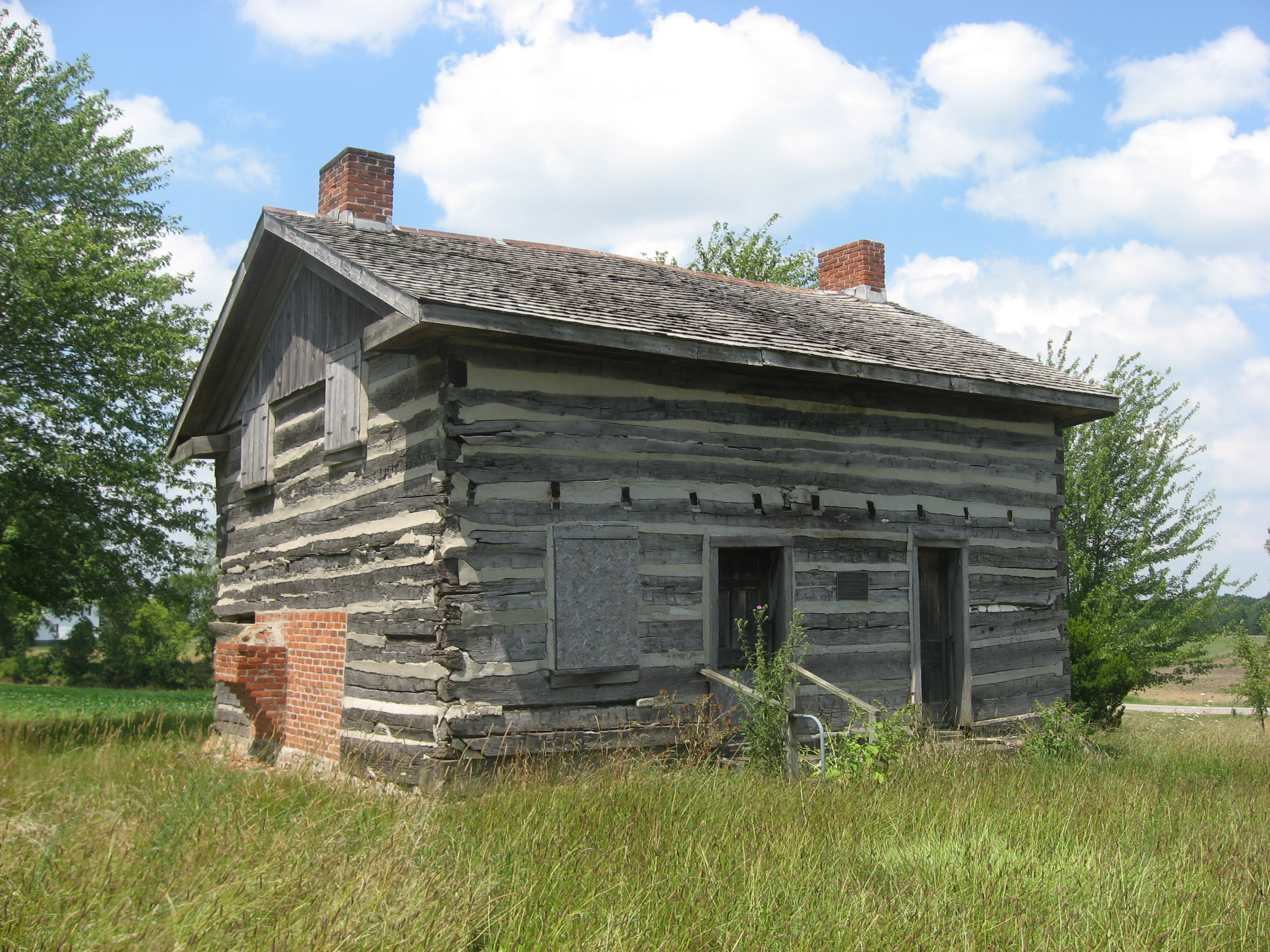
- The Kunkle Log House, a historic site in the township

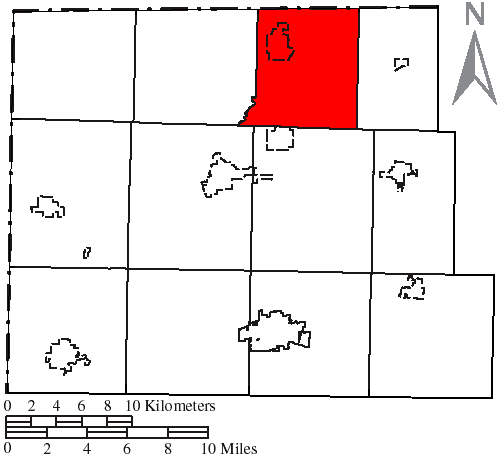
- Location of Madison Township in Williams County
- Coordinates: 41°40′3″N 84°32′15″W
- Country: United States
- State: Ohio
- County: Williams

Area
  - Total: 30.3 sq mi (78.4 km^{2})
  - Land: 30.2 sq mi (78.2 km^{2})
  - Water: 0.077 sq mi (0.2 km^{2})
- Elevation: 876 ft (267 m)

Population (2020)
  - Total: 895
  - Density: 30/sq mi (11.4/km^{2})
- Time zone: UTC-5 (Eastern (EST))
  - Summer (DST): UTC-4 (EDT)
- FIPS code: 39-46634
- GNIS feature ID: 1087171

Madison Township is one of the twelve townships of Williams County, Ohio, United States. The 2020 census found 895 people in the township.

== Geography ==
Located in the northern part of the county along the Michigan state line, it borders the following townships:

- Amboy Township, Hillsdale County, Michigan - north
- Mill Creek Township - east
- Jefferson Township - south
- Superior Township - southwest
- Bridgewater Township - west

The village of Pioneer is located in northwestern Madison Township, and the census-designated place of Kunkle is located in its southwest. The township lies within the Toledo Strip, a contested ribbon of land over which Ohio and Michigan came to blows in an 1835–36 confrontation known as the Toledo War.

== Name and history ==
Madison Township was organized in 1843, and named for James Madison, 4th President of the United States. It is one of twenty Madison Townships statewide.

== Government ==
The township is governed by a three-member board of trustees, who are elected in November of odd-numbered years to a four-year term beginning on the following January 1. Two are elected in the year after the presidential election and one is elected in the year before it. There is also an elected township fiscal officer, who serves a four-year term beginning on April 1 of the year after the election, which is held in November of the year before the presidential election. Vacancies in the fiscal officership or on the board of trustees are filled by the remaining trustees.
