= Gorham Township, Fulton County, Ohio =

Township in Ohio, US

- Township
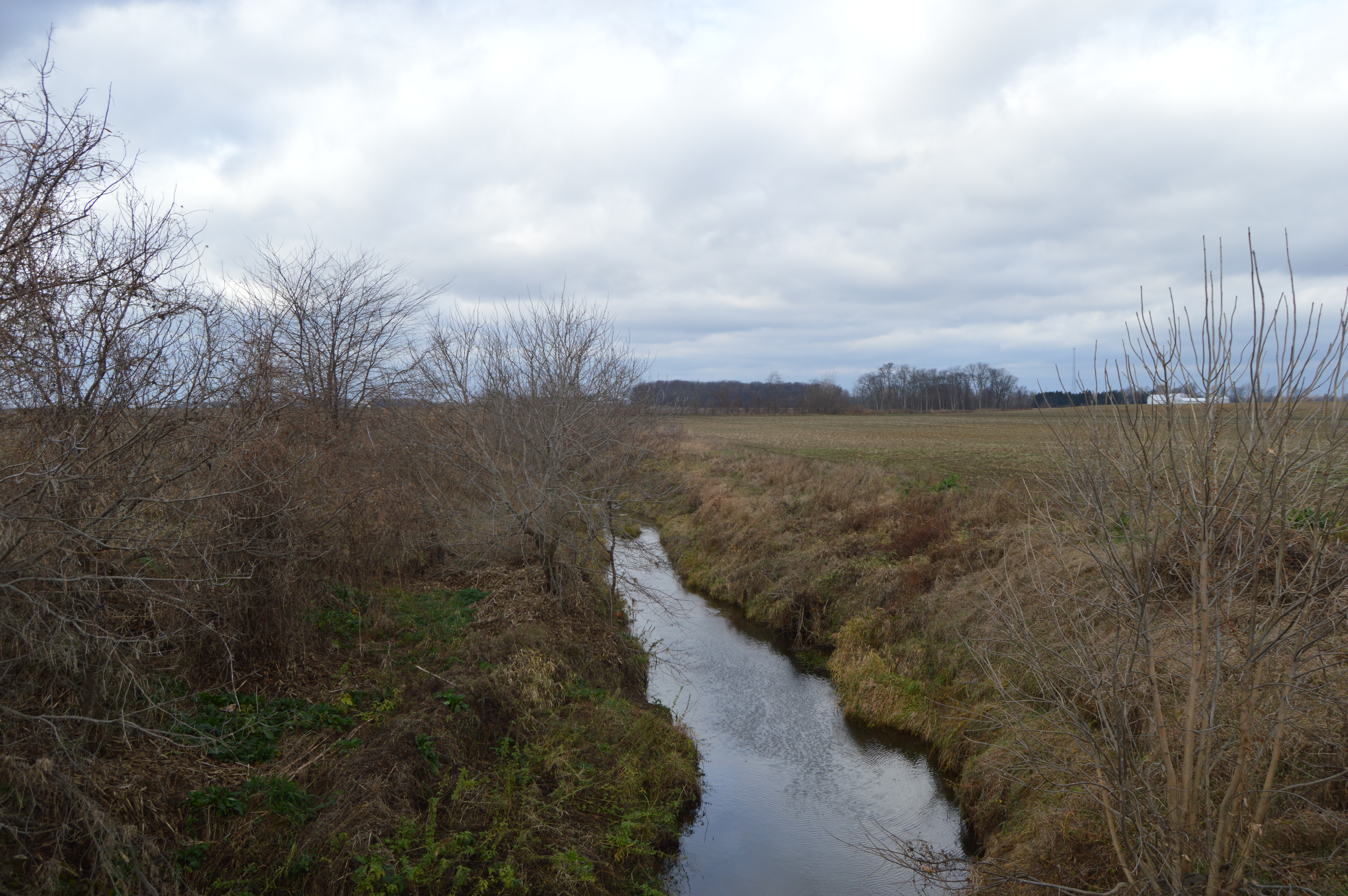
- Deer Creek east of Fayette

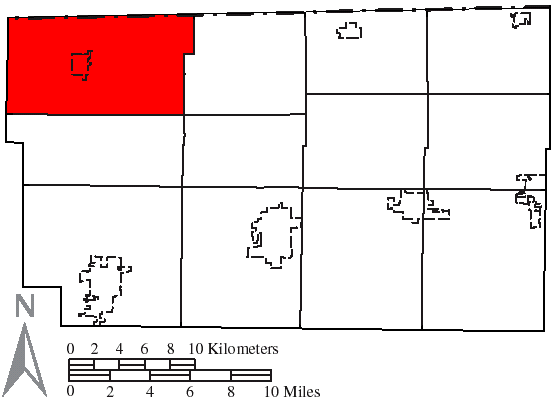
- Location of Gorham Township in Fulton County
- Coordinates: 41°40′27″N 84°19′7″W
- Country: United States
- State: Ohio
- County: Fulton

Area
  - Total: 43.6 sq mi (112.8 km^{2})
  - Land: 43.4 sq mi (112.4 km^{2})
  - Water: 0.15 sq mi (0.4 km^{2})
- Elevation: 750 ft (230 m)

Population (2020)
  - Total: 2,168
  - Density: 49.96/sq mi (19.29/km^{2})
- Time zone: UTC-5 (Eastern (EST))
  - Summer (DST): UTC-4 (EDT)
- FIPS code: 39-30940
- GNIS feature ID: 1086127

Gorham Township is one of the twelve townships of Fulton County, Ohio, United States. The 2020 census found 2,168 people in the township.

== Geography ==
Located in the northwestern corner of the county along the Michigan line, it borders the following townships:

- Medina Township, Lenawee County, Michigan - north
- Seneca Township, Lenawee County, Michigan - northeast
- Chesterfield Township - east
- Dover Township - southeast corner
- Franklin Township - south
- Mill Creek Township, Williams County - west
- Wright Township, Hillsdale County, Michigan - northwest

The village of Fayette is located in central Gorham Township.

== Name and history ==
It is the only Gorham Township statewide.

== Government ==
The township is governed by a three-member board of trustees, who are elected in November of odd-numbered years to a four-year term beginning on the following January 1. Two are elected in the year after the presidential election and one is elected in the year before it. There is also an elected township fiscal officer, who serves a four-year term beginning on April 1 of the year after the election, which is held in November of the year before the presidential election. Vacancies in the fiscal officership or on the board of trustees are filled by the remaining trustees.

== Attractions ==
Harrison Lake State Park is located in the township.

== Public services ==
=== Public Schools ===
Students from the township are served by the following public local school district:

- Fayette Local School District

=== Mail ===
Mail is delivered in the township by the following U.S. Post Office locations:

- Fayette, Ohio 43521
- West Unity, Ohio 43570

=== Telephone ===
Most of the township lies within the Fayette telephone exchange, which is served by Frontier North, with telephone numbers using the following Numbering Plan Codes:

- 419-237
- 419-500
- 567-404

An eastern portion of the township is part of the Chesterfield telephone exchange, which is served by Windstream Ohio, with telephone numbers using the following code:

- 419-452

A small southeastern area is served by the Wauseon exchange, which is provided by UTO (United Telephone Company of Ohio,) doing business as CenturyLink, with the following codes:

- 419-330
- 419-335
- 419-337
- 419-388
- 419-404
- 419-583
- 419-590

=== Electric ===
Toledo Edison and Midwest Energy Cooperative serves the township with electricity.

=== Highways ===
- US 20
- US 127
- SR 66
