= Kunkle, Ohio =

- CDP
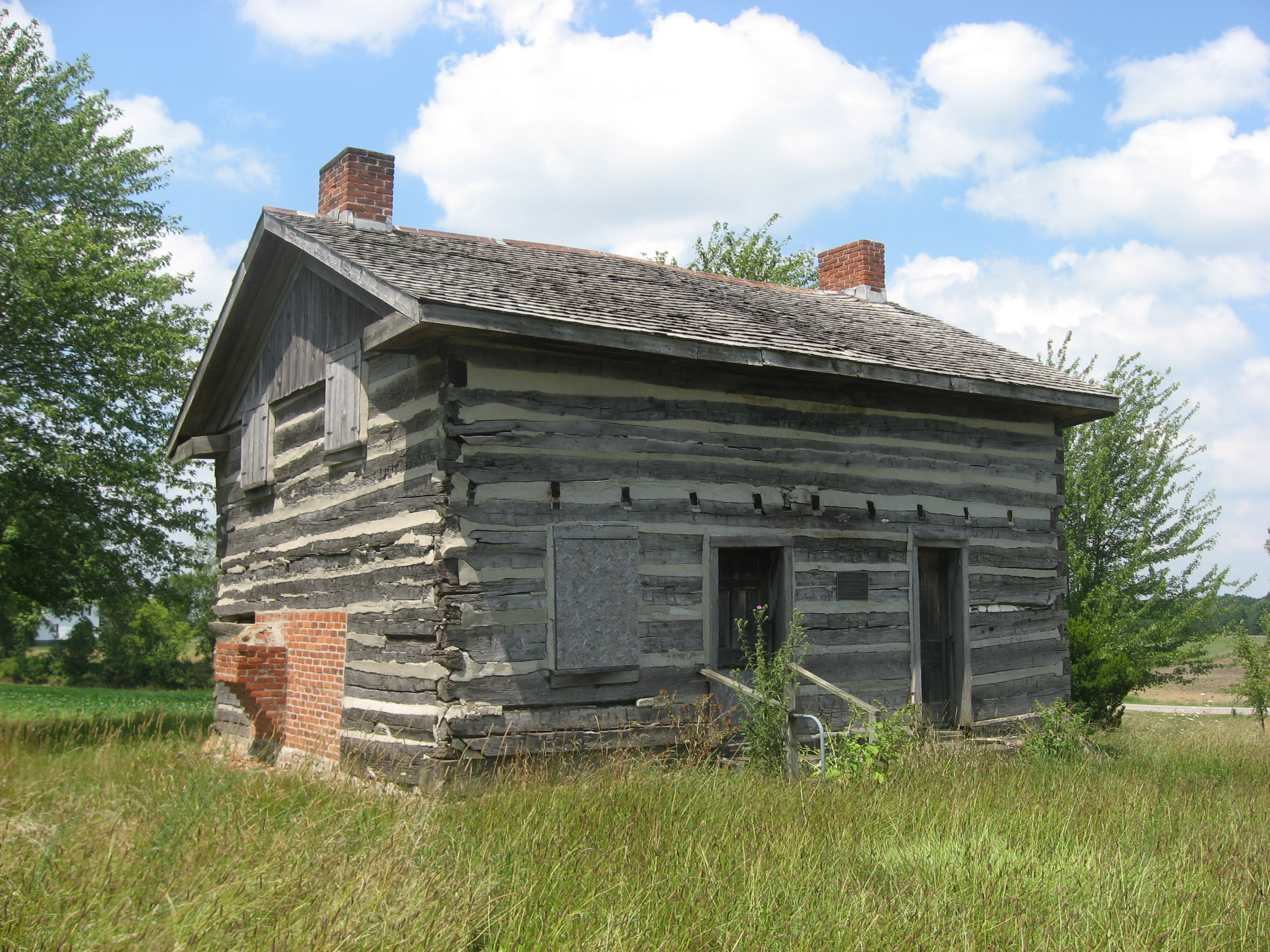
- The Kunkle Log House, built in 1838

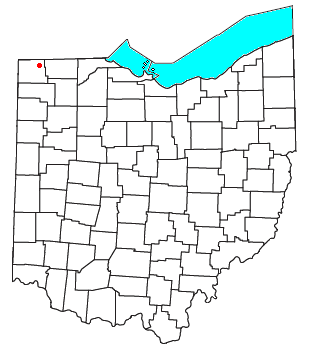
- Location of Kunkle, Ohio
- Coordinates: 41°38′12″N 84°29′43″W
- Country: United States
- State: Ohio
- County: Williams
- Township: Madison
- Elevation: 883 ft (269 m)

Population (2020)
  - Total: 173
- Time zone: UTC-5 (Eastern (EST))
  - Summer (DST): UTC-4 (EDT)
- ZIP code: 43531
- GNIS feature ID: 2628912

Kunkle is a census-designated place in southeastern Madison Township, Williams County, Ohio, United States. It is located approximately 60 miles (97 km) west of Toledo. The population was 173 at the 2020 census.

It has a post office with the ZIP code 43531.

== History ==
Kunkle was not officially platted. A post office called Kunkle has been in operation since 1880.
