= Jasper, Michigan =

- Census-designated place (CDP) & unincorporated community
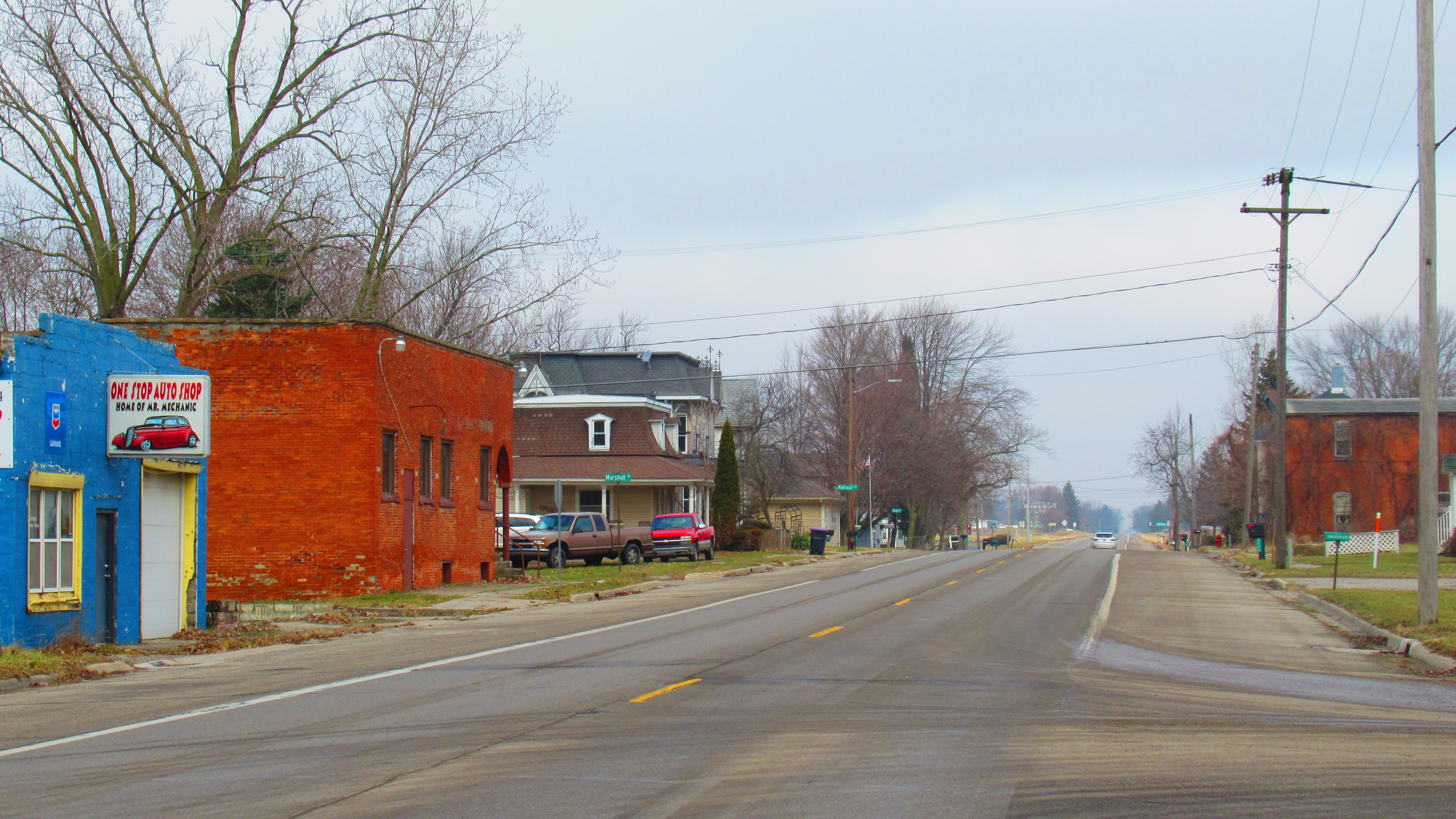
- Looking north along S. Adrian Highway (M-52)

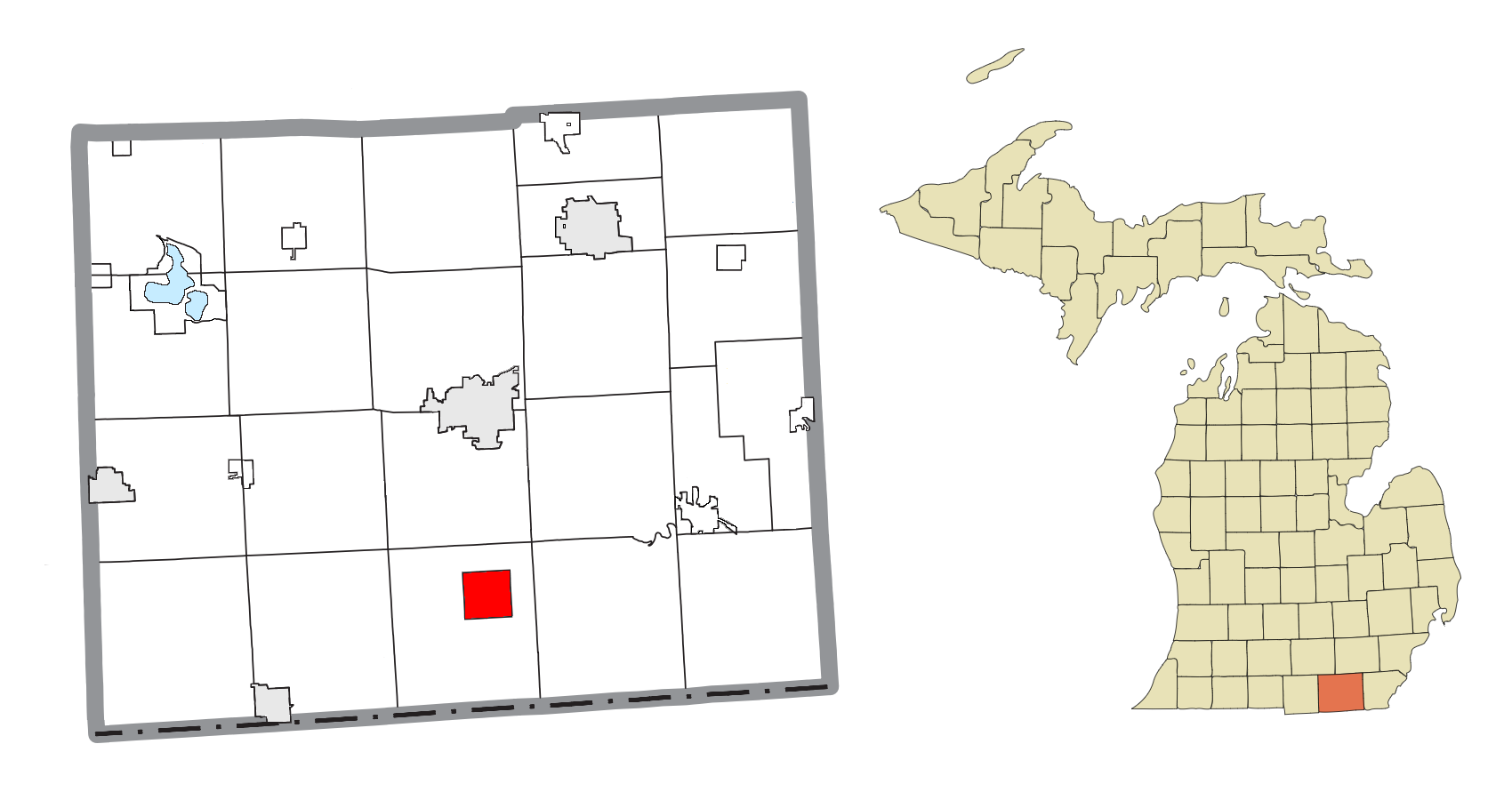
- Location within Lenawee County

- Location within the state of Michigan Location within the United States
- Coordinates: 41°47′36″N 84°02′26″W
- Country: United States
- State: Michigan
- County: Lenawee
- Townships: Fairfield Ogden
- Established: 1874

Area
  - Total: 4.03 sq mi (10.44 km^{2})
  - Land: 4.03 sq mi (10.44 km^{2})
  - Water: 0 sq mi (0.00 km^{2})
- Elevation: 735 ft (224 m)

Population (2020)
  - Total: 371
  - Density: 92.06/sq mi (35.54/km^{2})
- Time zone: UTC-5 (Eastern (EST))
  - Summer (DST): UTC-4 (EDT)
- ZIP code(s): 49248
- Area code: 517
- GNIS feature ID: 629217

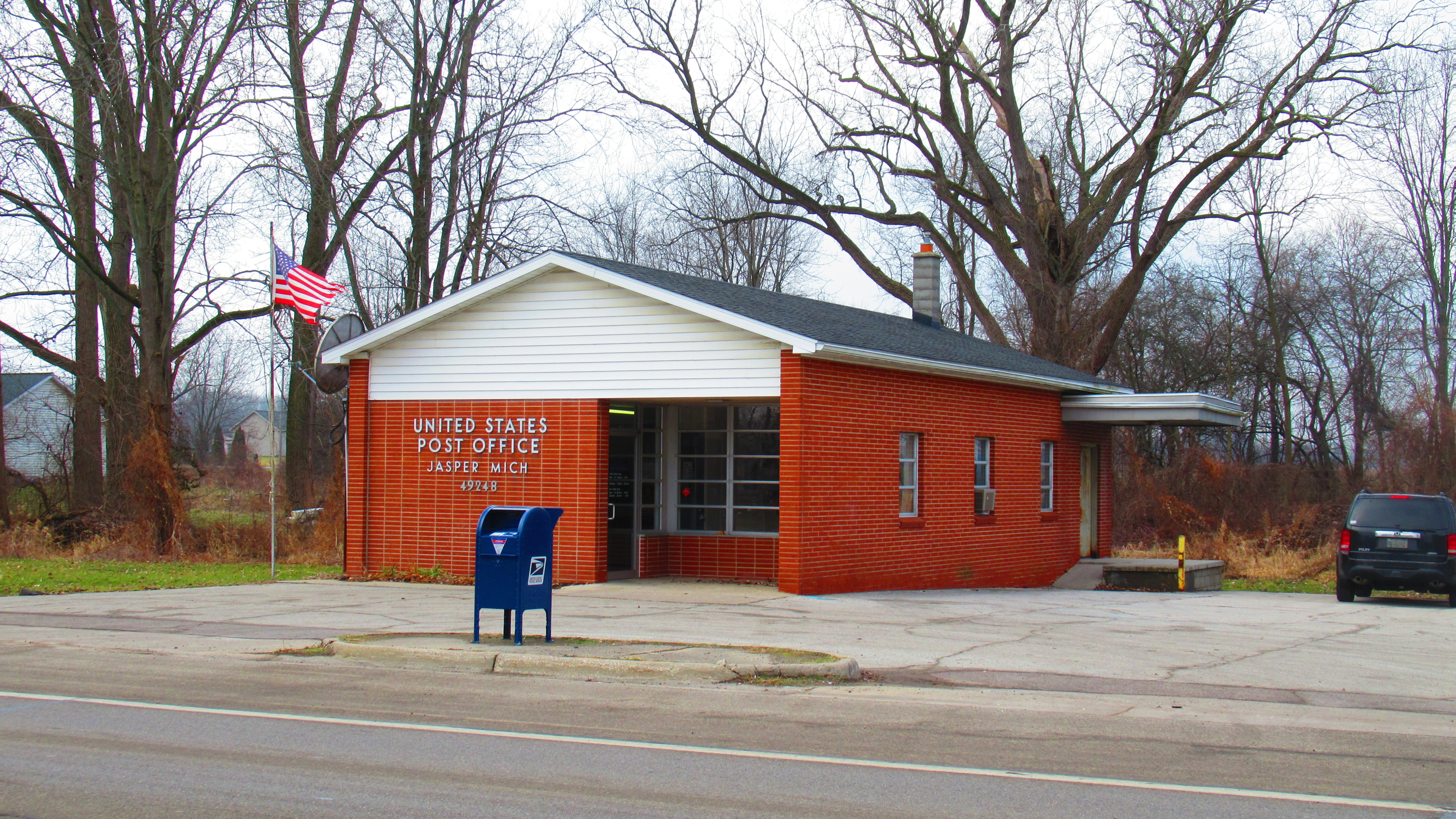
U.S. Post Office in Jasper

Jasper is an unincorporated community and census-designated place (CDP) in Lenawee County in the U.S. state of Michigan. The CDP had a population of 371 at the 2020 census. Jasper is within Fairfield Township and Ogden Township, Jasper has its own post office with the 49248 ZIP Code.

== Geography ==
According to the U.S. Census Bureau, the community has an area of 4.03 square miles (10.44 km^{2}), all of it land.

=== Major highways ===
- M-52 (Adrian Highway) runs south–north through the center of the community.

== History ==
The first European settler in Jasper was Andrew Millet, arriving in 1824. A post office was opened June 18, 1874, with Henry Ferguson as the first postmaster. The Lake Shore and Michigan Southern Railway had a depot in Jasper. The station was at first known as Fairfield. Jasper was one of the largest populated areas in Lenawee County prior to 1908 accounting for about 8,000 residents. A Smallpox epidemic wiped out over half of the residents and most of the homes were burned to the ground in the southern two-thirds of the town to try to stop the epidemic.

The community of Jasper was listed as a newly organized census-designated place for the 2010 census, meaning it now has officially defined boundaries and population statistics for the first time.

== Demographics ==
Historical population
Census	Pop.	Note	%±
2010	412		—
2020	371		−10.0%
U.S. Decennial Census
