= Morenci branch =

Railway line in Michigan and Ohio

Overview
- Termini: Grosvenor, Michigan; Fayette, Ohio

History
- Opened: July 4, 1872
- Closed: 1991

Technical
- Line length: 25.21 mi (40.57 km)
- Track gauge: 1,435 mm (4 ft 8 1/2 in) standard gauge

The Morenci branch or Fayette branch was a railway line in the states of Michigan and Ohio. It ran 25.21 miles (40.57 km) from Grosvenor, near Blissfield, Michigan, to Fayette, Ohio. It was built by the Chicago and Canada Southern Railway in 1872 as part of abortive attempt to construct a new through route between Southern Ontario and Chicago. The branch became part of the Lake Shore and Michigan Southern Railway system, and from there passed on to the New York Central Railroad and Penn Central. Following the Penn Central's bankruptcy, the state of Michigan acquired the line and abandoned it in 1991.

== History ==
The Canada Southern Railway incorporated the Chicago and Canada Southern Railway in 1871 to build west from the Detroit River toward Chicago. Construction began in 1872. On July 4, 1872, the line was opened between the Lake Shore and Michigan Southern Railway's (LS&MS) main line at "Grosvenor" (near Blissfield, Michigan) and Fayette, Ohio. It was completed between Grosvenor and Grosse Ile on November 13, 1873. Plans to build further west from Fayette were never realized.

The LS&MS leased the Chicago and Canada Southern Railway in November 1879 and reorganized it as the Detroit and Chicago Railroad on September 25, 1888. The line north of Grosvenor was redundant and abandonments and sales followed. By 1897, the line between Grosvenor and Fayette was the only portion of the Chicago and Canada Southern Railway that remained under LS&MS control. The LS&MS was one of a dozen companies consolidated in 1914 to create the modern New York Central Railroad. The New York Central abandoned the western 6.6 miles (10.6 km) between Fayette and Morenci, Michigan, in 1941.

Penn Central, successor to the New York Central Railroad, entered bankruptcy in 1970. Ownership of the line remained with the reorganized Penn Central estate. The final system plan of the United States Railway Association classified the line as "light density" and it was not conveyed to Conrail. Conrail operated the line under subsidy. The Lenawee County Railroad succeeded Conrail as the designated operator of the line on April 1, 1978. Penn Central abandoned the line between Grosvenor and Weston, Michigan, in 1982. Access to the branch was via the Detroit, Toledo and Ironton Railroad's Tecumseh branch, which connected at "Bimo", west of Weston. The state of Michigan acquired the remainder of the branch on February 15, 1984. The Lenawee County Railroad ceased operations on September 30, 1990. The state abandoned the branch in 1991.
