= Jefferson Township, Williams County, Ohio =

Township in Ohio, US

- Township
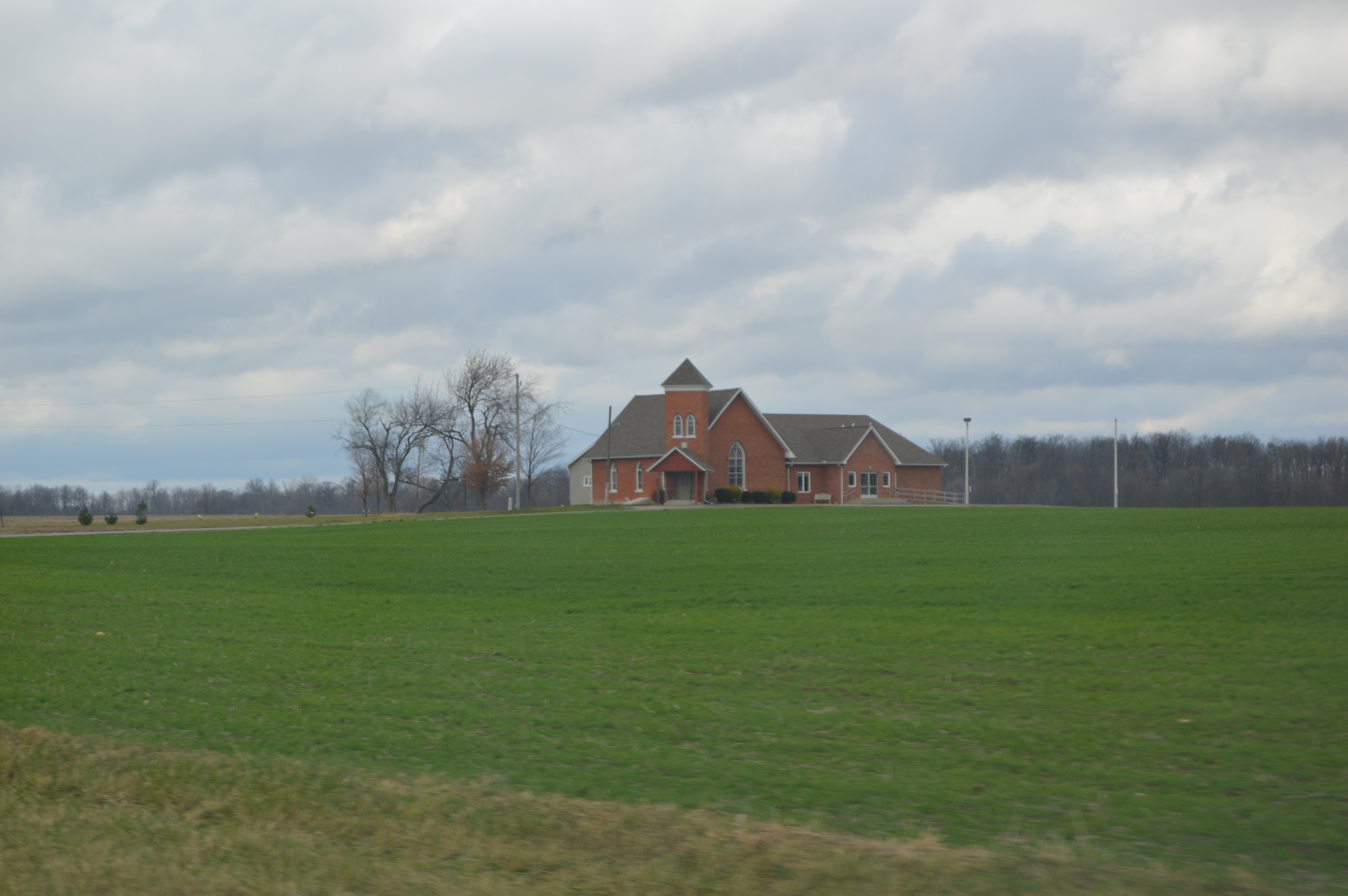
- Pleasant Ridge Dunkard Brethren Church, southeast of Holiday City

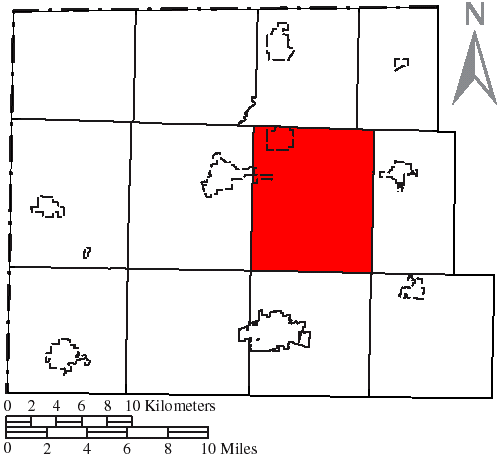
- Location of Jefferson Township in Williams County
- Coordinates: 41°34′9″N 84°31′22″W
- Country: United States
- State: Ohio
- County: Williams

Area
  - Total: 42.7 sq mi (110.5 km^{2})
  - Land: 42.6 sq mi (110.3 km^{2})
  - Water: 0.077 sq mi (0.2 km^{2})
- Elevation: 781 ft (238 m)

Population (2020)
  - Total: 1,814
  - Density: 42/sq mi (16.4/km^{2})
- Time zone: UTC-5 (Eastern (EST))
  - Summer (DST): UTC-4 (EDT)
- FIPS code: 39-38864
- GNIS feature ID: 1087170

Jefferson Township is one of the twelve townships of Williams County, Ohio, United States. The 2020 census found 1,814 people in the township.

== Geography ==
Located in the central part of the county, it borders the following townships:

- Madison Township - north
- Mill Creek Township - northeast
- Brady Township - east
- Springfield Township - southeast corner
- Pulaski Township - south
- Center Township - southwest
- Superior Township - west

It is one of only two county townships (the other being Superior Township) without a border on another county.

The villages of Holiday City, the smallest village in Williams County, is located in northwestern Jefferson Township, as is a small part of the village of Montpelier.

== Name and history ==
Jefferson Township was named for Thomas Jefferson, 3rd President of the United States. It is one of twenty-four Jefferson Townships statewide.

== Government ==
The township is governed by a three-member board of trustees, who are elected in November of odd-numbered years to a four-year term beginning on the following January 1. Two are elected in the year after the presidential election and one is elected in the year before it. There is also an elected township fiscal officer, who serves a four-year term beginning on April 1 of the year after the election, which is held in November of the year before the presidential election. Vacancies in the fiscal officership or on the board of trustees are filled by the remaining trustees.
