= Ogden Township, Michigan =

- Civil township
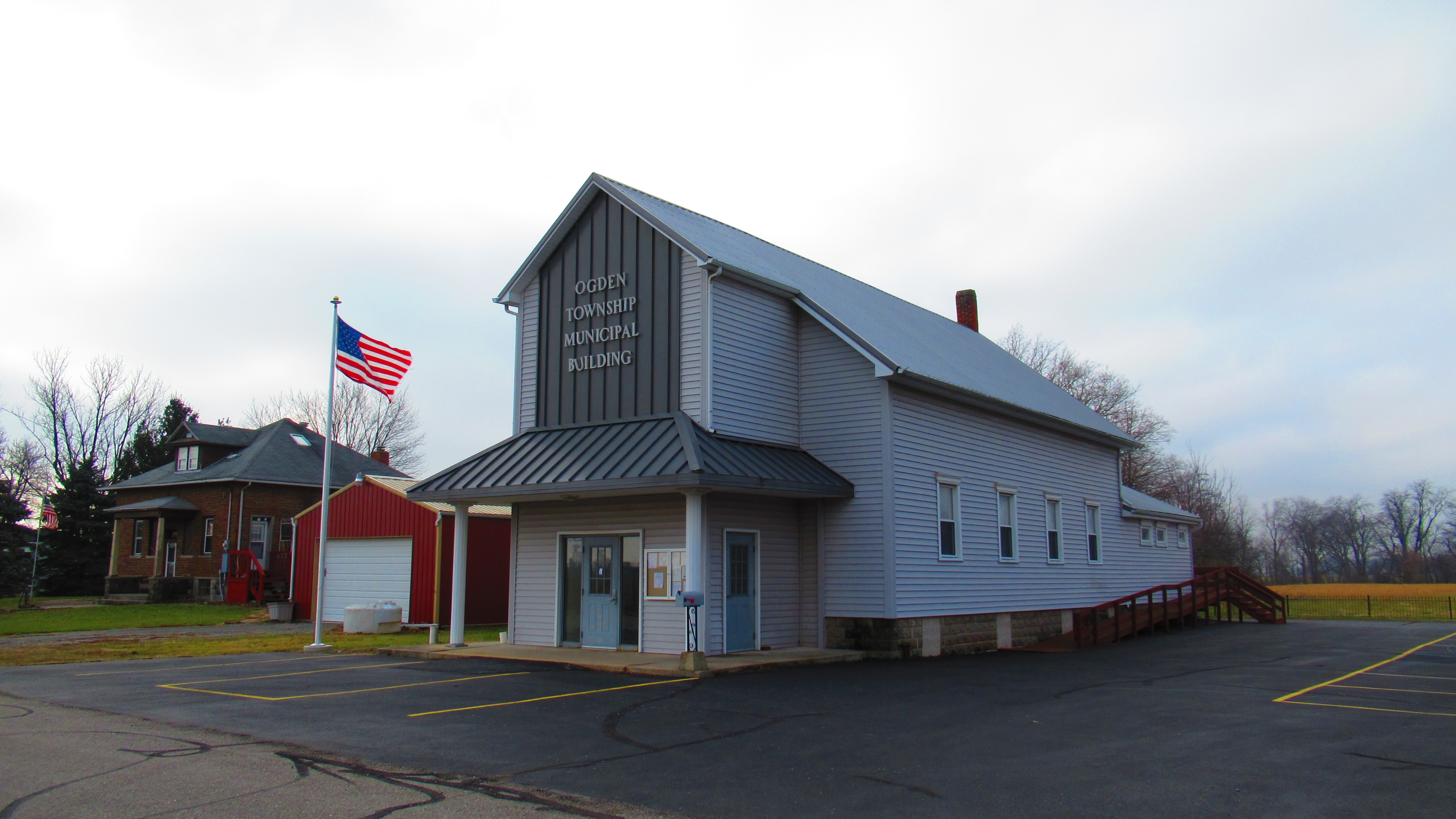
- Ogden Township Municipal Building

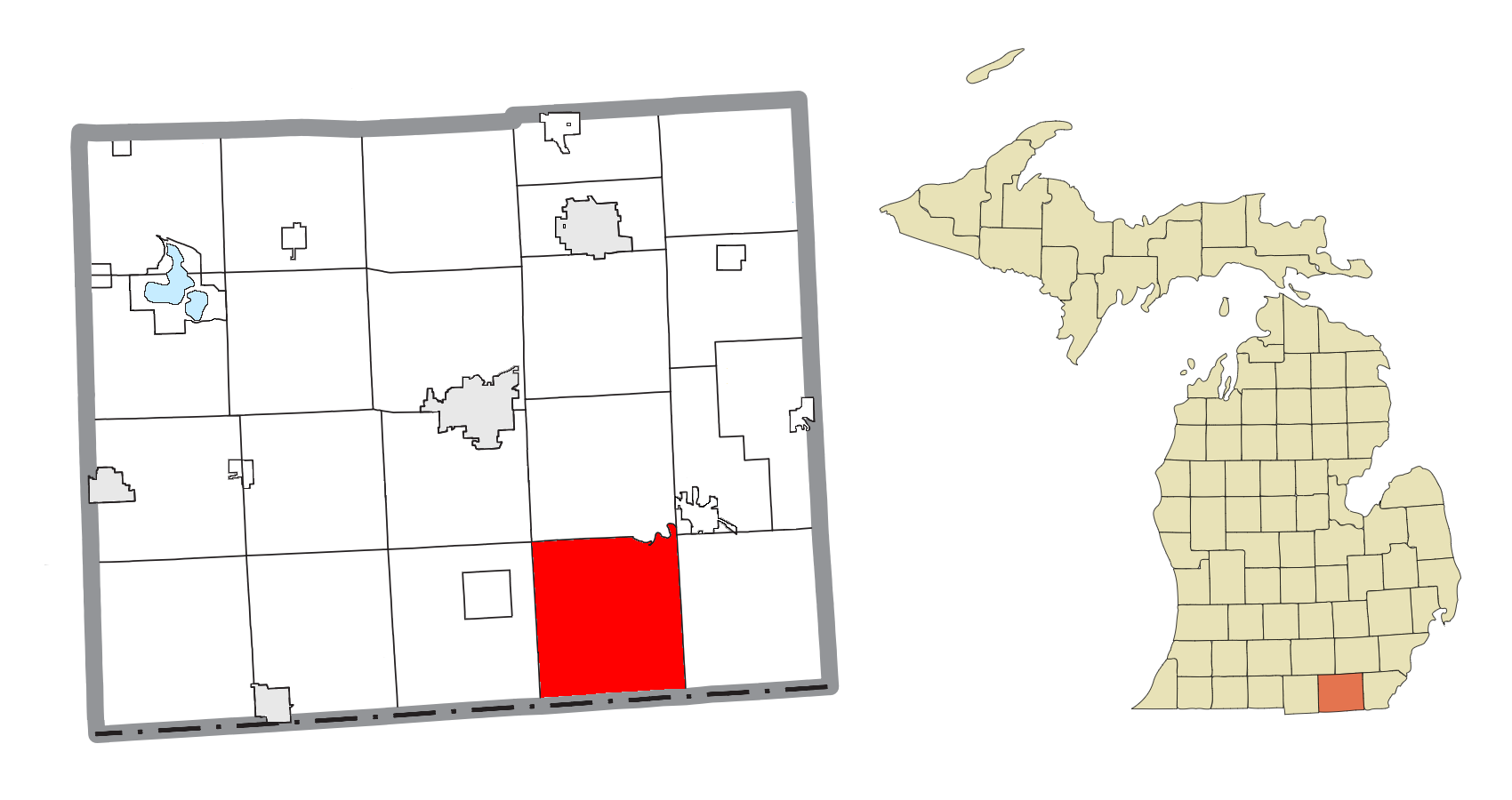
- Location within Lenawee County

- Location within the state of Michigan Ogden Township (the United States)
- Coordinates: 41°45′45″N 83°56′49″W
- Country: United States
- State: Michigan
- County: Lenawee

Government
  - Supervisor: Joshua Van Camp
  - Clerk: Leandra Bryan

Area
  - Total: 42.0 sq mi (108.7 km^{2})
  - Land: 42.0 sq mi (108.7 km^{2})
  - Water: 0 sq mi (0.0 km^{2})
- Elevation: 705 ft (215 m)

Population (2020)
  - Total: 913
  - Density: 21.8/sq mi (8.40/km^{2})
- Time zone: UTC-5 (Eastern (EST))
  - Summer (DST): UTC-4 (EDT)
- ZIP code(s): 49228 (Blissfield); 49248 (Jasper)
- Area code: 517
- FIPS code: 26-60260
- GNIS feature ID: 1626838
- Website: https://www.ogdentownship.com

Ogden Township is a civil township of Lenawee County in the U.S. state of Michigan. The population was 913 as of the 2020 census.

== Geography ==
According to the United States Census Bureau, the township has a total area of 42.0 square miles (109 km^{2}), all land.

== Communities ==
- East Ogden was the name of a post office in the township from 1843 until 1867.

== Demographics ==
As of the census of 2000, there were 1,063 people, 381 households, and 307 families residing in the township. The population density was 25.3 per square mile (9.8/km^{2}). There were 399 housing units at an average density of 9.5 per square mile (3.7/km^{2}). The racial makeup of the township was 97.55% White, 0.94% African American, 0.75% Native American, 0.09% Pacific Islander, 0.47% from other races, and 0.19% from two or more races. Hispanic or Latino of any race were 2.45% of the population.

There were 381 households, out of which 34.9% had children under the age of 18 living with them, 71.4% were married couples living together, 5.2% had a female householder with no husband present, and 19.2% were non-families. 17.3% of all households were made up of individuals, and 7.3% had someone living alone who was 65 years of age or older. The average household size was 2.79 and the average family size was 3.12.

In the township the population was spread out in terms of age, with 26.7% under the age of 18, 8.7% from 18 to 24, 26.7% from 25 to 44, 26.2% from 45 to 64, and 11.7% 65 years of age or older. The median age was 39 years. For every 100 females, there were 108.8 males. For every 100 females age 18 and over, there were 106.6 males.

The median income for a household in the township was $51,250, and the median income for a family was $56,023. Males had a median income of $39,063 versus $27,375 for females. The per capita income for the township was $22,545. About 3.9% of the families and 4.0% of the population were below the poverty line, including 3.6% of those under age 18 and 3.6% of those age 65 or over.
