= Brady Township, Ohio =

Township in Ohio, US

- Township
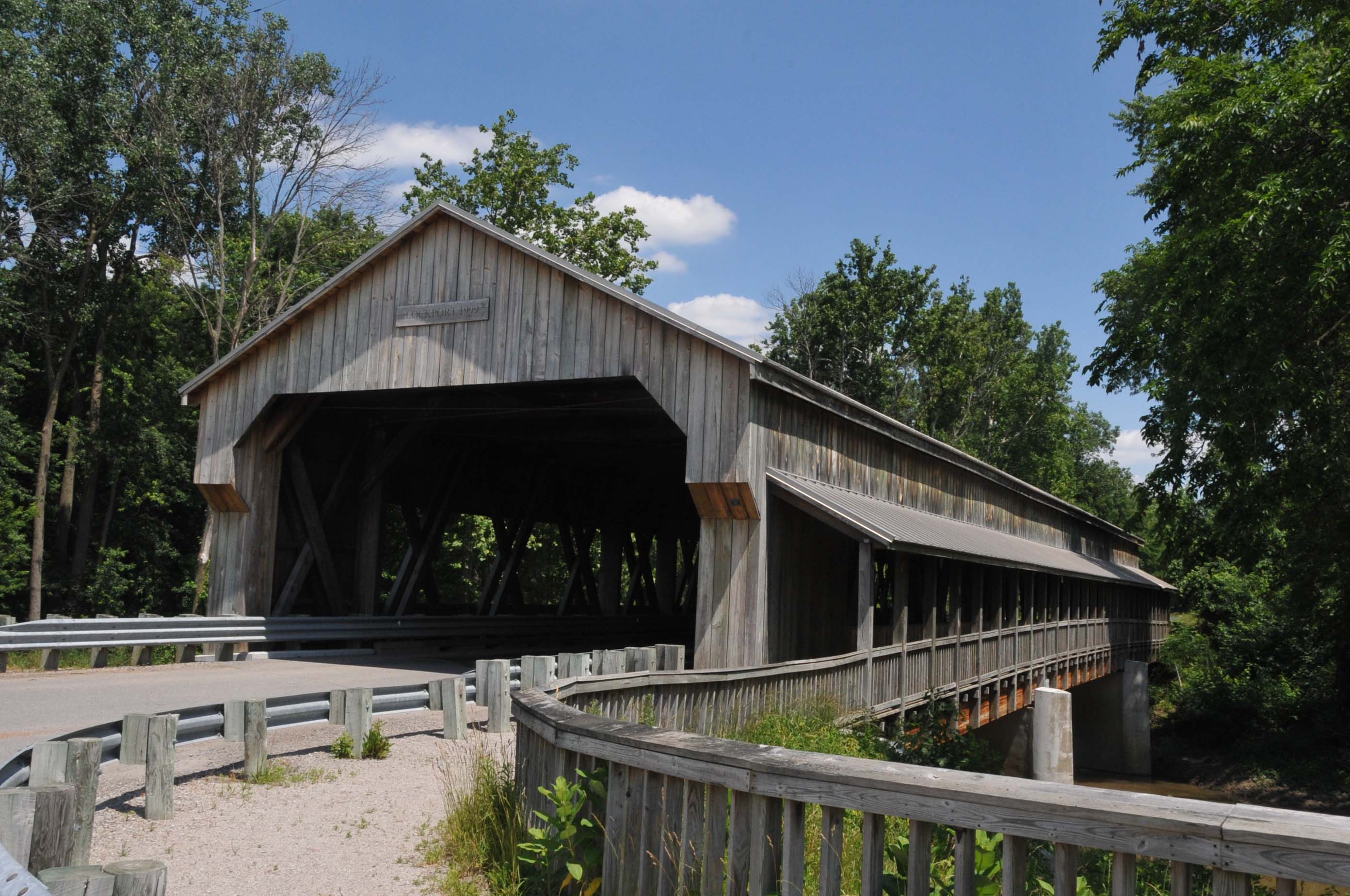
- A covered bridge in the township

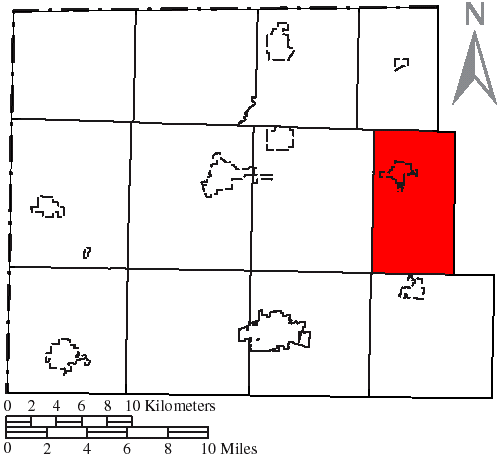
- Location of Brady Township in Williams County
- Coordinates: 41°34′11″N 84°25′19″W
- Country: United States
- State: Ohio
- County: Williams

Area
  - Total: 28.6 sq mi (74.2 km^{2})
  - Land: 28.6 sq mi (74.2 km^{2})
  - Water: 0 sq mi (0.0 km^{2})
- Elevation: 768 ft (234 m)

Population (2020)
  - Total: 2,621
  - Density: 91.5/sq mi (35.3/km^{2})
- Time zone: UTC-5 (Eastern (EST))
  - Summer (DST): UTC-4 (EDT)
- FIPS code: 39-08140
- GNIS feature ID: 1087165

Brady Township is one of the twelve townships of Williams County, Ohio, United States. The 2020 census found 2,621 people in the township.

== Geography ==
Located in the eastern part of the county, it borders the following townships:

- Mill Creek Township - north
- Franklin Township, Fulton County - northeast
- German Township, Fulton County - east
- Springfield Township - south
- Pulaski Township - southwest corner
- Jefferson Township - west

The village of West Unity is located in central Brady Township.

== Name and history ==
Brady Township bears the name of one Captain Brady, a pioneer settler. It is the only Brady Township statewide. The first settlement at Brady Township was made in 1834.

== Government ==
The township is governed by a three-member board of trustees, who are elected in November of odd-numbered years to a four-year term beginning on the following January 1. Two are elected in the year after the presidential election and one is elected in the year before it. There is also an elected township clerk, who serves a four-year term beginning on April 1 of the year after the election, which is held in November of the year before the presidential election. Vacancies in the clerkship or on the board of trustees are filled by the remaining trustees.
