= Harrison Lake State Park =

Park in Ohio, USA

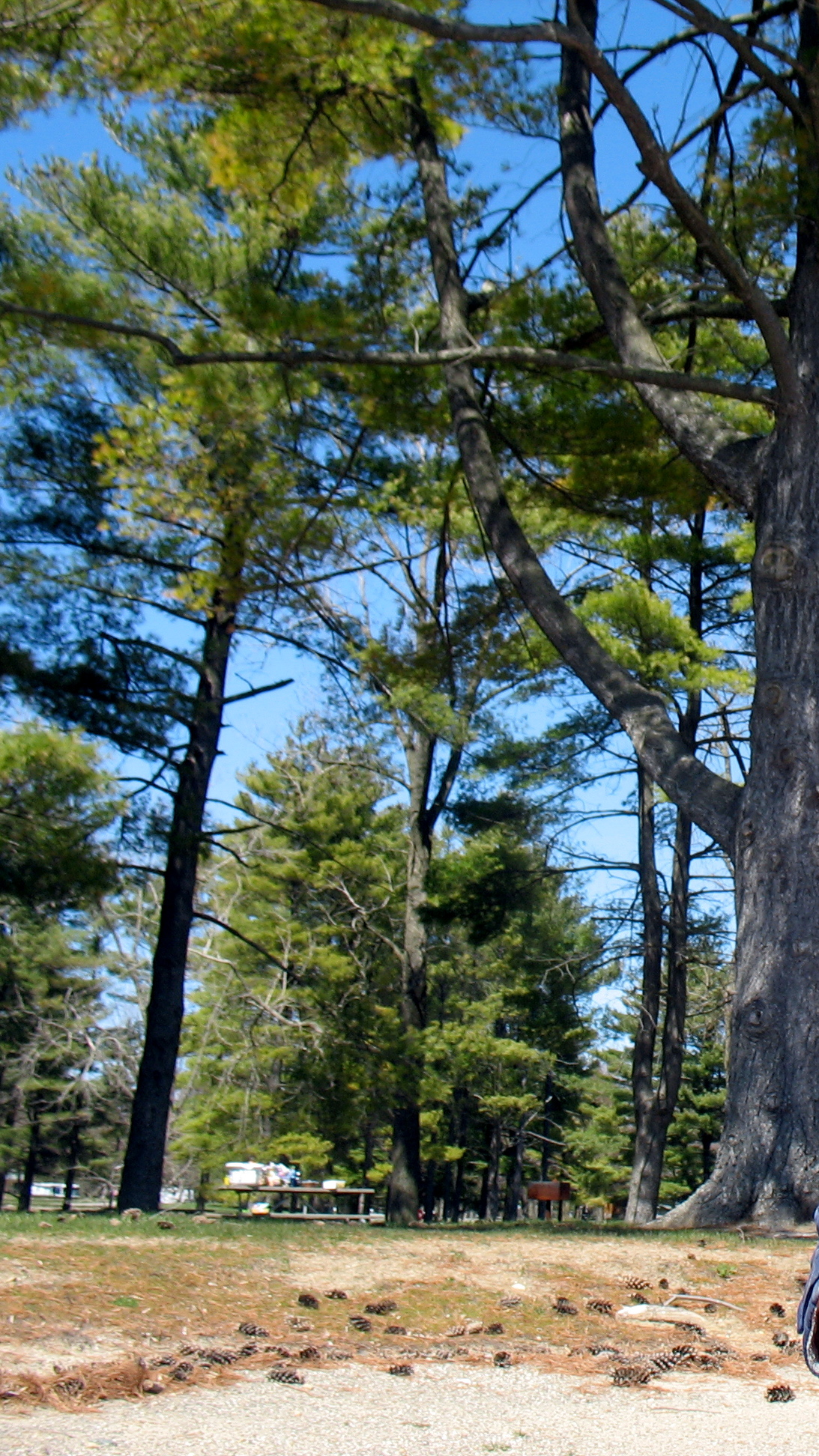
- Picnic grove

- Location within Ohio Location within the United States
- Location: Fulton County, Ohio, United States
- Coordinates: 41°38′37″N 84°22′20″W
- Area: 142 acres (57 ha)
- Elevation: 774 ft (236 m)
- Established: 1950
- Administrator: Ohio Department of Natural Resources
- Designation: Ohio state park
- Website: Harrison Lake State Park

Harrison Lake State Park is a 142-acre (57 ha) public recreation area located three miles (4.8 km) southwest of Fayette, Ohio, in the United States. The park surrounds 95-acre (38 ha) Harrison Lake, which has a maximum depth of fifteen feet near the dam and provides a habitat for bluegill, channel catfish, largemouth bass, white crappie, and bullhead. The state park includes a 3.5-mile (5.6 km) hiking trail around the lake, swimming beach, and camping area.

== History ==
Harrison Lake was created with the damming of Mill Creek, a tributary of the Tiffin River, in 1939. The property was turned over to the Ohio Department of Natural Resources for development of a state park in 1950.
