= Fayette High School (Ohio) =

Location
- 400 East Gamble Road; Fayette, (Fulton County), Ohio 43521; United States; 41°39′56″N 84°19′20″W

Information
- Type: Public, Coeducational high school
- Motto: Following the journey of learning to educational excellence
- School district: Fayette Local School District
- Superintendent: Anji Belcher
- Headmaster: John Molter
- Teaching staff: 16.45 (FTE)
- Grades: 7-12
- Student to teacher ratio: 8.45
- Colors: Purple and Gold
- Athletics conference: Buckeye Border Conference
- Sports: Basketball, Volleyball, Golf, Cross-Country, Track & Field, Baseball, Softball
- Mascot: Eagle
- Team name: Eagles
- Website: https://www.fayettesch.org/junior-highhigh-school

Fayette Local Schools is a public K-12 school in Fayette, Ohio, United States. It is the only school in the Fayette Local School District. The mascot is the Eagle. The school is a member of the Buckeye Border Conference. GFHS is a small rural school in Fulton County.

== History ==
The old high school building, located north of the community park and the Normal Memorial Library on Eagle Street, was originally the Fayette Normal College of Business and Music and was established in 1882. The old high school was established in 1929, with additions being built in 1953, 1973, and 1997. The building finished its 80th year before the district moved into a new multimillion-dollar building at the south edge of town. The Franklin elementary building was established in 1937 and became a part of the Fayette school system in 1968. Before the move in Fall 2008, the old high school housed grades 7-12 and the Franklin building housed K-6. The district is now in one K-12 school building located at 400 East Gamble Road in Fayette.

On August 26, 2008, board of education members voted to drop the word "Gorham" from the name of the school. It is now known as the Fayette Local School District.

- Fayette History Page

== School motto ==
The motto of Fayette High School is to "Do it the Eagle Way." Doing it the Eagle Way means to: 1-Do What's Right; 2-Do The Best You Can; 3-Treat Others Like You Want To Be Treated

== Athletics ==
Athletics at Fayette include Archery, Basketball, Volleyball, Baseball, Track, Cross Country, Soft Ball and Golf and Cheerleading

== New school building ==
Due to contamination issues from a local factory, the school district is now in a new K-12 school building. The $18.2 million school officially opened for the 2008/2009 school year after a dedication ceremony for the community on August 17, 2008. The new school features cutting edge technology and much more space than the previous school buildings. The old high school and elementary buildings have since been demolished.

== Notable alumni ==
- Pam Borton, Head women's basketball coach at the University of Minnesota
- Calvin Case, American Orthodontist in early 1900s
