= Fairfield Township, Lenawee County, Michigan =

Fairfield Township, Michigan
- Civil township
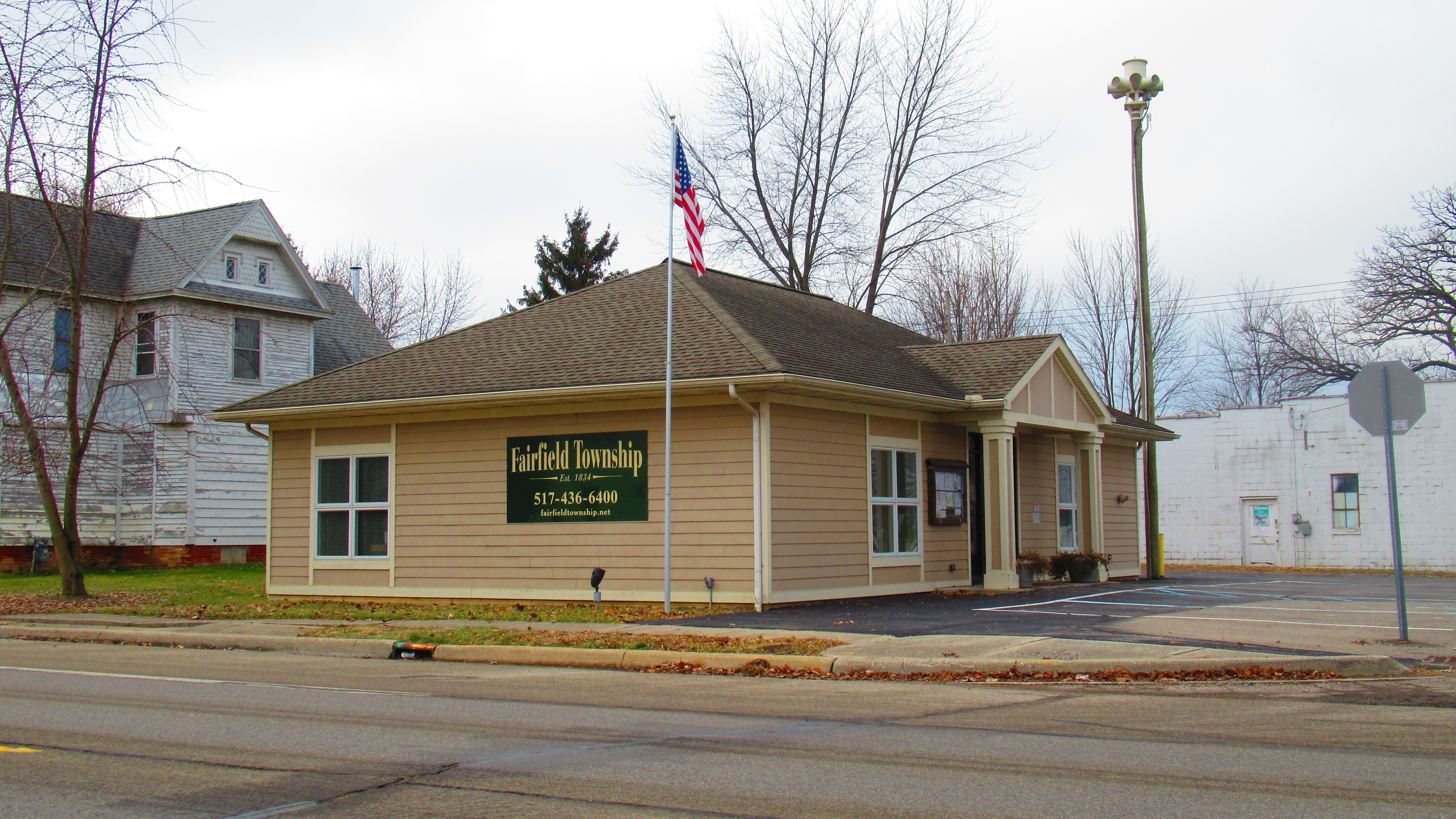
- Fairfield Township Hall in Jasper

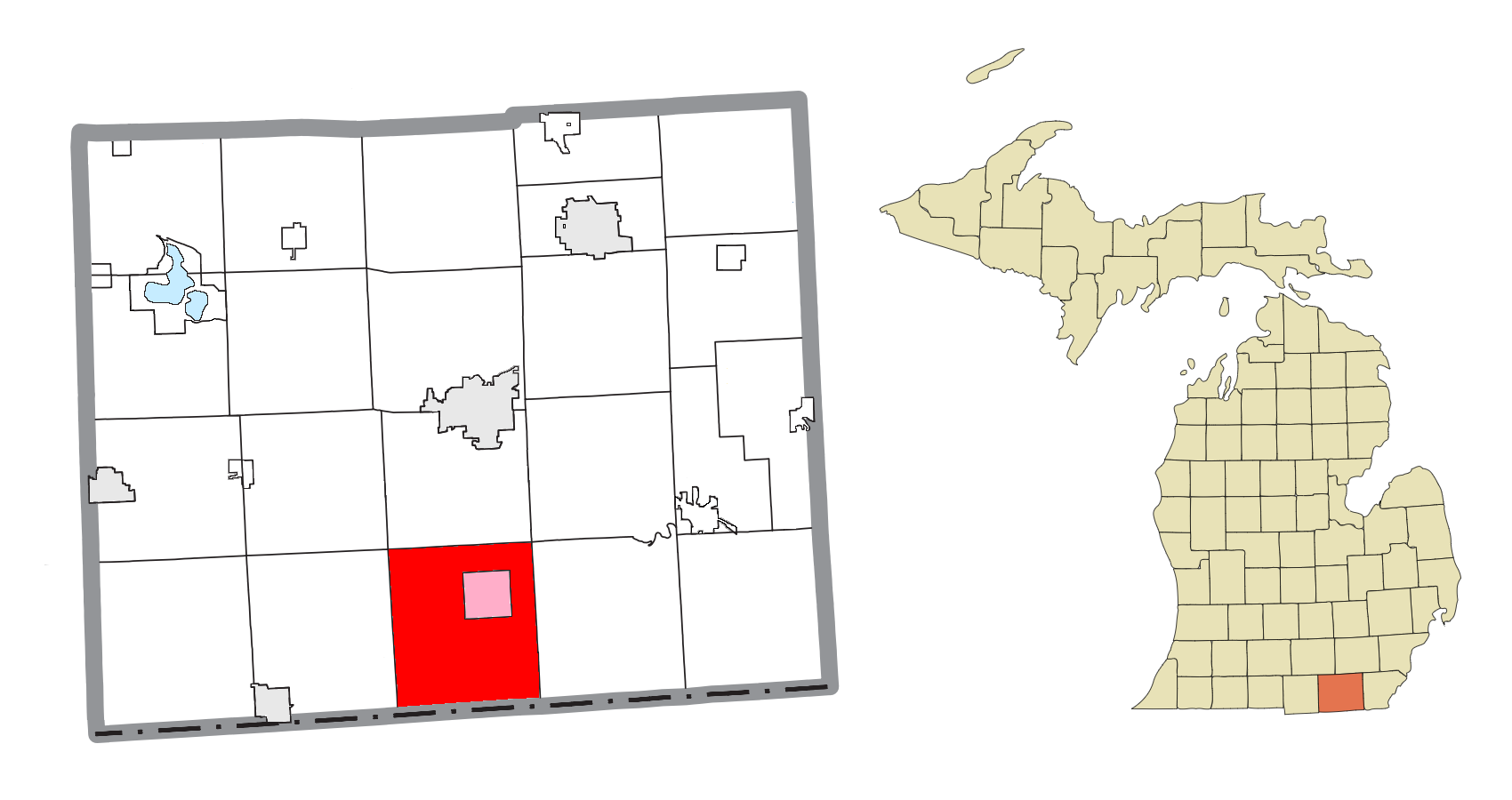
- Location within Lenawee County (red) and the administered community of Jasper (pink)

- Location within the state of Michigan Fairfield Township (the United States)
- Coordinates: 41°46′41″N 84°04′08″W
- Country: United States
- State: Michigan
- County: Lenawee

Government
  - Supervisor: Chris McCallister
  - Clerk: Debra Keller

Area
  - Total: 42.0 sq mi (108.7 km^{2})
  - Land: 42.0 sq mi (108.7 km^{2})
  - Water: 0 sq mi (0.0 km^{2})
- Elevation: 750 ft (230 m)

Population (2020)
  - Total: 1,661
  - Density: 39.58/sq mi (15.28/km^{2})
- Time zone: UTC-5 (Eastern (EST))
  - Summer (DST): UTC-4 (EDT)
- ZIP code(s): 49221 (Adrian); 49248 (Jasper); 49256 (Morenci); 49279 (Sand Creek); 49289 (Weston)
- Area code: 517
- FIPS code: 26-27020
- GNIS feature ID: 1626263
- Website: fairfieldtwplenaweemi.gov

Fairfield Township is a civil township of Lenawee County in the U.S. state of Michigan. As of the 2020 census, the township population was 1,661.

== Communities ==
- Fairfield is an unincorporated community at the junction of M-52 and Fairfield Road at 41°48′46″N 84°02′28″W. It was first known as Baker's Corners after the brothers Moses, Orin, and Joseph Baker bought land here in 1831–32. A post office named Baker's opened January 29, 1835, with Orrin Baker as the first postmaster. It was renamed to Fairfield after the township on April 13, 1842. The post office was discontinued July 15, 1921.
- Jasper is an unincorporated community on M-52 approximately one mile south of Fairfield at 41°47′36″N 84°02′26″W. The first European settler was Andrew Millet, arriving in 1824. A post office was opened June 18, 1874, with Henry Ferguson as the first postmaster. The ZIP code for the Jasper post office is 49248. The Lake Shore and Michigan Southern Railway had a depot in Jasper on its Morenci branch. The station was at first known as Fairfield.
- Ridgeville is a historical locale at the junction of Arnold Highway and E. Ridgeville Road at 41°45′26″N 84°01′18″W. A post office opened December 9, 1898, and operated until November 29, 1902.
- Weston is an unincorporated community at the junction of Sand Creek Highway and W. Weston Road at 41°46′13″N 84°05′52″W. Ezra Cole was the first European settler of Weston in 1835. Initially known as Oakford, a post office opened with that name on July 27, 1854, with Northright Knapp as the first postmaster. On June 15, 1869, the post office was renamed Weston after professional pedestrian Edward Payson Weston. The ZIP code for the Weston post office is 49289. The Lake Shore and Michigan Southern Railway had a depot in Weston.

== Geography ==
According to the United States Census Bureau, the township has a total area of 42.0 square miles (108.7 km^{2}), all land.

== Demographics ==
As of the census of 2000, there were 1,756 people, 621 households, and 481 families residing in the township. The population density was 41.8 inhabitants per square mile (16.1/km^{2}). There were 666 housing units at an average density of 15.9 per square mile (6.1/km^{2}). The racial makeup of the township was 97.49% White, 0.11% African American, 0.57% Native American, 0.06% Asian, 0.63% from other races, and 1.14% from two or more races. Hispanic or Latino of any race were 3.87% of the population.

There were 621 households, out of which 38.0% had children under the age of 18 living with them, 67.8% were married couples living together, 6.4% had a female householder with no husband present, and 22.4% were non-families. 19.5% of all households were made up of individuals, and 9.2% had someone living alone who was 65 years of age or older. The average household size was 2.81 and the average family size was 3.22.

In the township the population was spread out, with 29.4% under the age of 18, 7.7% from 18 to 24, 27.6% from 25 to 44, 24.3% from 45 to 64, and 11.0% who were 65 years of age or older. The median age was 37 years. For every 100 females, there were 99.8 males. For every 100 females age 18 and over, there were 95.1 males.

The median income for a household in the township was $42,900, and the median income for a family was $47,330. Males had a median income of $35,690 versus $24,259 for females. The per capita income for the township was $17,496. About 2.7% of families and 4.8% of the population were below the poverty line, including 6.0% of those under age 18 and 4.2% of those age 65 or over.
