= Fayette, Ohio =

- Village
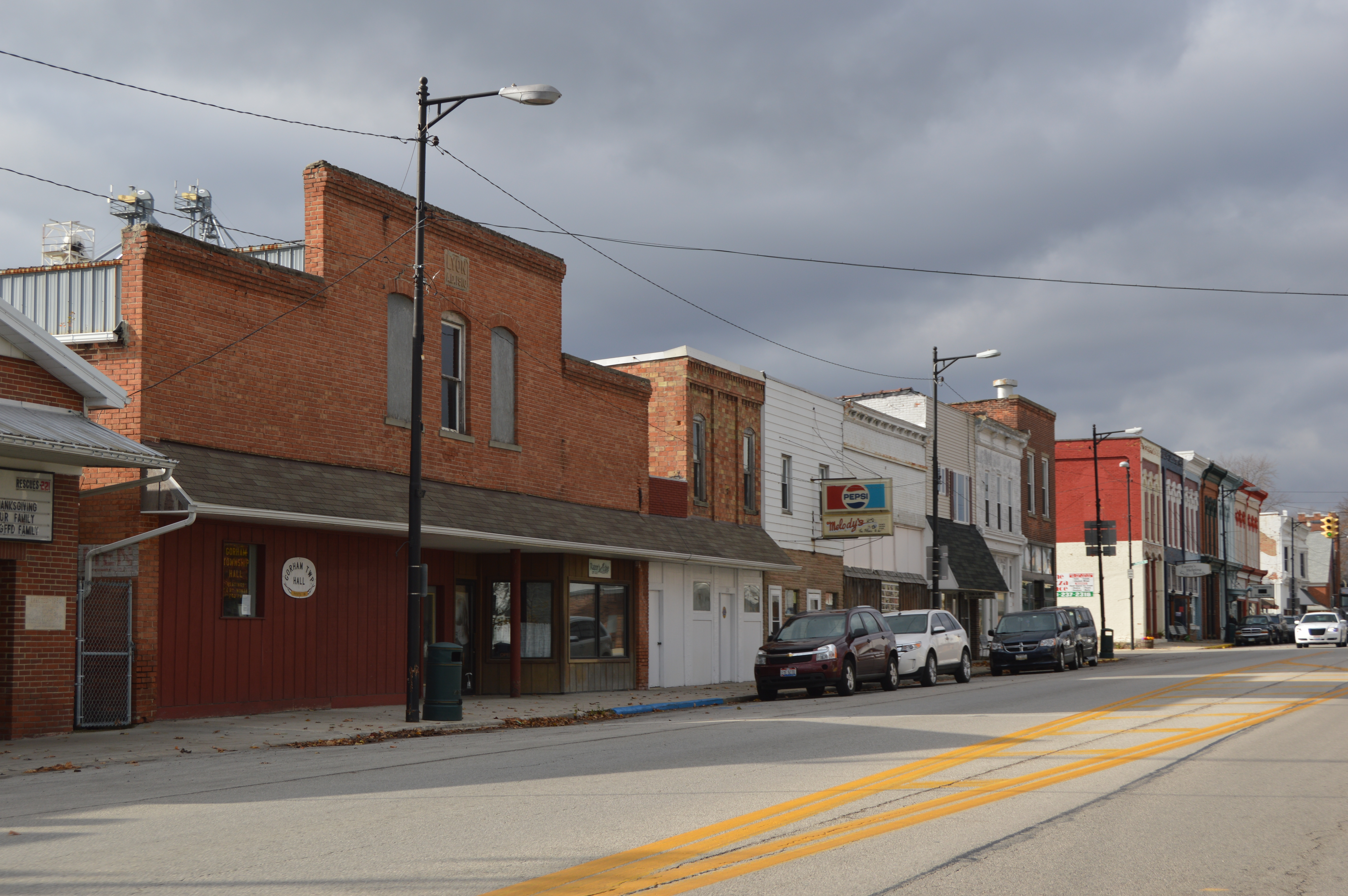
- Main Street downtown

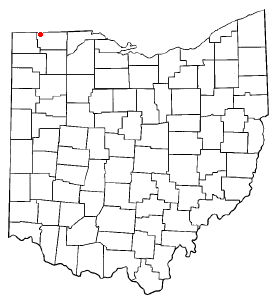
- Location of Fayette, Ohio

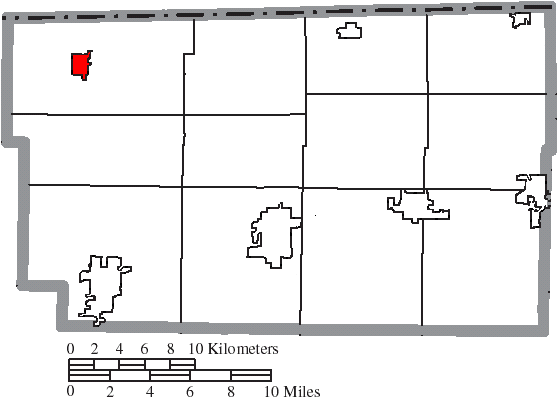
- Location of Fayette in Fulton County
- Coordinates: 41°40′22″N 84°19′42″W
- Country: United States
- State: Ohio
- County: Fulton
- Township: Gorham

Area
  - Total: 0.97 sq mi (2.52 km^{2})
  - Land: 0.97 sq mi (2.52 km^{2})
  - Water: 0 sq mi (0.00 km^{2})
- Elevation: 794 ft (242 m)

Population (2020)
  - Total: 1,305
  - Estimate (2023): 1,285
  - Density: 1,339.3/sq mi (517.11/km^{2})
- Time zone: UTC-5 (Eastern (EST))
  - Summer (DST): UTC-4 (EDT)
- ZIP code: 43521
- Area code: 419
- FIPS code: 39-26768
- GNIS feature ID: 2398867
- Website: www.villageoffayette.com

Fayette is a village in Fulton County, Ohio, United States. The population was 1,305 at the 2020 census.

== History ==
Fayette was incorporated as a village in 1872 when the railroad was extended to that point. A post office called Fayette has been in operation since 1873.

== Geography ==
According to the United States Census Bureau, the village has a total area of 0.98 square miles (2.54 km^{2}), all land.

== Demographics ==
Historical population
Census	Pop.	Note	%±
1880	579		—
1890	890		53.7%
1900	886		−0.4%
1910	915		3.3%
1920	936		2.3%
1930	347		−62.9%
1940	912		162.8%
1950	1,003		10.0%
1960	1,090		8.7%
1970	1,175		7.8%
1980	1,222		4.0%
1990	1,248		2.1%
2000	1,340		7.4%
2010	1,283		−4.3%
2020	1,305		1.7%
2023 (est.)	1,285	▼	−1.5%
U.S. Decennial Census

=== 2010 census ===
As of the census of 2010, there were 1,283 people, 505 households, and 345 families living in the village. The population density was 1,309.2 inhabitants per square mile (505.5/km^{2}). There were 591 housing units at an average density of 603.1 per square mile (232.9/km^{2}). The racial makeup of the village was 94.0% White, 1.0% African American, 0.4% Native American, 0.1% Asian, 2.3% from other races, and 2.2% from two or more races. Hispanic or Latino of any race were 14.3% of the population.

There were 505 households, of which 36.6% had children under the age of 18 living with them, 48.1% were married couples living together, 13.3% had a female householder with no husband present, 6.9% had a male householder with no wife present, and 31.7% were non-families. 26.9% of all households were made up of individuals, and 9.9% had someone living alone who was 65 years of age or older. The average household size was 2.54 and the average family size was 3.04.

The median age in the village was 35.3 years. 28.4% of residents were under the age of 18; 8.9% were between the ages of 18 and 24; 26% were from 25 to 44; 24% were from 45 to 64; and 12.8% were 65 years of age or older. The gender makeup of the village was 47.4% male and 52.6% female.

=== 2000 census ===
As of the census of 2000, there were 1,340 people, 541 households, and 360 families living in the village. The population density was 1,469.1 inhabitants per square mile (567.2/km^{2}). There were 569 housing units at an average density of 623.8 per square mile (240.9/km^{2}). The racial makeup of the village was 94.48% White, 0.15% African American, 0.30% Native American, 3.58% from other races, and 1.49% from two or more races. Hispanic or Latino of any race were 8.51% of the population.

There were 541 households, out of which 34.2% had children under the age of 18 living with them, 49.9% were married couples living together, 11.3% had a female householder with no husband present, and 33.3% were non-families. 26.4% of all households were made up of individuals, and 11.3% had someone living alone who was 65 years of age or older. The average household size was 2.48 and the average family size was 3.00.

In the village, the population was spread out, with 28.4% under the age of 18, 10.6% from 18 to 24, 30.0% from 25 to 44, 19.8% from 45 to 64, and 11.2% who were 65 years of age or older. The median age was 31 years. For every 100 females there were 93.6 males. For every 100 females age 18 and over, there were 88.0 males.

The median income for a household in the village was $32,115, and the median income for a family was $39,196. Males had a median income of $29,950 versus $23,077 for females. The per capita income for the village was $15,265. 9.7% of the population and 7.2% of families were below the poverty line. Out of the total population, 12.9% of those under the age of 18 and 9.7% of those 65 and older were living below the poverty line.

== Arts and culture ==
Located on Main Street is the Fayette Opera House. It was built in 1889 at a cost of $4,000. It was used for several purposes in the past, such as touring theater groups. Today, the Opera House hosts a variety of events, including school plays, small concerts, speaking events, and the annual Reed Organ Festival.

In addition, three miles southwest of Fayette is Harrison Lake State Park, created in 1941 when a dam was built over Mill Creek.

=== Events ===
The annual Bullthistle Festival takes place in Fayette on the first Saturday of August. The event consists of a parade, activities, food, entertainment, and the annual S.A.K. basketball tournament at the community park. An evening fireworks display at Fayette school ends the festival every year.

The annual Fall Festival also takes place in Fayette, along historic Main Street. The annual festival also consists of activities, entertainment, and food, as well as craft vendors from around the area. The Fall Festival takes place on the last Saturday of September.

== Education ==
Fayette Local School District administers two schools in the village, Fayette Elementary School and Fayette High School. The Normal Memorial Library is the village's lending library.
