= General Brown =

General Brown may refer to:

== United Kingdom ==
- Chris Brown (British Army officer) (fl. 1970s–2010s), British Army lieutenant general
- George Brown (British Army officer) (1790–1865), British Army general
- Howard Clifton Brown (1868–1946), British Army brigadier general
- John Brown (British Army officer) (died 1762), British Army major general
- Peter Brown (soldier) (c. 1775–1853), British Army major general
- William Gustavus Brown (1809–1883), British Army general

== United States ==
=== U.S. Army ===
- Albert E. Brown (1889–1984), U.S. Army major general
- Arthur E. Brown Jr. (born 1929), U.S. Army four-star general
- Bryan D. Brown (born 1948), U.S. Army four-star general
- Charles E. Brown Jr. (1911–1996), U.S. Army major general and Chief of Chaplains
- Charles Elwood Brown (1834–1904), Union Army brevet brigadier general
- Egbert B. Brown (1816–1902), Union Army brigadier general
- Harvey Brown (officer) (1795–1874), U.S. Army brevet major general
- Jacob Brown (general) (1775–1828), U.S. Army major general
- John M. Brown III (fl. 1960s–2000s), U.S. Army lieutenant general
- John S. Brown (general) (fl. 1970s–2000s), U.S. Army brigadier general
- Joseph W. Brown (1793–1880), U.S. Army general
- Lloyd D. Brown (1892–1950), U.S. Army major general
- Lytle Brown (1872–1951), U.S. Army major general
- Preston Brown (general) (1872–1948), U.S. Army major general
- Robert Brooks Brown (born 1959), U.S. Army general

=== U.S. Air Force ===
- Charles Q. Brown Jr. (born 1962), U.S. Air Force four-star general
- Earl Brown (general) (1927–2020), U.S. Air Force lieutenant general
- George Scratchley Brown (1918–1978), U.S. Air Force general
- I. G. Brown (1915–1978), U.S. Air Force major general
- Norma Elaine Brown (1926–2003), U.S. Air Force major general

=== U.S. Marine Corps ===
- Dudley S. Brown (1896–1971), U.S. Marine Corps major general
- Leslie E. Brown (1920–1997), U.S. Marine Corps lieutenant general
- Wilburt S. Brown (1900–1968), U.S. Marine Corps major general

=== Confederate States Army ===
- John C. Brown (1827–1889), Confederate States Army major general

== Others ==
- Charles Henry Brown (1872–1917), New Zealand Military Forces brigadier general
- James Sutherland Brown (1881–1951), Canadian Army brigadier general

== See also ==
- General Browne (disambiguation)
- Attorney General Brown (disambiguation)
