= General Browne =

General Browne may refer to:

- Beverley Woon Browne (1883–1948), Canadian Army major general
- Edward Stevenson Browne (1852–1907), British Army brigadier general
- Gore Browne (c. 1764–1843), British Army general
- James Browne (Indian Army officer) (1839–1896), British Indian Army major general
- Maximilian Ulysses Browne (1705–1757), Holy Roman Empire generals
- Montfort Browne (fl. 1760–1780), British Army brigadier general
- Reginald Spencer Browne (1856–1943), Australian Imperial Force major general
- Sir Richard Browne, 1st Baronet, of London (c. 1602–1669), Parliamentary Army major general in the English Civil War
- Sam Browne (1824–1901), British Indian Army general
- Thomas M. Browne (1829–1891), Indiana Cavalry brevet brigadier general in the American Civil War
- William M. Browne (1823–1883), Confederate States Army temporary brigadier general

== See also ==
- General Brown (disambiguation)
