= Peter Brown (British Army officer) =

British Army general

Major-General Peter Brown
- Born: Peter Brown; Circa 1775; London, England
- Died: 3 January 1853; Gosport, Hampshire, England
- Military career
- Allegiance: United Kingdom
- Branch: British Army
- Service years: 1797–1852
- Rank: Major-General
- Units: 82nd Regiment of Foot; 25th Regiment of Foot; 23rd Regiment of Foot; 14th Regiment of Foot
- Commands: Commandant of Belém; Commandant of Ghent; Commandant of the Royal Military Asylum, Chelsea
- Conflicts: Battle of Copenhagen (1807); Invasion of Martinique (1809); Peninsular War; British Occupation of France 1815
- Awards: Military General Service Medal-Martinique Clasp

Major-General Peter Brown (c. 1775 – 3 January 1853) was a senior British Army officer, who served in the Napoleonic Wars and was instrumental in the development of the education of the children of British servicemen in the Victorian era.

== Family background ==
Peter Brown was born in London in 1775. He married Margaretta Taylor Amyatt in Walcot on 5 October 1815; Brown was recorded as a lieutenant colonel in the 23rd Regiment of Foot at the time of his marriage. The Browns had two daughters born in 1820 and 1822; and a son born in 1831. Peter Brown died in Gosport on 3 January 1853; his wife would also die in the same place on 2 January 1867. His son would serve as a captain in the British Army. and later as Chief Constable of Dorset's police force.

== Military career ==
Peter Brown was commissioned as an ensign into the 82nd Regiment of Foot on the 7 December 1797, he was promoted lieutenant on 18 December 1802. He was promoted to captain on 21 March 1805, having transferred into the 25th Regiment of Foot. He then transferred to the 23rd of Foot and was promoted brevet major on 21 June 1813 and then lieutenant colonel by 18 June 1815. He was then transferred to the 14th Regiment of Foot and placed on half pay as of 6 Aug 1816. He achieved the rank of colonel on 10 January 1837.

Brown spent most of his operational service in action against the French. As a young officer in the 82nd Regiment of Foot he took part in an expedition to the coast of France in 1800 and later in the Mediterranean. He then served with the 23rd Regiment of Foot at the siege and capture of Copenhagen in 1807. He then deployed with the 23rd Regiment of Foot to Canada and later he took part in the siege and capture of Martinique in 1809; he received the Military General Service Medal with the Martinique Clasp. He then deployed in a support role during the Peninsular War from 1810 as commandant of detachments at Belém until the end of hostilities in 1814. He also served on the Staff in the Netherlands, as commandant of Ghent and later on the Staff of the Army of Occupation in France from 1815 to 1818.

== Proponent of progressive schooling ==
During his time as commandant of the British Army's logistics base in Belém, Brown had taken note of the plight of the children of servicemen on campaign and set up a school for these camp followers to bring them closer to the benefits of even a rudimentary education. He clearly thought a lot of his efforts in Portugal as he had the activity recorded alongside his personal campaign history. He had modelled his school in Lisbon on the Royal Military Asylum in Chelsea and its satellite site in Southampton.

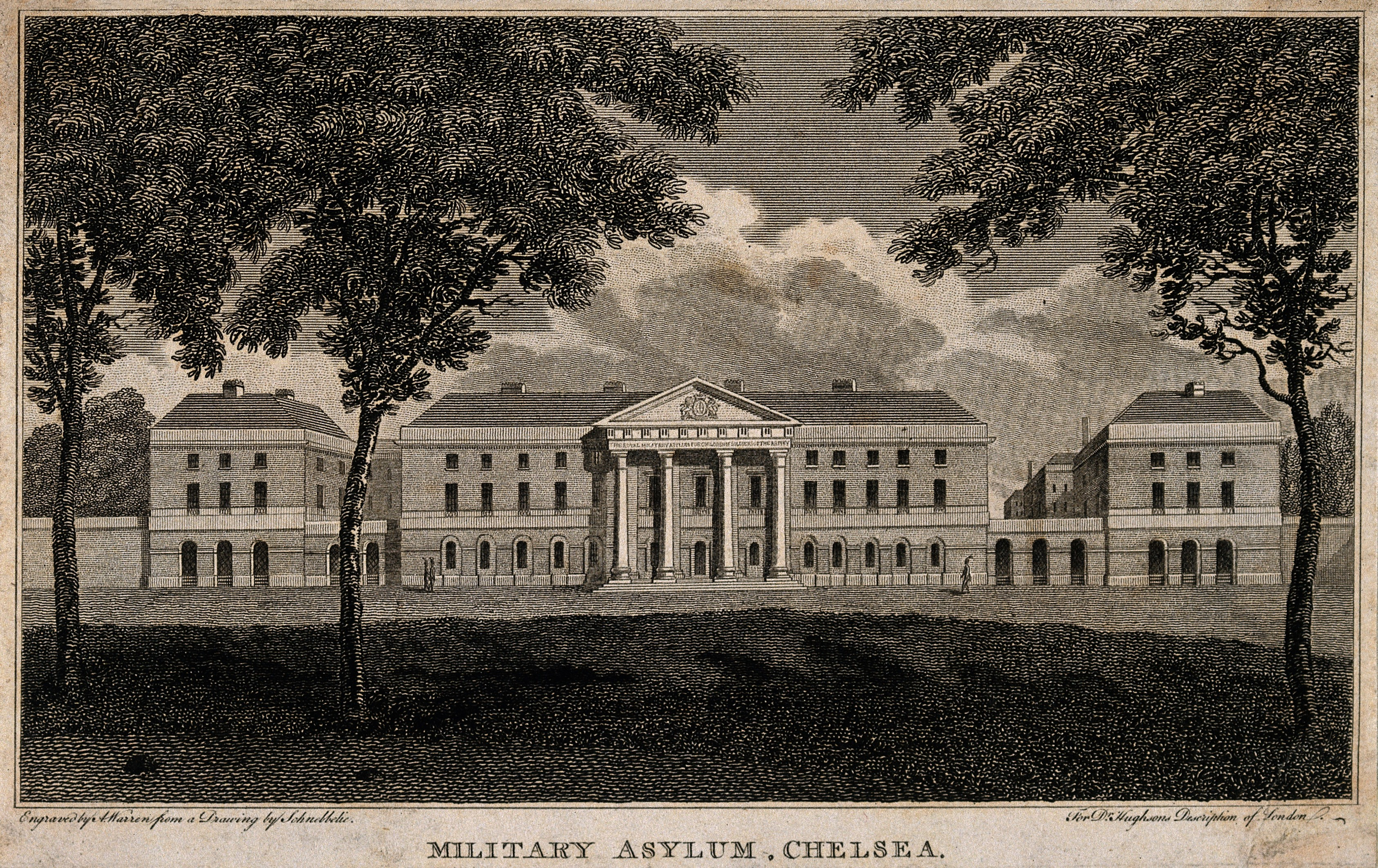
The Royal Military Asylum's Main Elevation

He became commandant of the Royal Military Asylum on 15 December 1843 as a brevet colonel and retired from that post as a major general on 1 April 1852. By the time Colonel Brown took command of the Royal Military Asylum, the institution had already developed as one of the best free education provisions for the sons and daughters of servicemen, based on the Madras School system.

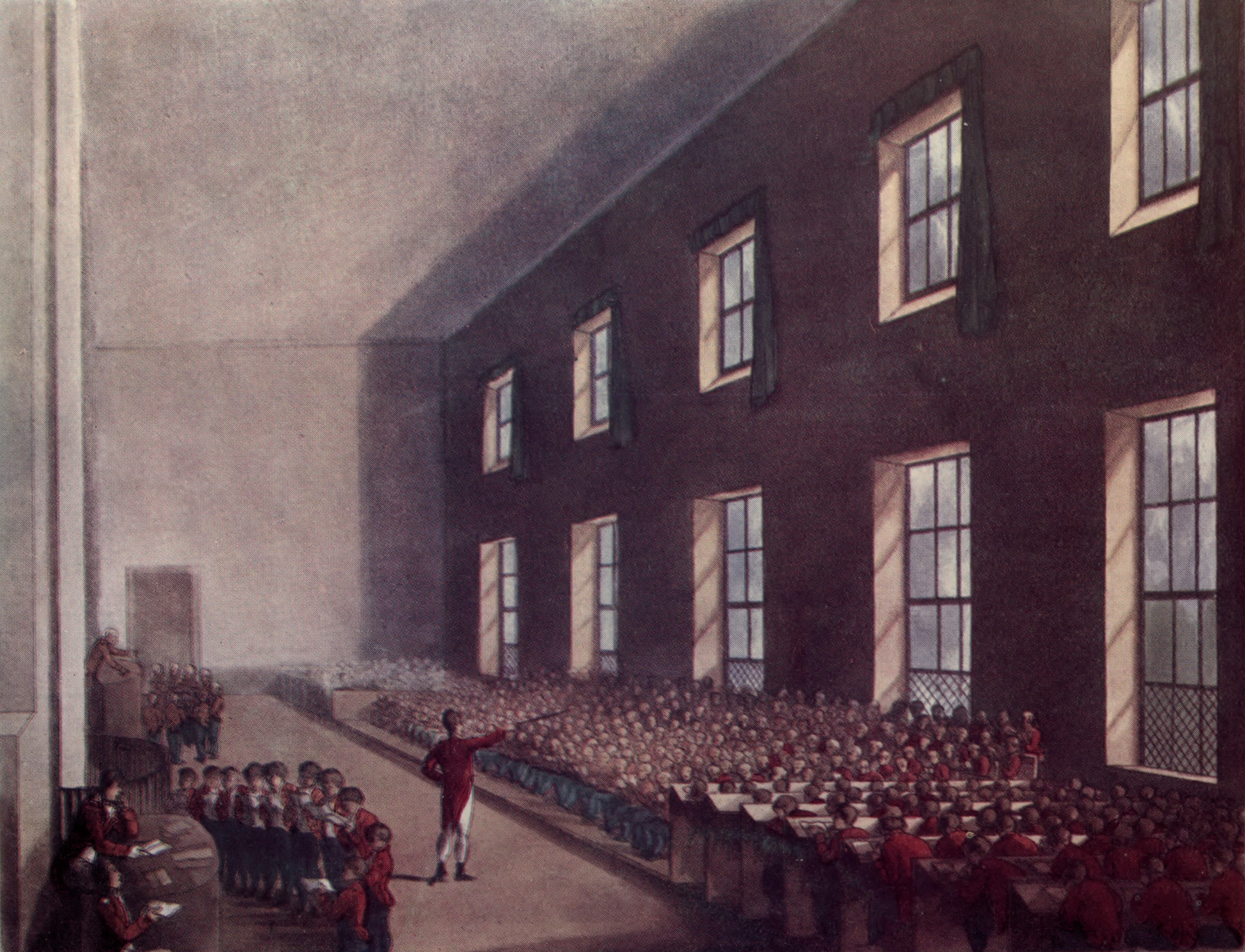
The interior of the Royal Military Asylum

In the case of the Royal Military Asylum children were placed as orphans or as in dire need of stable schooling based on recommendations from the fathers' regiments. During Brown's tenure as commandant the school also became a place of medical study and the institution's staff surgeon became a pioneer in the study of childhood diseases, specifically scarlet fever. Brown also instituted programs that encouraged and rewarded good conduct amongst the school's children and a Good Conduct Medal was introduced during his tenure.

The Royal Military Asylum would be retitled the Duke of York's Royal Military School in 1892; remaining in Chelsea until 1909 when it moved to Dover. The school's buildings are now the Saatchi Art Gallery complex.

== See also ==
- Royal Hibernian Military School
