= Beverley Woon Browne =

Canadian Army general

- Born: 10 September 1883; Haysville, Ontario, Canada
- Died: 17 March 1948 (aged 64) Ottawa, Ontario, Canada
- Allegiance: Canada
- Branch: Canadian Army
- Service years: 1901–1943
- Rank: Major-general (Canada)
- Commands: Adjutant-General (1940–1942); Director-General of the Reserve Army (1942–1943)
- Conflicts: First World War; Second World War
- Awards: CB, DSO, MC, ED

Major-General Beverley Woon Browne, CB DSO MC ED (10 September 1883 – 17 March 1948) was a Canadian Army general who served in both World War I and World War II.

== Life and career ==
Born in Haysville, Ontario, Browne was commissioned into the Canadian Militia in 1901. He served in France during the First World War with the Canadian Expeditionary Force, and received the Distinguished Service Order and the Military Cross, in addition of being mentioned in dispatches three times.

He remained with the Permanent Force after the war, and at the outbreak of the Second World War was appointed Adjutant-General. In 1942 he was appointed Director-General of the Reserve Army, and retired the following year.

In retirement, he was appointed Assistant National Commissioner of the Canadian Red Cross in 1943, serving until his death in Ottawa in 1948. In 1944 he was appointed a Companion of the Order of the Bath.
