= List of state boarding schools in England =

There are about 27 state boarding schools in England, charging boarding fees only and offering free tuition. In addition, the Five Islands Academy in St Mary's, Isles of Scilly, provides free boarding during the week to secondary students from other islands.

== List ==
The gender shown is that of the boarding provision; some of these schools have mixed day provision.

List of schools
| School | LEA | Gender | Coordinates |
|---|---|---|---|
| Beechen Cliff School | Bath and North East Somerset | Boys | 51.3723°N 2.3600°W |
| Brymore Academy | Somerset | Boys | 51.1489°N 3.0795°W |
| Burford School | Oxfordshire | Mixed | 51.8036°N 1.6417°W |
| Colchester Royal Grammar School | Essex | Boys (Note: Mixed in the sixth form.) | 51.8867°N 0.8870°E |
| Cranbrook School | Kent | Mixed | 51.0968°N 0.5382°E |
| Dallam School | Cumbria | Mixed | 54.2287°N 2.7685°W |
| Duke of York's Royal Military School | Kent | Mixed | 51.1442°N 1.3255°E |
| Exeter Mathematics School | Devon | Mixed | 50.7261°N 3.5296°W |
| Gordon's School | Surrey | Mixed | 51.3435°N 0.6465°W |
| Haberdashers' Adams | Shropshire | Boys | 52.7697°N 2.381°W |
| Hockerill Anglo-European College | Hertfordshire | Mixed | 51.8710°N 0.1712°E |
| Holyport College | Windsor and Maidenhead | Mixed | 51.485°N 0.732°W |
| Keswick School | Cumbria | Mixed | 54.6079°N 3.1467°W |
| Lancaster Royal Grammar School | Lancashire | Boys | 54.0386°N 2.6225°W |
| Liverpool College | Liverpool | Mixed | 53.382°N 2.922°W |
| Old Swinford Hospital | Dudley | Mixed | 52.4507°N 2.1442°W |
| Peter Symonds College | Hampshire | Mixed | 51.0701°N 1.3201°W |
| Reading School | Reading | Boys | 51.4483°N 0.9541°W |
| Richard Huish College | Somerset | Mixed | 51.008°N 3.0925°W |
| Ripon Grammar School | North Yorkshire | Mixed | 54.1391°N 1.5395°W |
| Royal Alexandra and Albert School | Surrey | Mixed | 51.2617°N 0.1746°W |
| The Royal Grammar School | Buckinghamshire | Boys | 51.6411°N 0.7388°W |
| The Royal School, Wolverhampton | Wolverhampton | Mixed | 50.8933°N 0.3294°W |
| Sexey's School | Somerset | Mixed | 51.1053°N 2.4632°W |
| St George's School | Hertfordshire | Mixed | 51.8223°N 0.3537°W |
| Steyning Grammar School | West Sussex | Mixed | 50.8933°N 0.3294°W |
| Thomas Adams School | Shropshire | Mixed | 52.8588°N 2.7302°W |
| Wymondham College | Norfolk | Mixed | 52.5449°N 1.0574°E |

== See also ==
- State-funded schools (England)
- Education in England
