= Burford School =

Location
- Cheltenham Road; Burford, Oxfordshire, OX18 4PL; England

Information
- Former name: Burford School
- Type: Comprehensive; Academy
- Established: 1571; 455 years ago
- Founder: Simon Wysdom
- Local authority: Oxfordshire
- Department for Education URN: 138289 Tables
- Chair of Governors: Matthew Willis
- Headteacher: Matthew Albrighton
- Years offered: 7-13
- Years taught: 7-13
- Gender: Coeducational
- Age range: 11-18
- Enrolment: ~1500
- Hours in school day: 08:30-15:00
- Campus size: 40 acres
- Houses: Falkland; Heylin; Warwick; Wysdom
- Colors: Navy and white
- Slogan: The Best of Education
- Sports: Rugby union, hockey, football, netball, cricket, golf and tennis
- Publication: The Burfordian
- Alumni name: Old Burfordians
- Website: burford.oxon.sch.uk

Burford School is a co-educational comprehensive academy day and state boarding school located in Burford, Oxfordshire, England. It is one of 27 state boarding schools in England. The school's headteacher is Matthew Albrighton.

== History ==
The school was founded by the Burford Corporation as a grammar school in 1571 and moved to its current premises on Cheltenham Road in 1957. The original building on Lawrence Lane is now used as a boarding house.

In 2012, Burford School was granted Academy Status and in 2015 the school was placed in the top 90 Secondary Schools in England.

While most students join from the surrounding towns and villages, the school accepts students from across the United Kingdom and abroad into its boarding community. The boarding house is situated at the end of Lawrence Lane in the centre of Burford.

== School houses ==
- Falkland House - Yellow: Named after the Earl of Falkland who lived in Great Tew. He was a benefactor of Burford School and gave his name to Falkland Hall located in the town.
- Heylin House - Blue: Named after an early student and scholar of Burford School. He lived, for a time, in Minster Lovell and is buried in Westminster Abbey.
- Warwick House - Red: Named after the Earl of Warwick who was a key benefactor of the school. He contributed money towards the building of alms houses and Warwick Hall located within the town.
- Wysdom House - Green: Named after Simon Wysdom, a Burford merchant who is credited with being the key founder of Burford School in 1571.
