= Duke of York's Royal Military School =

Selective academy in Kent, England

Coordinates: 51.1438°N 1.3250°E

The Duke of York's Royal Military School
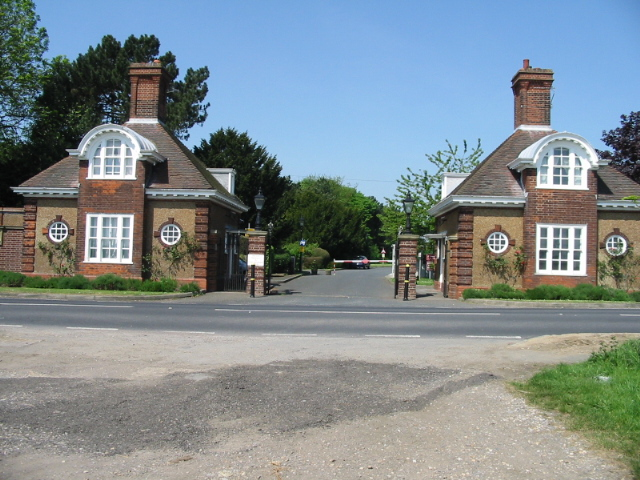
- Guston, Kent, CT15 5EQ; England

Information
- Type: Selective academy state boarding school
- Mottoes: "Looking Forward with Confidence, Looking Back with Pride"; Former: "Sons of the Brave"
- Religious affiliation: Protestant
- Established: 1803; 223 years ago
- Department for Education URN: 136177 Tables
- Ofsted: Reports
- President: Prince Edward Duke of Kent
- Headman: Alex Foreman
- Gender: Co-Ed
- Age: 11 to 18
- Enrolment: 500
- Houses: 11
- Colours: Navy, maroon and white
- Former pupils: Dukies
- Website: http://www.doyrms.com

The Duke of York's Royal Military School, in Guston, Kent, commonly known as the Duke of York's, is a co-educational academy with military tradition for students aged 11 to 18.

In 2010, the school became an academy under the Ministry of Defence and accepts applications from any student wishing to enroll, in a change from the school's tradition of only accepting boys whose fathers had served or were currently serving in the British Army, and who had not joined it as officers. (Girls had been readmitted from 1994.)

This break with tradition transformed the school into a state boarding school and offered it a membership in the State Boarding Forum and Boarding Schools Association. The latter development yet once again changed the school's oversight and transferred it from the Ministry of Defence to the Department for Education.

The curriculum employed by The Duke of York's includes some military traditions, such as the use of uniforms and ceremonial parades, however the School does employ a monitorial style of education modelled on the English public school system.

== History ==
Founded in 1803 by royal warrant in 1801, the school was called the Royal Military Asylum until 1892. The school's primary purpose was to educate the orphans of British servicemen killed in the Napoleonic Wars of 1793–1815. Between 1803 and 1909 the Royal Military Asylum was located at what is now known as the Duke of York's Headquarters in Chelsea, London. The school was co-educational; which makes the Duke of York's the second co-educational boarding school in the United Kingdom. The first co-educational institution was the Royal Hibernian Military School in Dublin which was relocated and merged with Duke of York's after Ireland declared independence. Today, the Chelsea site is home to the Saatchi Gallery.

The school adopted the "Madras system of education" developed by Dr. Andrew Bell, to which Joseph Lancaster made certain improvements.

In 1812, three African youths attended the school as teachers at the invitation of the Duke of Gloucester. They were then sent by the African Institution to Sierra Leone where they were employed as teachers by the Secretary of State for War and the Colonies, the Earl of Liverpool.

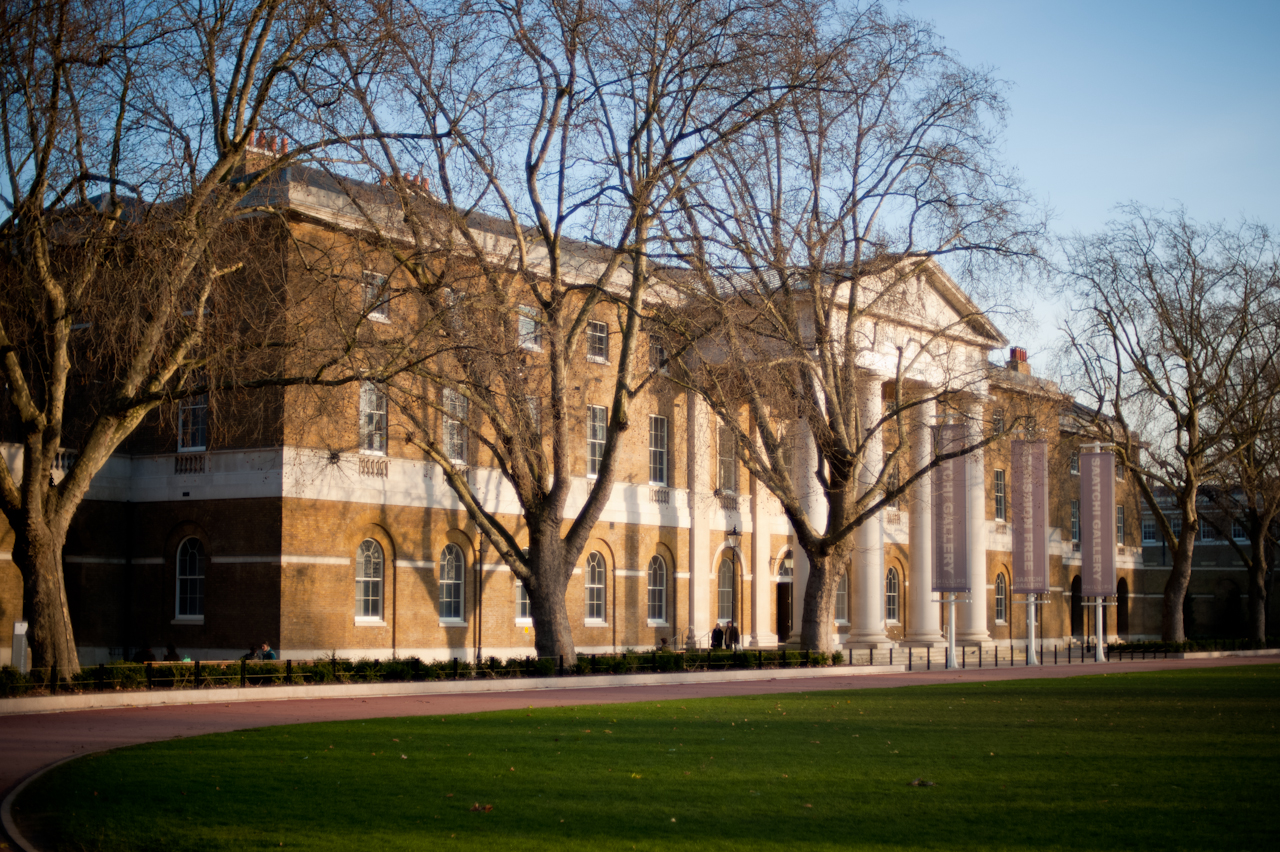
The school's original site in Chelsea.

Between 1816 and 1840, the Asylum had a branch in Southampton which provided schooling for up to 400 military orphans and children serving soldiers of both sexes until 1823, after which the boys were transferred to Chelsea with the girls going to Southampton. A decline in the school numbers resulted in its closure in 1840. Starting in 1841, the building were taken over by the Ordnance Survey.

Major General Peter Brown, a veteran of the Napoleonic Wars, served as Commandant of the Royal Military Asylum. Brown's promotion from colonel to major general occurred while an incumbent Commandant, a development that possibly could be seen as a break given that it was non-active command and it lacked precedence.

Many of the school's pupils performed acts of gallantry in the wars in which the British Army was involved. One such individual was John Shaul, who in the Boer War individuated himself for his bravery and was awarded the Victoria Cross.

It was in 1892 that the Royal Military Asylum was renamed as "The Duke of York's Royal Military School" and ultimately became an all-boys school. In 1909, the school relocated to a new siting on the cliffs above Dover in Kent. For the duration of World War I (1914–1918), the school was evacuated to Hutton, near Brentwood, Essex. This provided the military authorities with a transit point in Dover for troops moved to and from the Western Front. In 1940, the school was evacuated to the Saunton Sands Hotel, Braunton, North Devon. It finally returned to Dover by 1946.

In 1994, the school re-admitted girls and returned to co-education.

The school's first civilian students were accepted in 2010 after the school was granted academy status.

== Academic ratings ==
Between 2007 and 2009, more than 90% of the pupils gained 5 or more GCSEs at grades A*-C (including English and Mathematics). More than 13% of grades were A*/A during the same period.

During this period (2007–2009), 19% of grades gained were A/B at AS level and 12% of grades were A/B at A2 level. A total of 32% of grades gained were passed at A2 level.

== Exchanges with NATO member military schools ==
The Duke of York's runs student exchange programmes with military schools within the umbrella of NATO.The exchange programme with the Lycée Militaire, in Aix-en-Provence, its French equivalent is a case in point. The Duke of York's has also connections with some USA military academies, e.g. the Missouri Military Academy, or the Valley Forge Military Academy and College in Wayne, Pennsylvania, but also with further afar as the Faujdarhat Cadet College, in Chittagong, Bangladesh.

== Boarding houses ==
The school is currently divided into twelve Houses, nine of which are named after famous British generals, one after a famous admiral of the Royal Navy, and another after a famous marshal of the Royal Air Force:

=== Junior houses- Year 7 (Until 2024) ===
- Nelson (Former)
- Trenchard (Former)

=== Senior houses (years 8-11) ===
- Haig
- Kitchener
- Roberts
- Wolseley
- Wellington
- Clive
- Wolfe
- Marlborough
- Alanbrooke

=== Years 12-13 ===
- Centenary House (opened in September 2010)

== Notable alumni ==
- Colonel W.A.T. Bowly, President of the DYRMS Old Boy's Association 1937–1945, as well as being Headmaster of the DYRMS during World War II, recipient of the Royal Victorian Order, the Order of the British Empire and decorated for gallantry in combat during World War I.
- David Mark Cullen was a senior British Army officer. He served as the Assistant Chief of the General Staff from 2013 to 2015.
- Professor Mark Radford, the Deputy Chief Nursing Officer of England and National Director of Education and Training of the NHS. He is also a professor of nursing at Birmingham City University where he was Alumni of the year in 2022 He was awarded a CBE in the 2022 New Years honours list for services to Nursing and the NHS COVID response.
- Bill Ind, British Anglican clergyman and formerly Bishop of Truro.
- Sir James Stuart Jones, British Anglican clergyman and former Bishop of Liverpool.
- Henry Lazarus, clarinet virtuoso of the nineteenth century and professor of the Royal Academy of Music
- Sir Archibald Nye, Vice-Chief of the Imperial General Staff as well as being involved in Operation Mincemeat, Governor of Madras in 1946, UK High Commissioner in Delhi from 1948 to 1952, High Commissioner to Canada from 1952 to 1956, chairman of the Nye Committee.
- Alfred James Phasey, a star musician during the Victorian age, including playing with the Philharmonic Society of London (progenitor of the Royal Philharmonic Society, professor of the Royal Army College of Music.
- John Shaul, recipient of the Victoria Cross as a Corporal of the Highland Light Infantry at the Battle of Magersfontein, 11 December 1899. Corporal Shaul's bravery and humane conduct were so conspicuous that, not only was he noticed by his own officer, but even those of other regiments remarked upon it. Corporal Shaul was in charge of stretcher bearers and was most conspicuous in dressing the wounds of the injured. He was born in King's Lynn on 11 September 1873. He received his VC from the Duke of York at Pietermaritzburg on 14 August 1901.
- Ramon Tikaram, stage and screen actor who was in BBC2 drama This Life.

== Notable masters ==
- Colonel W.A.T. Bowly, CVO, CBE, MC, Headmaster of the DYRMS during World War II, as well as being President of the DYRMS Old Boy's Association 1937–1945, recipient of the Royal Victorian Order, the Order of the British Empire and decorated for gallantry in combat during World War I.
- Major General Lloyd Howell, CBE, Director of Army Education 1976–80, Headmaster [and commandant] 1967–72.
- George Colborne Nugent, Irish Guards, Commandant of the Duke of York's Royal Military School 1913–1914, commanded the 5th London Brigade in World War I and was killed in action on 31 May 1915.
- Lieutenant-Colonel Harold Priestley, CMG, Medical Officer at the Duke of York's Royal Military School 1919–1922, recipient of the Order of St Michael and St George.
- William Siborne, Adjutant of the Royal Military Asylum from 1843 to 1849, having previously demonstrated that the Duke of Wellington's account of his victory at the Battle of Waterloo was erroneous, and was in fact due in considerable part to Prussian assistance.

== Dukies' Corner in Guston Churchyard ==
Some pupils of the school are buried in the churchyard of St Martin of Tours church in the nearby village of Guston.

== See also ==
- The Royal Hospital School
- Queen Victoria School
- Gordon's School
- Association of Harrogate Apprentices
