= St. Mary's Hospital (Phoenix Park) =

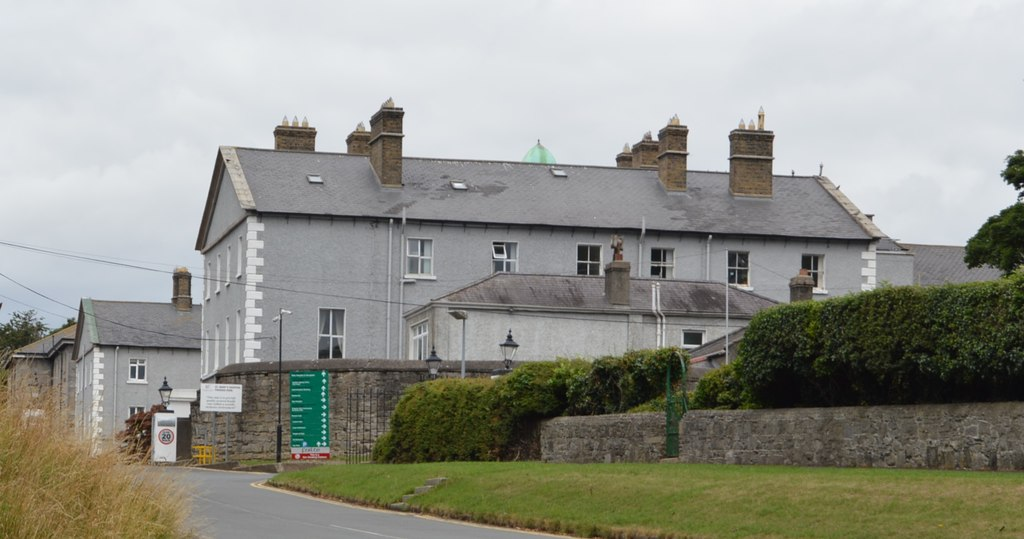

Geography
- Location: Phoenix, Dublin, Ireland
- Coordinates: 53.349994°N 6.336189°W

Services
- Beds: 198

History
- Opened: 1948

Links
- Lists: Hospitals in the Republic of Ireland

St Mary's Hospital is located in the Phoenix Park, Dublin, Ireland. It provides stroke rehabilitation to patients of all ages, inpatient rehabilitation to older people, and residential care to older people. It is a multidisciplinary community hospital. It also provides outpatient services via the day hospital.

== History ==
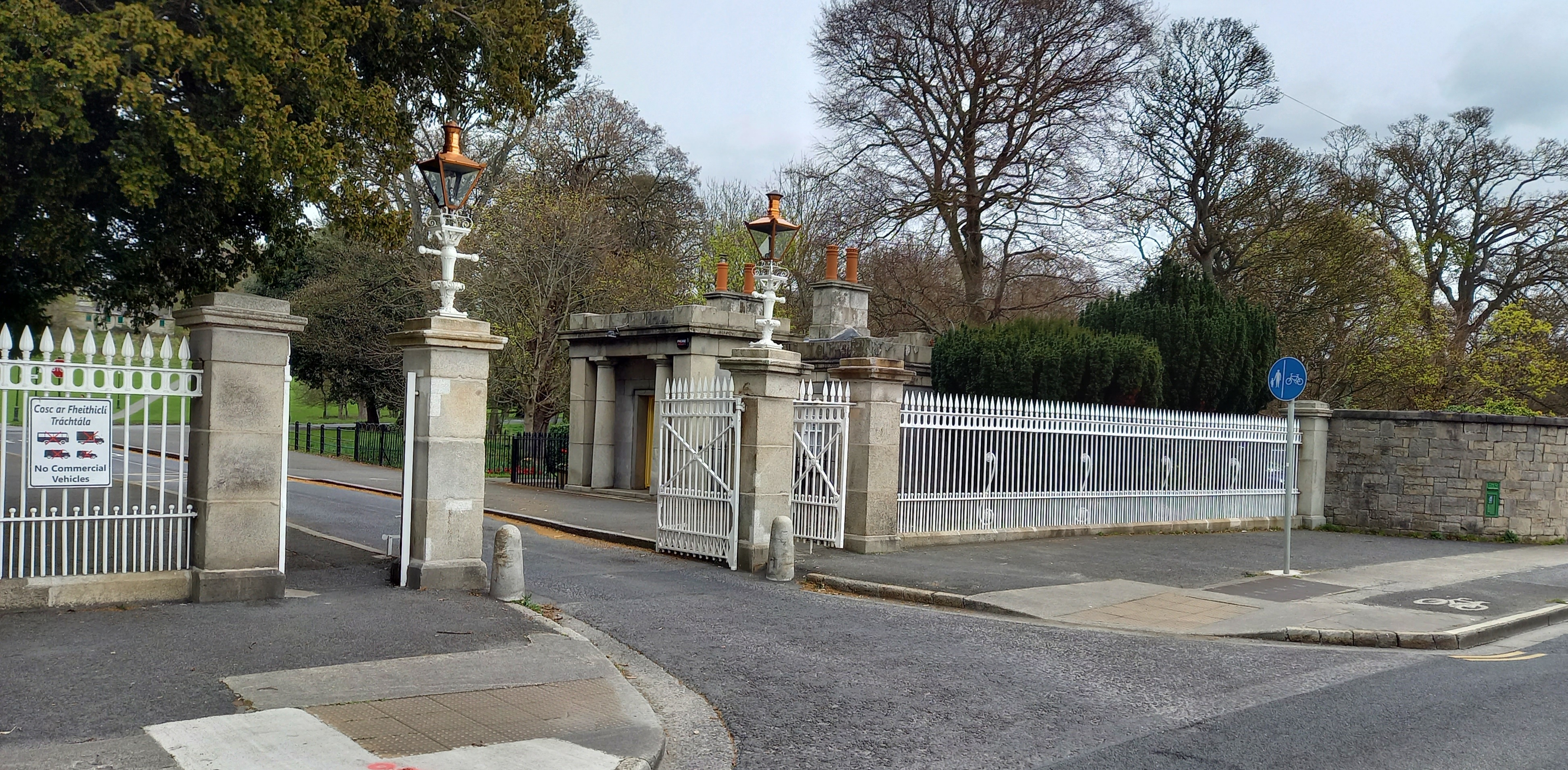
Entrance to the Phoenix Park at St Mary's Hospital gate

=== Royal Hibernian Military School ===
The Royal Hibernian Military School was founded in 1769 as the Hibernian Asylum by the Hibernian Society, a philanthropic organisation founded in Ireland in 1769 after the Seven Years' War. The society petitioned the king on 18 April 1769, and was incorporated under Royal Charter on 15 July 1769. The first meeting of the Governors was held on 6 November 1769 in Dublin Castle.

In 1922 the school and boys moved to Shorncliffe and the buildings were handed over to the newly independent Irish Government.

=== Medical use ===
The buildings were used as a hospital by the Irish Army. In 1948 it was transferred to the Dublin Health Authority and turned into a Chest Hospital. In 1964 it became a facility for older patients and now provides accommodation for dependent older people.

St Mary's Hospital undertook a major renovation in late 2020, bringing facilities to that of a modern healthcare facility. It has increased its inpatient capacity from 48 to 101 sub-acute rehabilitation beds providing support to acute hospitals in the region. Phase 2 of the infrastructure upgrade is to include the expansion and modernisation of the hospital's x-Ray department. The Phoenix Park Community Nursing Unit (PPCNU) has 150 beds and provides residential care to older adults.

=== COVID-19 pandemic ===
During the 2020 COVID-19 pandemic, patients contracted COVID-19. On 11 April 2020 it was announced by HSE that 11 patients had died in the hospital since 2 April 2020. Ten patients were confirmed as testing positive for COVID-19 and the eleventh was a suspected COVID-19 case that was awaiting confirmation. On 25 April 2020 HSE confirmed that 21 patients had died at the hospital since the start of April. Eleven residents had died between 2 April and 17 April and a further ten had died between 17 April and 25 April. All who died tested positive for COVID-19.
