= John Shaul =

Recipient of the Victoria Cross (1873–1953)

John Francis David Shaul VC
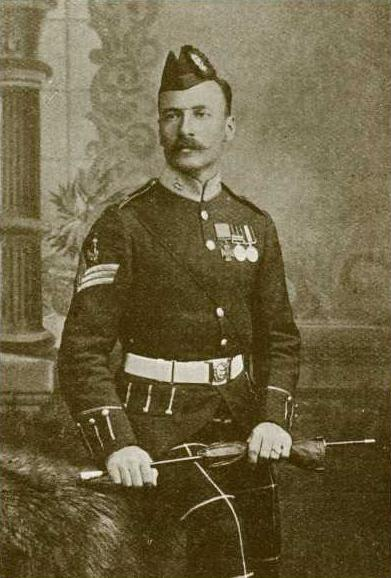
- Shaul c. 1900
- Born: 11 September 1873; King's Lynn, Norfolk
- Died: 14 September 1953 (aged 80); Boksburg, South Africa
- Burial place: Old Cemetery Boksburg
- Military career
- Allegiance: United Kingdom; Union of South Africa
- Branch: British Army; South African Army
- Service years: 1888 - 1909 (UK); 1915 - 1916 (South Africa)
- Rank: Corporal
- Units: Highland Light Infantry; Imperial Light Horse; 5th South African Infantry
- Conflicts: 1898 Occupation of Crete; Second Boer War; World War I
- Awards: Victoria Cross

John Francis David Shaul VC (11 September 1873 – 14 September 1953) was an English recipient of the Victoria Cross, the highest and most prestigious award for gallantry in the face of the enemy that can be awarded to British and Commonwealth forces.

== Details ==
Shaul was 26 years old, and a corporal in the Band of the 1st Battalion, Highland Light Infantry, British Army during the Second Boer War when the following deed took place at the Battle of Magersfontein for which he was awarded the VC.

On the 11th December, 1899, during the Battle of Magersfontein, Corporal Shaul was observed (not only by the Officers of his own Battalion but by several Officers of other regiments) to perform several specific acts of bravery. Corporal Shaul was in charge of stretcherbearers; but at one period of the battle he was seen encouraging men to advance across the open. He was most conspicuous during the day in dressing men's wounds, and in one case he came, under a heavy fire, to a man who was lying wounded in the back, and, with the utmost; coolness and deliberation, sat down beside the wounded man and proceeded to dress his wound. Having done this, he got up and went quietly to another part of the field. This act of gallantry was performed under a continuous and heavy fire as coolly and quietly as if there had been no enemy near.

== Further information ==
He later achieved the rank of Sergeant Bugler (a Bandsman in charge of the Bugle Platoon) in the British Army and served in the South African Army in World War I as a Bandmaster. John Shaul is the only former pupil from the Duke of York's Royal Military School to have been awarded the Victoria Cross. The medal is in the Lord Ashcroft VC Collection.

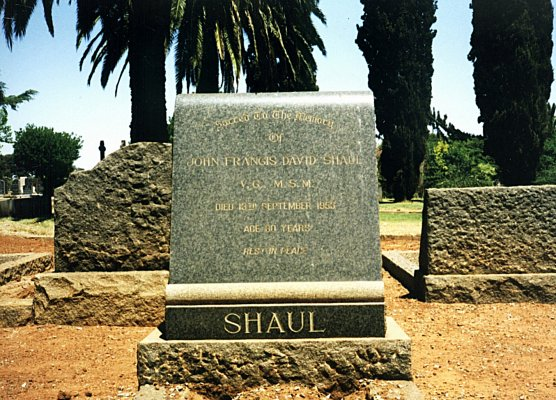
Shaul's grave
