= Attorney General Brown =

Attorney General Brown may refer to:

- Cecil Brown (Hawaii politician) (1850–1917), Attorney General of the Kingdom of Hawaii
- Francis Shunk Brown (1858–1940), Attorney General of Pennsylvania
- George M. Brown (judge) (1864–1934), Attorney General of Oregon
- James Drysdale Brown (1850–1922), Attorney-General of Victoria
- James M. Brown (attorney) (born 1941), Attorney General of Oregon
- James S. Brown (1824–1878), Attorney General of Wisconsin
- Jerry Brown (born 1938), Attorney General of California
- Norris Brown (1863–1960), Attorney General of Nebraska
- Pat Brown (1905–1996), Attorney General of California
- Paul W. Brown (1915–2000), Attorney General of Ohio
- Roland Brown (fl. 1960s), Attorney General of Tanzania
- Rufus E. Brown (1854–1920), Attorney General of Vermont
- Thomas Watters Brown (1879–1944), Attorney-General for Ireland
- Vincent Brown (lawyer) (1855–1904), Attorney-General of Trinidad and Tobago
- William J. Brown (Ohio politician) (1940–1999), Attorney General of Ohio

== See also ==
- Lois Browne-Evans (1927–2007), Attorney-General of Bermuda
- General Brown (disambiguation)
