= Joseph W. Brown =

United States general, businessman, and politician

Joseph Brown
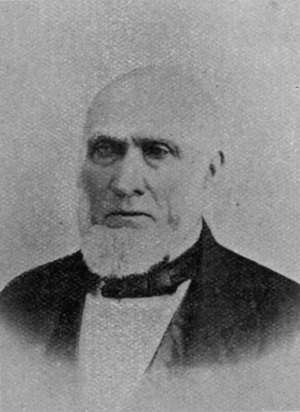

Personal details
- Born: November 26, 1793 Bucks County, Pennsylvania, U.S.
- Died: December 9, 1880 (aged 87) Tecumseh, Michigan, U.S.
- Relatives: Jacob Brown (brother)

Joseph W. Brown (November 26, 1793 – December 9, 1880) was an American businessman, soldier, and politician.

== Biography ==
=== Early life and business endeavors ===
Brown was born in Bucks County, Pennsylvania, on November 26, 1793, and moved to Michigan in 1824.

Brown was the brother of major general Jacob Brown, the founder of Brownville, New York. General Brown (and wife Cornelia), along with his brother-in-law Musgrove Evans (and wife Abi), their cousin Austin Wing and a dozen or so pioneers founded the town of Tecumseh, Michigan in 1824.

From Tecumseh, General Brown ran a stage coach line which operated under the Western Stage Company and ran from Detroit through Ypsilanti, Saline, Tecumseh, Jonesville, White Pigeon, Niles, and Michigan City ending in Chicago – a total trip of just 4½ days (which frequently took six).

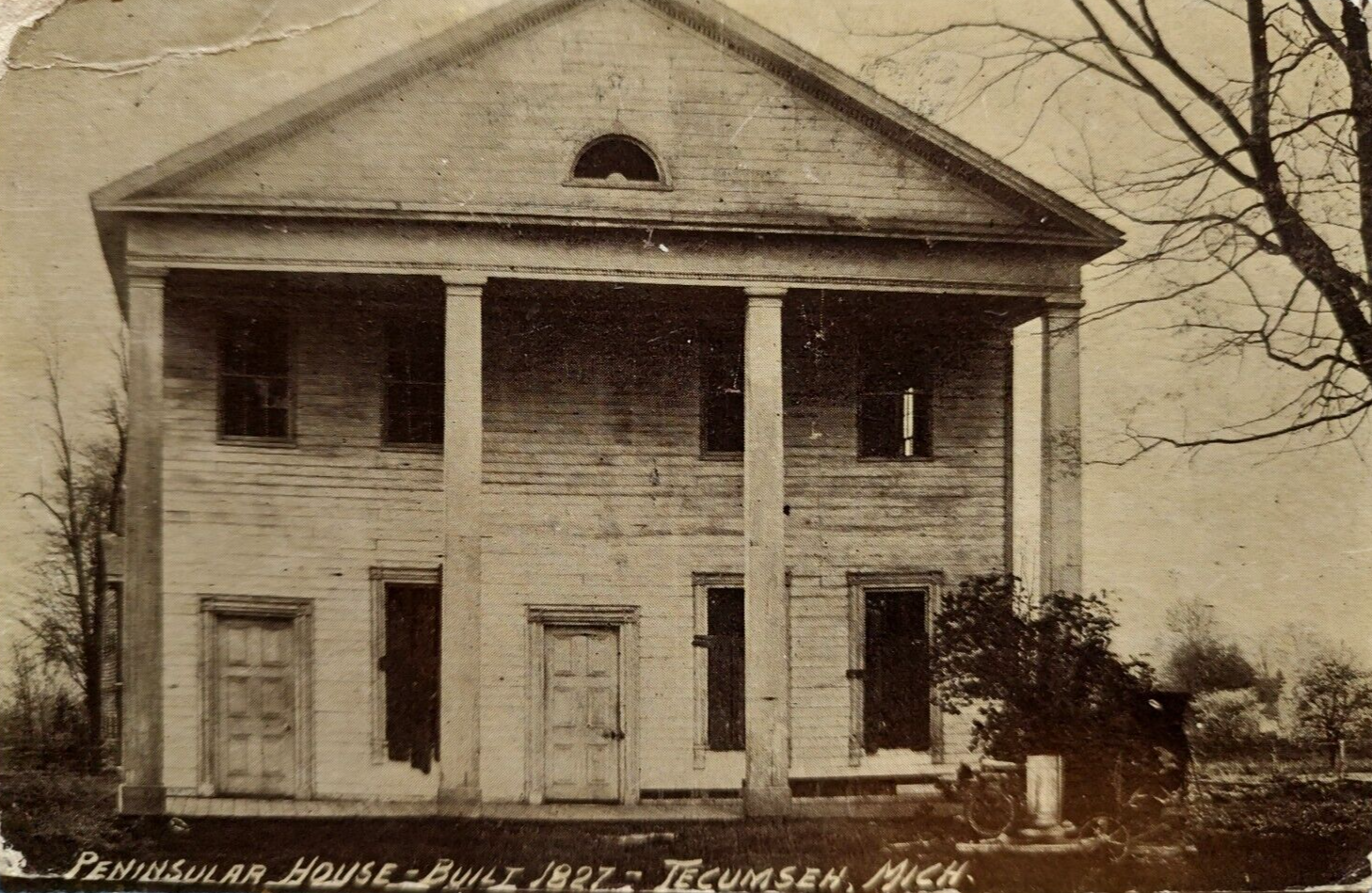
1909 postcard of Peninsular House

The route of Brown's stage line between Saline and Jonesville – stopping in Tecumseh – was anything but the most direct. However, it required that the passengers have an overnight stay in Tecumseh where Brown also owned and operated a large Inn called the Peninsular House.

=== Toledo War ===
General Brown was involved in the Toledo War, having been appointed to protect the disputed area between Ohio and Michigan by then Michigan Governor Stevens T. Mason. In the spring of 1835 the tensions between Ohio and Michigan escalated when it was reported to that a survey party had encroached on Michigan territory and was camped south of Adrian at Phillips Corners. On April 26, 1835, Deputy Sheriff, Colonel William McNair of Tecumseh led a party to intercept the survey group from Ohio. General Brown went along with the essentially civilian group as “special agent of the Territory to watch the Ohio situation” his official title per gubernatorial appointment.

Shots were fired but it was never clear if they were directed at the Ohio group or if they were for effect to flush them out of the cabins in which they were spending their Sabbath. Some Ohio "invaders" escaped while about a dozen were captured. These were escorted back to Adrian where all but one were released. Engineer, Colonel Fletcher, was retained to “test the validity of the arrest.” Colonel Fletcher spent some months in custody in Tecumseh. Benjamin Baxter's account of the events, found in Clara Waldron's One Hundred Years, a Country Town, states that Fletcher was:

a genial gentleman not suffering apparently from his term of incarceration, but sometimes subjecting us to the inconvenience of hunting him up when we had occasion to use the jail for some counterfeiter or horse thief, as he was likely to be found out riding with one of the sheriff's lovely daughters, having taken the jail keys with him.

Later in 1835 General Brown would lead a large group of soldiers to Toledo to protect the rights of the Territory of Michigan. In his memoirs, also quoted in Clara Waldron's book, Dr. M. A. Patterson says of Brown:

As a commander of the Michigan forces in the Black Hawk War, he had acquitted himself to the entire satisfaction of the territorial and national authorities. As commander of the Toledo expedition, he performed his duties equally well and secured all that was desired of the expedition, which was to prevent the Executive of Ohio from trampling upon the rights of the people of Michigan.

It is suggested that General Brown's "moderation and good sense helped prevent possible bloodshed."

=== Later life and death ===
Brown served as the first judge in Lenawee County in 1826, and on July 1, 1839, he was appointed to replace Seba Murphy on the Board of Regents of the University of Michigan, though he attended only one meeting before resigning the office himself.

He died in Tecumseh on December 9, 1880.
