= Royal Hibernian Military School =

1769–1924 school in Dublin, Ireland

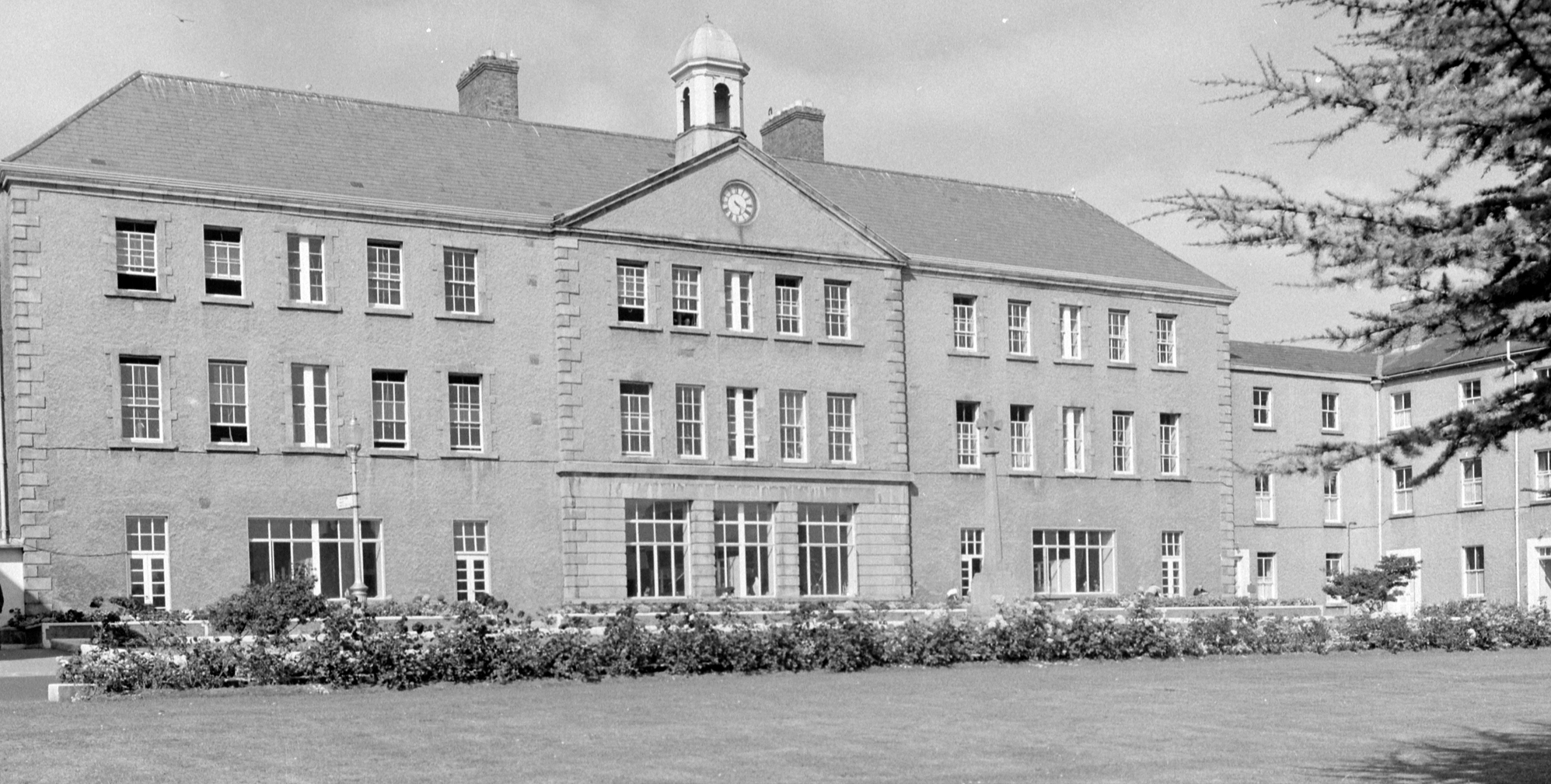
Mid 20th-century view of the school building in the Phoenix Park

The Royal Hibernian Military School was founded in the Phoenix Park, Dublin, Ireland, in 1769, to educate orphaned children of members of the British armed forces in Ireland.

In 1922 the Royal Hibernian Military School moved to Shorncliffe, in Folkestone, Kent, and in 1924 it was merged with the Duke of York's Royal Military School which, by then, was in its current location atop 'Lone Tree Hill' above Dover Castle.

== History ==
The foundation of the School came about in 1769 when King George III granted a Charter of Incorporation on 15 July, the School Governors holding their inaugural meeting on 6 November in Dublin Castle. The school did not open until 6 March 1770 with school pupil roll of 140 children, including 50 girls.

The buildings housing the school were erected in 1771 in the Phoenix Park, overlooking the village of Chapelizod in the Liffey valley (in full view of the Wicklow mountains). The chapel was designed by Thomas Cooley, while thirty years later Francis Johnston designed the extensions to the buildings. It first took in 90 boys and 50 girls as pupils (in the charge of an Inspector and Inspectress, assisted by the Chaplain and an assistant mistress) in March 1770. The site originally occupied 3 acres (12,000 m^{2}) but by 1922 its boundary walls enclosed thirty three acres.

By 1808 the system and organisation of the school followed closely that of its sister school, the Duke of York's Royal Military School (then at Chelsea, London, England). By 1816, when Thomas Le Fanu (father of Sheridan Le Fanu) took over as chaplain, there were 600 children at the school.

In 1853 the school's first "stand of colours" were presented by the then Prince of Wales and, in the same year, the girls at the school left to join their own separate establishment, the Drummond School, which was founded for them at Chapelizod. Even before this, in the eighteenth century, there had been more boys than girls at the school.

The school was intended to act as a feeder to the British Army, where in the mid-19th century, children as young as 12 could enlist in the Army but generally enlistment began at 14. In the eighteenth century, boys were more likely to go into other occupations than into the army. A statement made by Earl Roberts statements in 1909 reported that 80 per cent of RHMS pupils were going straight into the army on leaving the school. By this stage the school was regarded as an excellent source of competent soldiers and non-commissioned officers.

Many of the school's pupils carried acts of gallantry in the wars that the British Army was involved in. One such individual was Frederick Jeremiah Edwards who was awarded the Victoria Cross for extraordinary bravery in the First World War. A war memorial was erected in the school grounds to commemorate this former RHMS pupils who died in World War 1. Although more detailed analysis of service records and press reports has discovered more war dead than is recorded on the memorial.

=== Relocation and merger ===
In 1922 the Royal Hibernian Military School moved to Shorncliffe, in Folkestone, Kent, and in 1924 it was merged with the Duke of York's Royal Military School which by then was in its current location atop 'Lone Tree Hill' above Dover Castle.

A stained glass window depicting a saluting boy soldier is sited above the 'minstrel gallery' type balcony of the Duke of York's School Chapel in Dover, and commemorates the merging of the schools.

== Dublin campus ==
Many of the school's original buildings remain and form a large part of St Mary's Hospital, Phoenix Park. A war memorial to those pupils that were killed in World War 1, the school's graveyard and protestant chapel also remain; the Roman Catholic chapel was demolished as the hospital site was developed.

== Bohemian F.C. ==
Members of the school were instrumental in forming Bohemian F.C. in 1890.

== Commandants ==
- Lieutenant Colonel Hugh Colville 17 January 1809 He died at the school on 14 April 1818
- Lieutenant Colonel Blackwell late 62nd Foot 25 May 1818 - 5 November 1820
- Lieutenant Colonel Spottiswoode June 1824 - 26 November 1832
- Lieutenant Colonel Harris 1832 - 12 July 1834
- Lieutenant Colonel Rowan late Royals 1834 - 17 January 1843
- Lieutenant Colonel Monsel 1843
- Colonel George Thomas Colomb up to 1858 (promoted major general on 26 October 1858)
- Colonel Mylins 1 January 1859 - 1861
- Brevet Lieutenant Colonel Henry Buckley Jenner Wynyard, late 89th Foot 1861 - 1 November 1878
- Lieutenant Colonel Lynch Stapleton Cotton, late 63rd Foot 1 May 1879
- Colonel Francis Charles Hill, late The Essex Regiment 31 May 1882
- Colonel Clifton de Neufville Orr Stockwell 31 May 1889 to 1895
- Colonel Henry Hall, Derbyshire Regiment 11 November 1895 – 31 August 1902
- Lieutenant Colonel Rowley Wynyard, Royal Artillery 1 September 1902 to 1906
- Colonel Richard W Deane 1906–1913
- Lieutenant Colonel Arthur John William Dowell 1913–1914
- Colonel John McDonnell CB 1914–1919
- Colonel Arthur Milton Bent CB CMG CBE, late Royal Munster Fusiliers (last Commandant) 1920–1924.

== Headmasters ==
This list is not exhaustive, as records about this role are sparse; largely because it was focussed on the education of the pupils rather than school management.

- John Henry Gibbons 2 September 1845 - 1891
- Honorary Captain R Bell 1 April 1891
- Honorary Captain Gooding 1899
- John William Cunningham Army School Master circa 1901-1902
- Frederick William Clover Army Schoolmaster 8 November 1906 to 1913
- Arthur John Henry McLeesh Army School Master 24 August 1913 to after June 1915

== Quartermasters & adjutants ==
- Honorary Major Benjamin Smyth MVO 1895 - 1903
- Honorary Lieutenant Denis Hayes 1909
