= Haysville, Ontario =

Haysville
- Unincorporated community
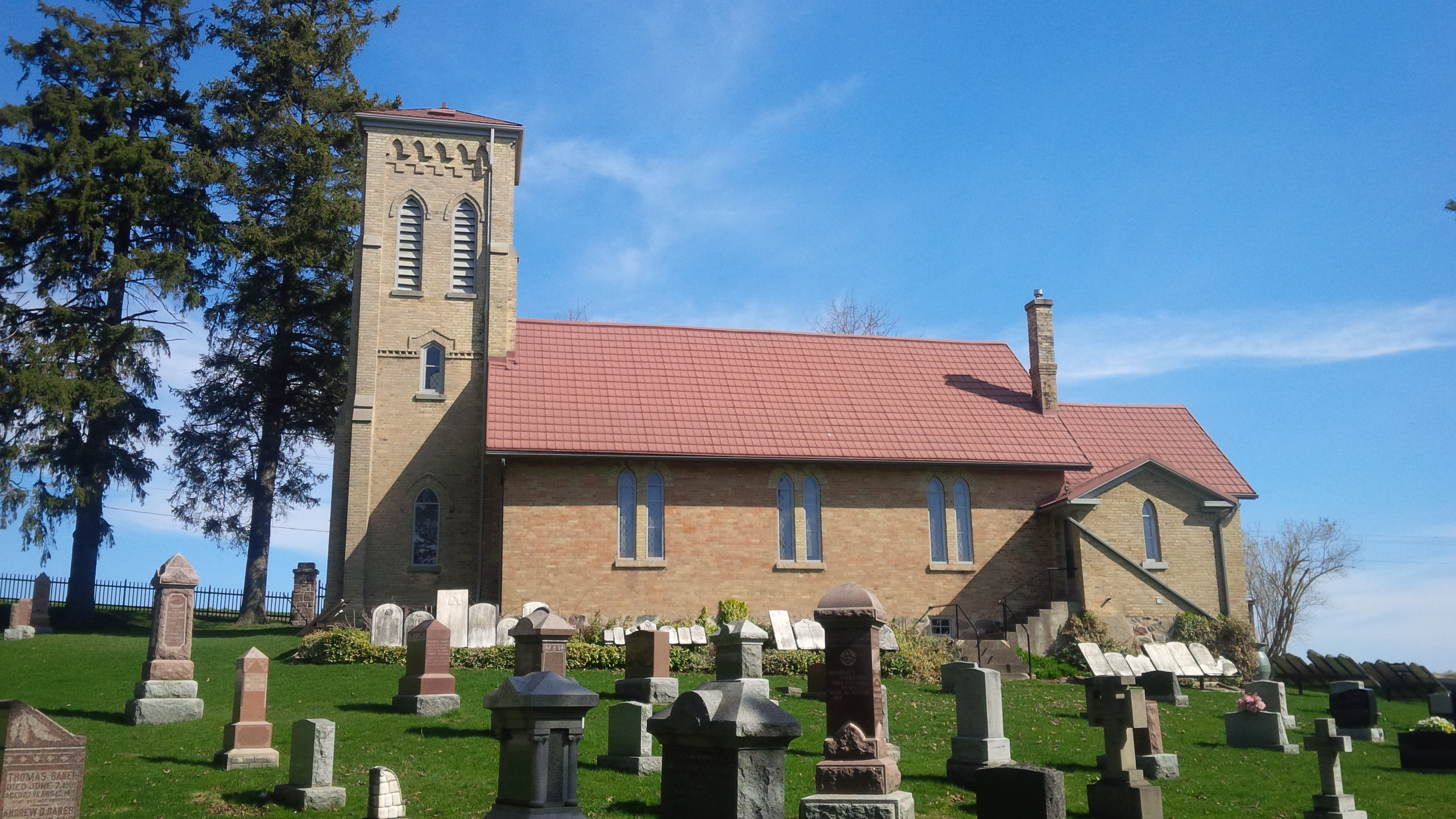
- St. James Anglican Church - Haysville

- Location within Regional Municipality of Waterloo Location within Southern Ontario
- Coordinates: 43°21′21″N 80°39′45″W
- Country: Canada
- Province: Ontario
- Regional municipality: Waterloo
- Township: Wilmot
- Time zone: UTC-5 (EST)
  - Summer (DST): UTC-4 (EDT)
- Forward sortation area: N??
- Area codes: 519 and 226
- NTS Map: 040P07
- GNBC Code: FBMQA

Haysville is a village in Wilmot Township in the Regional Municipality of Waterloo, Ontario, Canada. The Nith River flows through the village. Local students go to Waterloo-Oxford District Secondary School in Baden and Forest Glen Public School in New Hamburg.

It was named after Robert Hays who built a number of mills there and became its first postmaster in 1837. It was known as Jonesborough, Jonestown, and Wilmot before becoming Haysville in 1848.

The first settler in the area was William Hobson, an agent of the Canada Company who was part of a team that went to Goderich in 1829. Hobson preferred the area around what is now Haysville and built a log cabin there. In the 1830s, he built a hotel near the Nith River which became a popular stop on the trail between Guelph and the Huron Tract. Haysville continued to be a busy stage coach stopover until the Grand Trunk Railway arrived in 1856 and bypassed the village and went through New Hamburg instead.

== See also ==
- List of unincorporated communities in Ontario

== Sources ==
- "Once busy village had three names before Haysville," The Record, August 5, 2003, p.B5.
- Historic Place Names of Waterloo County, viewed July 19, 2006. Says the village was named after John Hays.
